= Baron Courtenay =

The Courtenay barony was created in 1299, when Hugh de Courtenay was summoned to Parliament, thus becoming the first Baron Courtenay. He was subsequently made Earl of Devon in 1335. During his life, his son Hugh de Courtenay the younger, was summoned as 2nd Baron Courtenay in 1337, with the barony coming to represent a courtesy title for the heir of the Earls of Devon. This Hugh succeeded as Earl on his father's death in 1340, and since his own son, also Hugh, died in 1348 without having been summoned as baron, it was Earl Hugh's grandson, yet another Hugh, who was summoned as 3rd Baron Courtenay in 1371, during his grandfather's life. He died three years later, and on the Earl's 1377 death, both the Earldom of Devon and the Barony of Courtenay passed to another grandson, Edward de Courtenay, first cousin of the previous courtesy holder of the barony. Though his son Edward would be styled 'Lord Courtenay' during his father's lifetime, he was never summoned under the courtesy title and he predeceased his father, so the earldom and barony devolved on the Earl's younger son, Hugh de Courtenay, 4th/12th Earl of Devon and 5th Baron Courtenay. Both titles then passed together for two generations, but in 1461, Thomas Courtenay, 6th/14th Earl of Devon and 7th Baron, was attainted and executed, and the barony forfeited.

== Barons Courtenay ==
- Hugh de Courtenay, 1st/9th Earl of Devon, 1st Baron Courtenay (1275 or 1276-1340), summoned 1299
- Hugh de Courtenay, 2nd/10th Earl of Devon, 2nd Baron Courtenay (d. 1377), summoned 1337
- Hugh de Courtenay, 3rd Baron Courtenay, (d. 1374), summoned 1371
- Edward de Courtenay, 3rd/11th Earl of Devon, 3rd/11th Earl of Devon, 4th Baron Courtenay (c.1357-1419)
- Edward de Courtenay (ca.1388-1419), styled Lord Courtenay but never summoned
- Hugh de Courtenay, 4th/12th Earl of Devon, 5th Baron Courtenay (1389-1422)
- Thomas de Courtenay, 5th/13th Earl of Devon, 6th Baron Courtenay (1414-1458)
- Thomas Courtenay, 6th/14th Earl of Devon, 7th Baron Courtenay (1432-1461)

== Family tree ==
de Redvers & Courtenay Family Tree, including:
Earls of Devon (Creations of 1141, 1485, 1511 & 1553); Courtenay Barons (1299); Marquess of Exeter (1525); Viscount Courtenay (1762); Courtenay Baronets of Powderham Castle (1644)

Richard de Redvers (d. 1107)
Earl of Devon (1st creation), probably in early 1141
Baldwin de Redvers (c. 1095–1155); Created 1141; 1st Earl of Devon
Richard de Redvers (d. 1162); 2nd Earl of Devon	William de Redvers (aka de Vernon) (d. 1217); 5th Earl of Devon	Renaud de Courtenay (d. 1194)
Baldwin de Redvers (d. 1188); 3rd Earl of Devon	Richard de Redvers (fl. c. 1066 d. 1234); 4th Earl of Devon	Baldwin de Redvers (d. 1216)	Mary de Vernon	Robert de Courtenay (d. 1242)
Baldwin de Redvers (1217–1245); 6th Earl of Devon	John de Courtenay (d. 1274)
Baldwin de Redvers (1236–1262); 7th Earl of Devon	Isabel de Redvers (1237–1293) suo jure 8th Countess of Devon	Hugh Courtenay (1249–1292)
Baron Courtenay, 1299; Earl of Devon (2nd creation or continuation of 1st creation), 1335
Hugh de Courtenay (1276–1340); 1st Baron Courtenay; 1st/9th Earl of Devon
Hugh de Courtenay (1303–1377); 2nd Baron Courtenay; 2nd/10th Earl of Devon
Hugh Courtenay (1327–1348)	Edward Courtenay of Godlington (c. 1331–1368/1371)	William Courtenay (c. 1342–1396); Archbishop of Canterbury	Philip Courtenay (c. 1355–1406)
Hugh Courtenay (c. 1345–1374); 3rd Baron Courtenay	Edward de Courtenay (1357–1419); 4th Baron Courtenay; 3rd/11th Earl of Devon	Hugh Courtenay	John Courtenay (d. before 1415)
Edward de Courtenay (c. 1385–1418); Styled Lord Courtenay	Hugh de Courtenay (1389–1422); 5th Baron Courtenay; 4th/12th Earl of Devon	Hugh Courtenay (d. 1471)	Philip Courtenay (1404–1463)
Thomas de Courtenay (1414–1458); 6th Baron Courtenay; 5th/13th Earl of Devon	Edward Courtenay (d. 1509); Created 1485; 1st Earl of Devon; Forfeit at his death by his son's attainder 1504	William Courtenay (d. 1485)
Thomas Courtenay (1432–1461); 7th Baron Courtenay; 6th/14th Earl of Devon	John Courtenay (1435–1471); Attaider of 1461 reversed Title restored 1470; 7th/15th Earl of Devon; Title in Abeyance 1471–1485; Attainder of 1461 re-invoked 1485, title forfeit	William Courtenay (d. 1511); Attainted 1504; Restored and Created 1511; 1st Earl of Devon	William Courtenay (d. 1512)
Earldom of Devon and Barony of Courtenay forfeit, 1461	Earldom of Devon forfeit, 1485
Marquess of Exeter, 1525
Henry Courtenay (1498–1538); 2nd Earl of Devon; Created 1525; 1st Marquess of Exeter; Attainted 1538; Titles forfeit	William Courtenay (1477–1535)
Marquessate of Exeter and Earldom of Devon forfeit, 1538
Earl of Devon, (2nd creation) 1553
Edward Courtenay (1527–1556); Created 1553; 1st Earl of Devon; Title granted with remainder to heirs male whatsoever Title Dormant until 1831	George Courtenay
William Courtenay (1529–1557) de jure 2nd Earl of Devon
William Courtenay (1543–1630) de jure 3rd Earl of Devon
William Courtenay (d. 1605)	Francis Courtenay de jure 4th Earl of Devon (c. 1576–1638)
William Courtenay (1628–1702); Created 1644; 1st Baronet of Powderham Castle de jure 5th Earl of Devon
Francis Courtenay (1650–1699)
William Courtenay (1675/6-1735); 2nd Baronet of Powderham Castle de jure 6th Earl of Devon
William Courtenay (1709–1762); 3rd Baronet of Powderham Castle; Created 1762; 1st Viscount Courtenay de jure 7th Earl of Devon	Henry Reginald Courtenay (1714–1763)
William Courtenay (1742–1788); 2nd Viscount Courtenay de jure 8th Earl of Devon	William Courtenay (1738–1783)	Henry Reginald Courtenay (1741–1803); Bishop of Exeter
William Courtenay (1768–1835); 3rd Viscount Courtenay; Claim established 1831 to Earldom; 9th Earl of Devon; Viscountcy Extinct	William Courtenay (1777–1859); 10th Earl of Devon
William Reginald Courtenay (1807–1888); 11th Earl of Devon	Henry Hugh Courtenay (1811–1904); 13th Earl of Devon	Thomas Peregrine Courtenay (1782–1841)
Edward Baldwin Courtenay (1836–1891); 12th Earl of Devon	Henry Reginald Courtenay (1850–1897); Styled Lord Courtenay
Charles Pepys Courtenay (1870–1927); 14th Earl of Devon	Henry Hugh Courtenay (1872–1935); 15th Earl of Devon	Frederick Leslie Courtenay (1875–1935); 16th Earl of Devon
Charles Christopher Courtenay (1916–1998); 17th Earl of Devon
Hugh Rupert Courtenay (1942–2015); 18th Earl of Devon
Charles Peregrine Courtenay (b. 1975); 19th Earl of Devon
Jack Haydon Langer Courtenay (b. 2009); Styled Lord Courtenay; Heir Apparent

== Bibliography ==
- Cokayne, G. E. (1913). The Complete Peerage of Great Britain and Ireland. Vol. III (revised ed.). pp. 465–467.
- Cokayne, G. E. (1916). The Complete Peerage of Great Britain and Ireland. Vol. IV (revised ed.). pp. 323–7.
