= Hugh Courtenay =

Hugh Courtenay or Hugh de Courtenay is the name of:

- Hugh de Courtenay (died 1292), English nobleman
- Hugh de Courtenay, 1st/9th Earl of Devon (1276–1340), English nobleman
- Hugh de Courtenay, 2nd/10th Earl of Devon (1303–1377), English nobleman and figure in the Hundred Years' War
- Hugh Courtenay (died 1348) (1327–1348), English knight
- Hugh Courtenay (died 1374), English soldier
- Hugh Courtenay (died 1425) (1358–1425), English member of Parliament and High Sheriff of Devon
- Hugh de Courtenay, 4th/12th Earl of Devon (1389–1422), English nobleman
- Hugh Courtenay (died 1471) (1420s–1471), English member of Parliament for Cornwall
- Hugh Courtenay (MP), Welsh politician who sat in the House of Commons in 1653
- Hugh Courtenay, 18th Earl of Devon (1942–2015), British peer
