= Naish Priory =

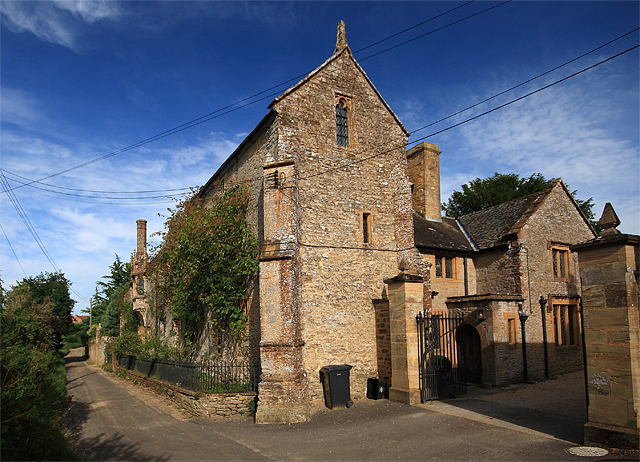

- Location within Somerset
- 50°55′14″N 2°39′44″W
- Location: East Coker, Somerset, England

History
- Built: c. 1400

Listed Building – Grade I
- Official name: Naish Priory, including attached Priory Cottage and north boundary railings
- Designated: 19 April 1961
- Reference no.: 1057189

Naish Priory in East Coker, Somerset, England, contains portions of a substantial house dating from the mid-14th century to around 1400. Emery says the building was not a priory as it had been termed by the late-19th-century owner Troyte Chafyn Grove, and there appears no evidence of ownership by a religious house or the residence of a large community of monks on the site. However, there is evidence of a dormitory and communal living dating from the 14th century, and the extant buildings grew on a foundation that had religious obligations by way of chantry to the de Courtenay Earls of Devon from at least 1344. It has been designated as a Grade I listed building, with the attached Priory Cottage and northern boundary railings.

Naish Priory and surrounding farm land ("Naish") is a medieval period establishment of Romano–British and Saxon origin, sited directly equidistant between two Roman Villas. During Saxon times it formed part of the estate of Gytha Thorkelsdóttir, which passed to her son Harold II of England as part of his royal manor, and it was a significant journey stop on the important route from Winchester, Salisbury and Shaftesbury into Devon and Cornwall.

The extant 14th-century buildings evidence primary links to the important de Courtenay family of the medieval period, Earls of Devon, close blood relatives of the Plantagenet, Lancastrian and Tudor kings, and one of the most important English Renaissance families. They had received rights of the royal Coker Manor via the de Redvers and de Mandeville families who had been given the estates by William II of England after the Norman Conquest that led to their confiscation from Harold Godwinson, King of England and his mother. Hutton claimed that the "venerable" Naish was site of the original Coker Manor House of the de Mandeville family.

Naish's local and national historic significance is only now, after its Grade 1 listing in 1961 to protect it from encroachment by Yeovil's expansion, beginning to be fully assessed. Naish has been restored since the end of the 19th century and is maintained as a Grade I listed unified dwelling.

== Buildings and foundation ==
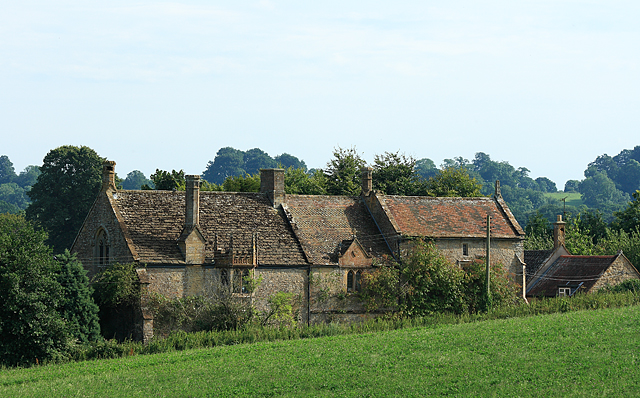
Naish Priory across the fields

The original building work of what stands today at Naish Priory is directly linked to Sir Peter Courtenay (1346–1404), a Knight of the Garter and Royal Household and Constable of Windsor Castle, Lord of East Coker, and his brother William Courtenay (1342–1396) who was Archbishop of Canterbury from 1381 to 1396 and Lord Chancellor of England in 1381 and Sir Peter's tenant at Naish from 1392. Archbishop William de Courtenay was also responsible for major contemporaneous building work at Christ Church, Canterbury, and the foundation at Maidstone College. These De Courtenay brothers were very significant political players on the national stage during the turbulent reigns of Edward III of England and Richard II of England, which resulted in Henry of Lancaster usurping the throne in 1399 to become Henry IV of England. Also significant to completion of the 14th/15th-century work at Naish was their younger de Courtenay brother, Sir Philip Courtenay, Richard II's Lord Lieutenant of Ireland and High Admiral of the Western Seas, who took over from William the Archbishop as Peter's tenant at Naish when William the Archbishop died in 1396.

The building work itself from this period is local ham stone adorned with fan tracery, oriel window, octagonal chimneys, a pointed arch with oak door and heraldic carving, and a chapel with squint and great east window, flanked by stone carved corbelled heads. It is in the gothic perpendicular court style popularised by William Wynford and his colleague Henry Yevele. Until 1405 Wynford was supervising the building the Church of St John the Baptist, Yeovil, which is approximately 2.5 miles (4 km) from Naish Priory. Wynford was also responsible for building Winchester College and New College, Oxford, for William of Wykeham, who was William Courtenay's erstwhile colleague and friend.

The foundation of the establishment now seen at Naish Priory is also earlier linked to Archbishop William and Sir Peter Courtenay's father, Hugh de Courtenay, 2nd Earl of Devon, previous Lord of Coker, who was High Admiral of the West Seas and married to Margaret de Bohun, 2nd Countess of Devon, niece of King Edward II. The de Bohun family was the leading patron of illuminated manuscript work in England in the 14th century. Margaret died in 1391 in her eighties a significant matriarch, having had seventeen children by Hugh de Courtenay.

The earlier endowment by Huw the 2nd Earl of Devon, of Naish and surrounding land in East Coker, as part of a chantry for his family's souls, took place in 1344, and is evidenced by charter. Naish became a site of worship separate to St Michael's church in East Coker and housed several clerics devoted to the chantry of the family. It is probable that it encompassed facilities for the education of talented local children of little means, as provided for in Margaret de Bohun's will.

Corbelled heads and gargoyles from around 1400, such as the rare toad "beast of Botreaux" which signifies the de Bohun family, stand on the outer walls of Naish Priory, evidencing the contemporaneous links between the building and the de Courtenay and de Bohun families, as well as those families' close blood ties and allegiance with Henry IV and the House of Lancaster who replaced the Plantagenet kings in 1399. In particular the corbelled heads which stand either side of the great east window have been identified as those of Henry IV and Joan of Navarre, Queen of England who were married in 1403.

Naish is surrounded by rich Grade I farm land which contains significant trees, waterways, ancient hedgerows, hollows with sunken roads and paths.

== History ==
The original buildings at Naish, together with surrounding Grade 1 farm land to be worked for an income in perpetuity, were dedicated by Hugh de Courtenay, 2nd Earl of Devon in 1344 to the remembrance and prayer for the souls of his family. They were close kinsmen and blood relations of the Plantagenet and Lancastrian kings of England, with great local and national responsibilities during the 14th and 15th centuries. These generations were the most important of the de Courtenay family, and their members occupied many of the most influential court, chivalric, military, religious and political roles in England at crucial times in the development of England during the late medieval period.

Both Huw the 2nd Earl and his son Philip were High Admirals of the West Seas, in charge of commandeering the English Channel fleet west of the Thames, and specifically the defence of the south and west coasts of England from French invasion during the Hundred Years' War. They are the origin of Yeovil's long connection with procurement for the Royal Navy. The farm land at Naish produced hemp yarn sold into the Coker manor consignments for the navy in the 1350s. Unfortunately the area's seafaring connections meant that Coker was among the first Somerset areas to be struck by the Black Death (bubonic plague) which spread west along the south coast with shipping and then inland with those associated. Huw de Courtenay the 2nd Earl of Devon's son and heir, also Huw, a great military champion died of plague in 1349 at Forde Abbey on his way from Coker to Devon.

== De Courtenays at Naish ==
In 1392 after his mother's death William Courtenay, the Archbishop of Canterbury, formally took possession of Naish, in East Coker, from his brother Peter, along with the rest of the Burrell's Mill estate that mainly lay in West Coker and was therefore then formally the domain of his nephew Edward the 3rd Earl.

== Later years ==
The Wars of the Roses in the mid-15th century destroyed the de Courtenay family's unity, as part of the Bonville–Courtenay feud, with cousin turning against cousin and the challenge to their power in Devon from the Bonville family taking its toll. Nevertheless, the foundation at Naish continued in the same form.

It appears that some Tudor alterations of Naish to a more secular country house with chapel took place during that lease. Naish seems to have been occupied during this time by his younger brother James de Courtenay who is responsible for the alteration to a country house, perhaps as the family was rehabilitated under Henry VIII of England.

Works at Naish in the Victorian era added a south western wing, a second storey to the central section, modified the cloister and added a galleried staircase tower to the south of the eastern end to provide the house greater accommodation and amenity. Above the gatehouse an important original Oriel window remains. In 2007, the house was put up for sale at a price of £1.775 million.

== Names ==
Naish Priory has variously in its long history been known as La Aisshe, L'Aisshe, Naysshe, Naysshe Ferme, Nayssh, Nayshe, Nasshe, Naysh, Naysh Manor, Old Mansion Nash, Nash Court, Nash Farm, Nash Abbey, Nash Priory and Naish Priory. Its unique and complex history has led to many different interpretations including what would appear to be the current potential misnomer of Naish Priory.

== See also ==
- Grade I listed buildings in South Somerset

== Bibliography ==
- Aston, Michael (2000). Monasteries in the Landscape (2nd Ed). The History Press Ltd. ISBN 978-0-7524-1491-1.
- Bennett, Michael (1999). Richard II and the Revolution of 1399. Sutton Publishing Ltd. ISBN 978-0-7509-4655-1.
- Collinson, John, A History of Somerset, 1792.
- Coppack, Glyn (2009). Abbeys and Priories. Amberley Publishing. ISBN 978-1-84868-419-5.
- Dahmus, Joseph (1967). William Courtenay: Archbishop of Canterbury, 1381-96. Penn State University Press. ISBN 978-0-271-73121-6.
- Foulkes, Cecil C., 'A Guide to St. Michael's Church, East Coker, Somerset', 1987, revised Mary Field 1997.
- Hindle, Paul (2008). Medieval Roads and Tracks (2nd Ed). Shire Publications Ltd. ISBN 978-0-7478-0390-4.
- Kelly's Directories (2006). Kelly's Directory of Somersetshire 1914. Archive CD Books Ltd. ISBN 978-1-84594-390-5.
- Mortimer, Ian (2008). The Fears of Henry IV: The Life of England's Self-Made King. Vintage. ISBN 978-1-84413-529-5.
- Pevsner, Nikolaus (1958). The Buildings of England South and West Somerset. Penguin Books.
- Ricketts, Annabel (2007). The English Country House Chapel: Building a Protestant Tradition. Spire Books Ltd. ISBN 978-1-904965-05-3.
- Tatton-Brown, Tate W.T.; Crook, John (2007). The Abbeys and Priories of England. New Holland Publishers Ltd. ISBN 978-1-84537-116-6.
