= Bohun swan =

Heraldic badge used in England

The Bohun swan: A swan proper gorged (with or without a crown) and with a golden chain

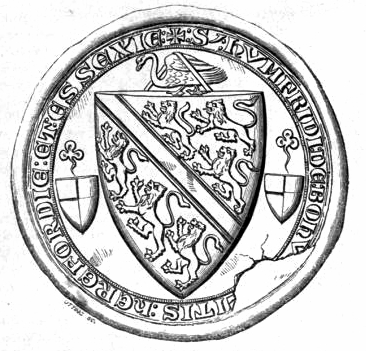
Counter seal of Humphrey de Bohun, 4th Earl of Hereford (1276–1322), attached to the Barons' Letter, 1301, showing the Bohun swan above the escutcheon and supporting the guige strap

The Bohun swan, also known as the Bucks Swan, was a heraldic badge used originally in England by the mediaeval noble family of de Bohun, Earls of Hereford, and Earls of Essex.

== Origin ==
The widespread use of the swan as a badge derives from the legend of the Swan Knight, today most familiar from Richard Wagner's opera Lohengrin. The Crusade cycle, a group of Old French chansons de geste, had associated the legend with the ancestors of Godfrey of Bouillon (d. 1100), King of Jerusalem and the hero of the First Crusade. Godfrey had no legitimate progeny, but his wider family had many descendants among the aristocracy of Europe, many of whom after his death made use of the swan as a heraldic emblem. In England such a family was that of de Bohun, Earls of Hereford and Earls of Essex.

== Usage by de Bohun ==
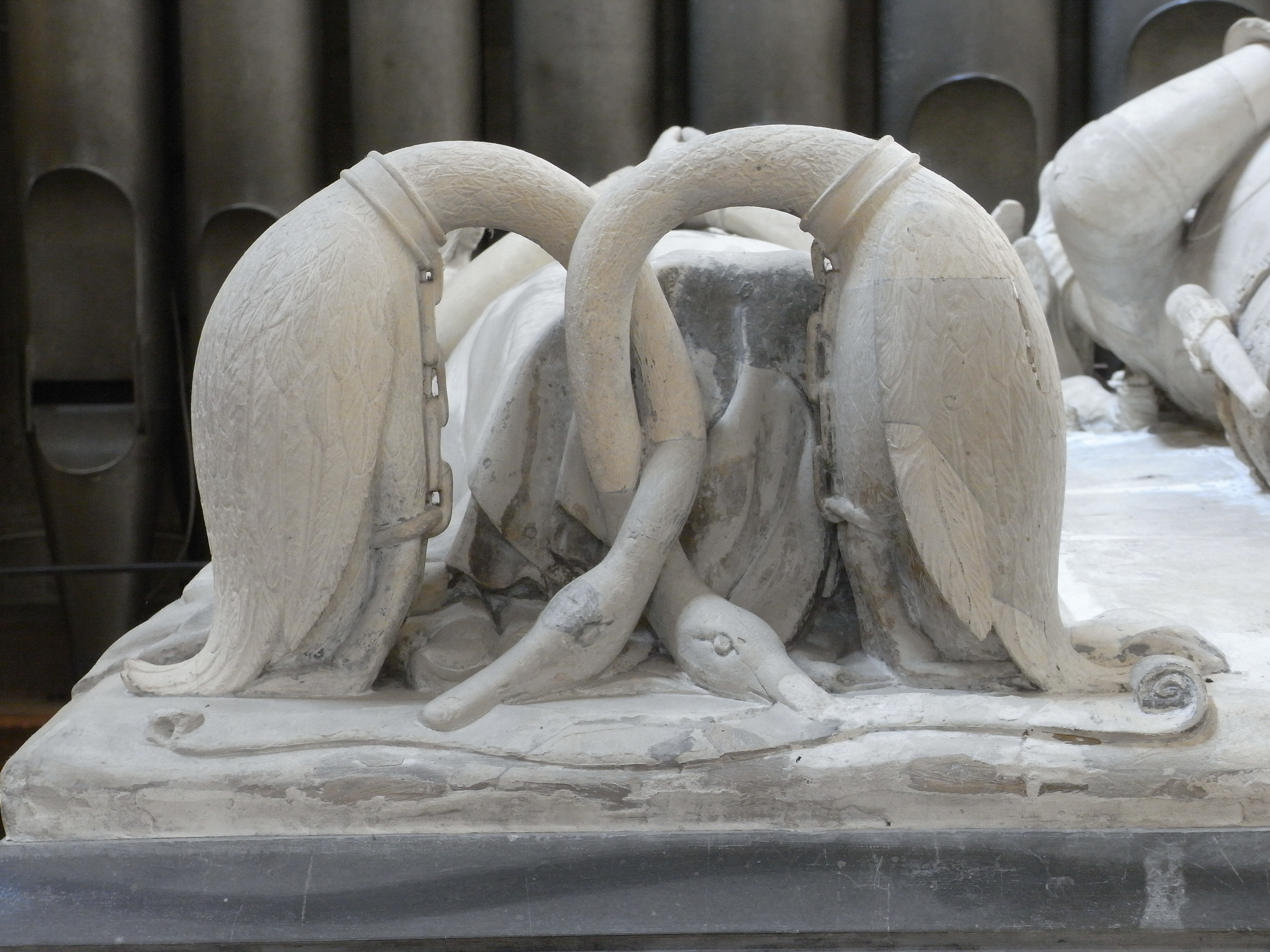
Bohun swans collared and chained with necks entwined at feet of effigy of Margaret de Bohun (1311–1391), daughter of Humphrey de Bohun, 4th Earl of Hereford (1276–1322) and wife of Hugh de Courtenay, 2nd Earl of Devon (1303–1377). On her chest tomb in south transept, Exeter Cathedral, heavily restored 19th century

Surviving examples of usage of the Bohun swan by the de Bohun family include:

- The counter-seal of Humphrey de Bohun, 4th Earl of Hereford (1276–1322), attached to the Barons' Letter, 1301, shows the Bohun Swan above the escutcheon and supporting its guige strap.
- Two Bohun swans collared and chained with necks entwined at the feet of the effigy of Margaret de Bohun (1311–1391), daughter of Humphrey de Bohun, 4th Earl of Hereford (1276–1322) and wife of Hugh de Courtenay, 2nd Earl of Devon (1303–1377), on her tomb chest in the south transept of Exeter Cathedral.

== Extinction of de Bohun senior line ==
Humphrey de Bohun, 7th Earl of Hereford (1341–1373) died without male issue, leaving as his co-heiresses two daughters:

- Eleanor de Bohun (c. 1366–1399), the eldest, who married Thomas of Woodstock, 1st Duke of Gloucester, the fourteenth and youngest child of King Edward III (1327–1377).
- Mary de Bohun (c. 1368–1394), who married King Henry IV.

== Descent ==
Following the extinction of the Senior male line of the de Bohun family the Bohun swan badge was used by descendants of the two heiresses: by the royal House of Lancaster descended from Mary de Bohun and by the Stafford family descended from Eleanor de Bohun and by the Junior Branch by a female Heiress in late 14th Century.

=== Lancaster ===
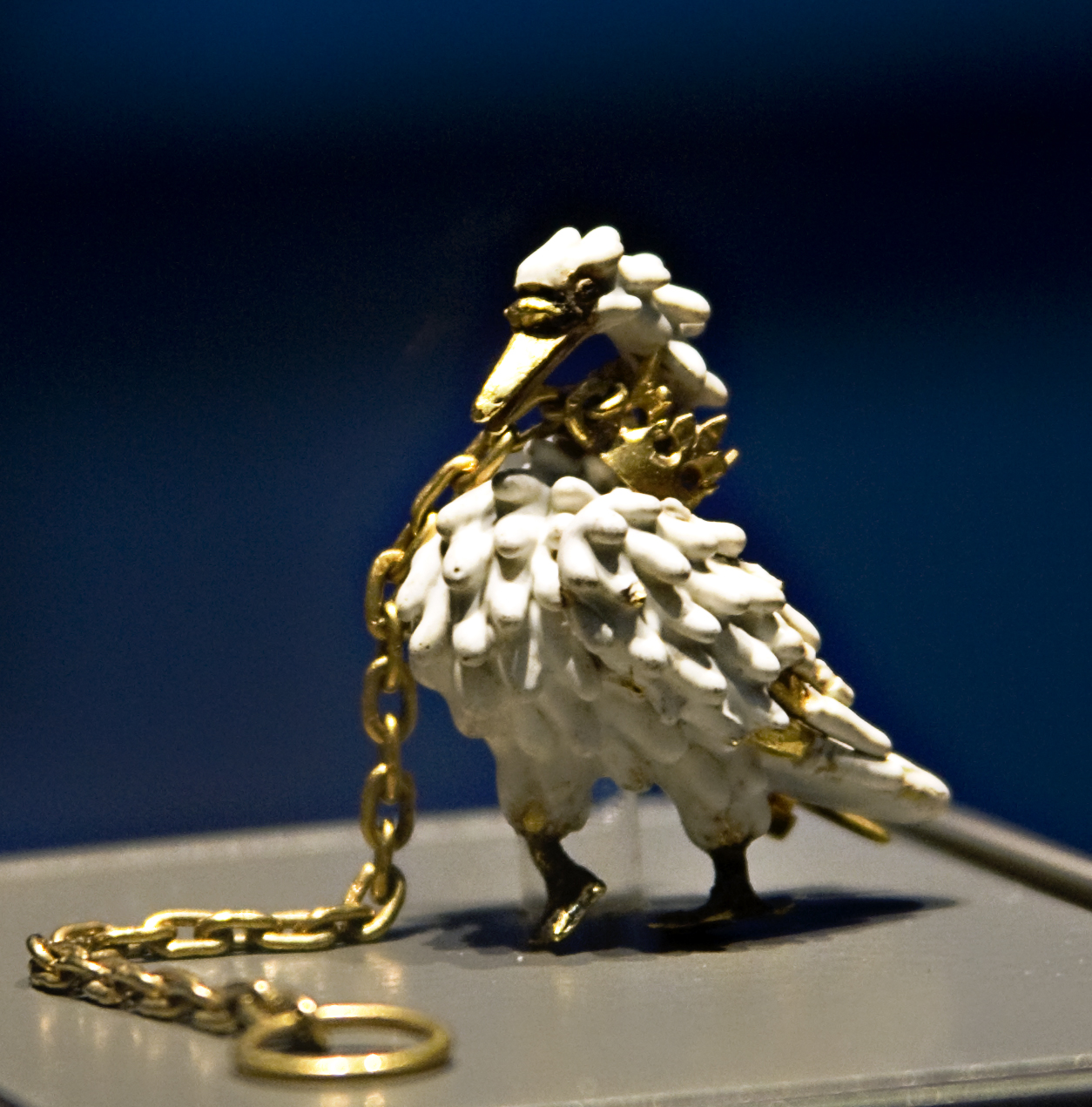
The Dunstable Swan Jewel, circa 1400, British Museum. Possibly given to his supporters by the future King Henry V, who was Prince of Wales from 1399

After the marriage in 1380 of Mary de Bohun (d. 1394) to the Lancastrian Henry Bolingbroke, the future King Henry IV (1399–1413), the swan was adopted by the royal House of Lancaster, which continued to use it for over a century. The swan gorged and chained with a crown or is especially associated with Lancastrian use and echoes the white hart similarly gorged and chained used by King Richard II (1377–1399), deposed by Henry Bolingbroke, which he began to use as a livery badge from 1390. Richard II's treasure roll of 1397 includes, together with several of his own white hart badges, a swan badge with a gold chain, perhaps presented by one of his Lancastrian enemies mentioned above: "Item, a gold swan enamelled white with a little gold chain hanging around the neck, weighing 2 oz., value, 46s. 8d". He declared to Parliament that he had exchanged liveries with his uncles as a sign of amity at various moments of reconciliation.

After Henry Bolingbroke seized the throne in 1399, the use of the swan emblem was transferred to his son, the future King Henry V (1413–1422), who was made Prince of Wales at his father's coronation, and whose tomb in Westminster Abbey displays motifs of swans.

The Dunstable Swan Jewel made in about 1400 is presumed to have been intended as a livery badge possibly given to his supporters by the future Henry V of England, who was Prince of Wales from 1399. It is in the form of a white enamelled swan gorged with a gold collar in the form of a crown with six fleur-de-lys tines, held by a gold chain.

The Bohun swan was also used by Henry V's grandson Edward of Westminster, Prince of Wales, who died in the Battle of Tewkesbury in 1471. In 1459 Edward's mother Margaret of Anjou insisted that he should give swan livery badges to "all the gentlemen of Cheshire"; the type and number are unknown.

=== Stafford ===
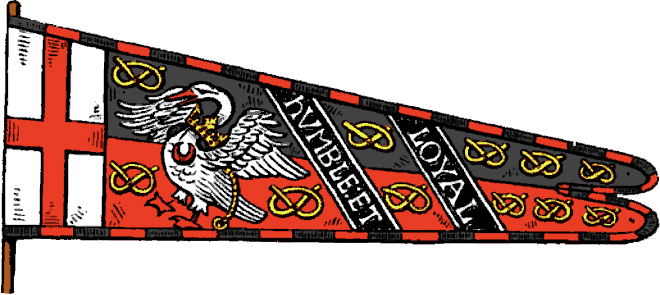
Standard of Henry Stafford, 2nd Duke of Buckingham, about 1475, displays badges of the Stafford knot and Bohun swan

Eleanor de Bohun, Mary's sister, had in 1376 also married into the Plantagenet royal family, in the person of Thomas of Woodstock, 1st Duke of Gloucester (d. 1397), another prominent Lancastrian supporter, the youngest son of King Edward III, and the swan badge was used by his Stafford descendants, but as a secondary badge to their own Stafford knot. The de Bohun sisters Mary and Eleanor were co-heiresses to the huge Bohun estates, and disputes over the settlement of these continued until late into the next century, when most of their descendants had been killed in the Wars of the Roses, perhaps encouraging the continued assertion of Bohun ancestry. Henry Stafford, 2nd Duke of Buckingham, a descendant of the Beauchamps, of Eleanor de Bohun, of Thomas of Woodstock and of John of Gaunt, used the swan with crown and chain as his own badge. He was certainly active in trying to obtain possession of the Bohun lands, and appears also to have plotted to seize the throne, for which he was executed in 1483 by Richard III.

=== Courtenay ===
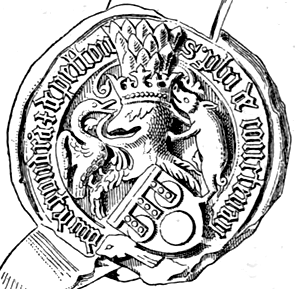
Seal of Sir Philip Courtenay (d.1463) of Powderham, showing the Bohun swan as the dexter supporter

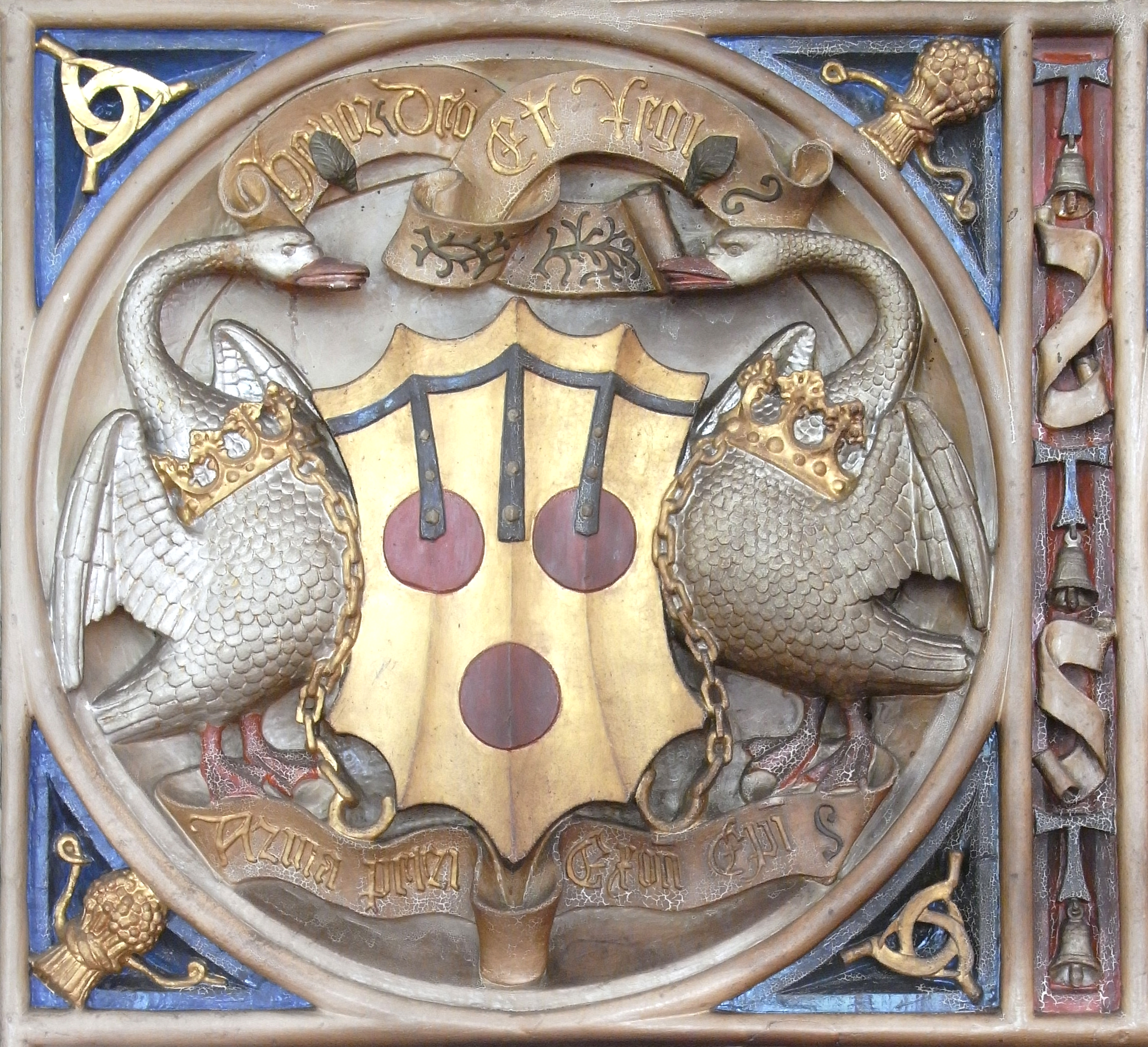
Arms of Peter Courtenay (d.1492), Bishop of Exeter and Bishop of Winchester: Or, 3 torteaux a label of 3 points azure each point charged with 3 plates in pale with supporters the Bohun swans, each collared with a crown and chained or. Detail from the Courtenay Mantlepiece, Bishop's Palace, Exeter

Another heir of the de Bohuns was the Courtenay family, Earls of Devon, descended from Margaret de Bohun (1311–1391), daughter and heiress of Humphrey de Bohun, 4th Earl of Hereford (1276–1322) and wife of Hugh de Courtenay, 2nd Earl of Devon (1303–1377). The Courtenays frequently used the Bohum swan as one of their supporters, with or in place of the usual Courtenay boar, on their heraldic achievements. Surviving examples are:

- Seal of Sir Philip Courtenay (d.1463) of Powderham, showing the Bohun swan as the dexter supporter.
- Courtenay Mantlepiece, Bishop's Palace, Exeter, showing the arms of Peter Courtenay (d.1492), Bishop of Exeter and Bishop of Winchester: Or, 3 torteaux a label of 3 points azure each point charged with 3 plates in pale with supporters the Bohun swans, each collared with a crown and chained or.

==== Luttrell of Dunster ====
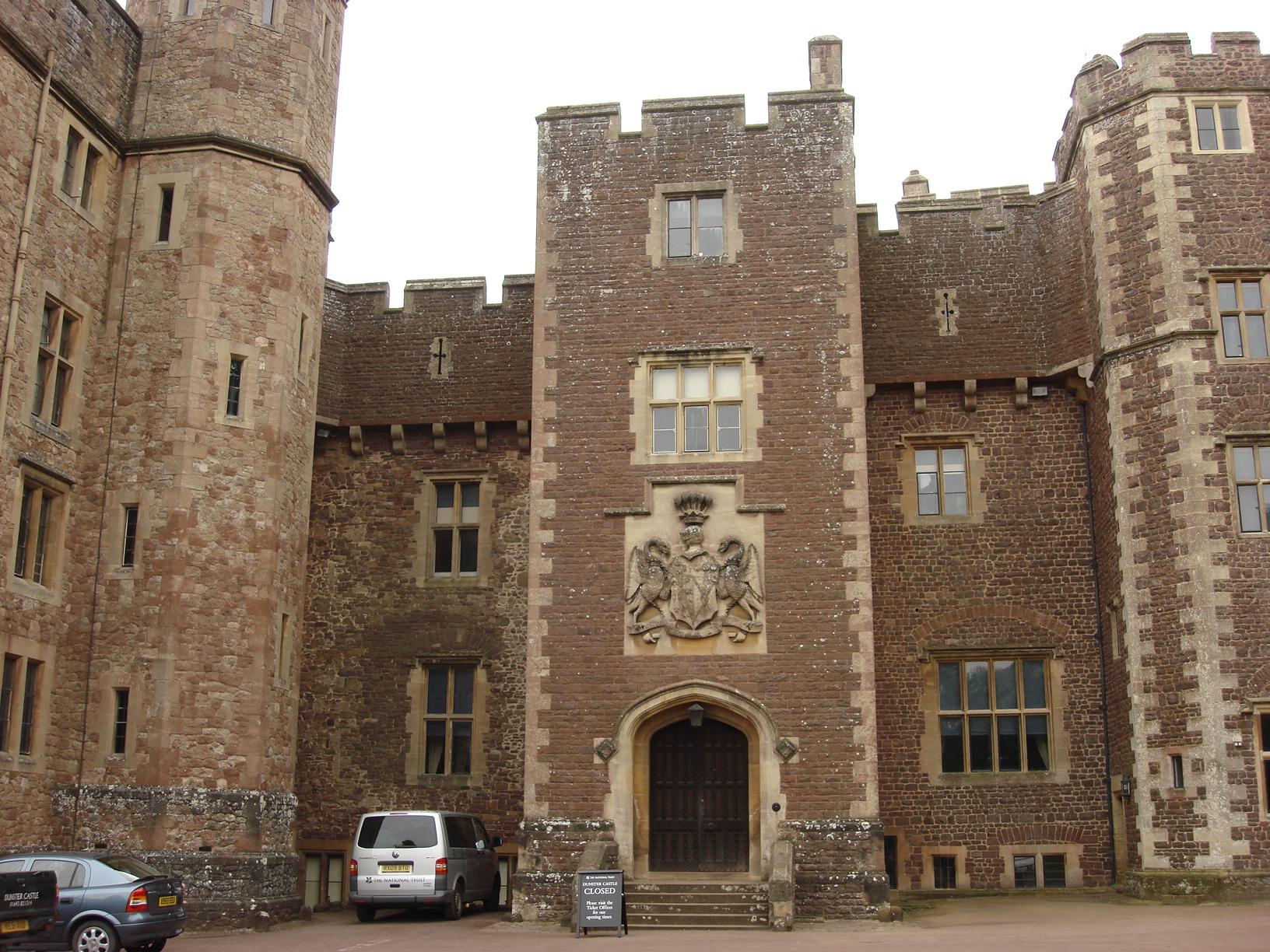
Bohun swan supporters with arms of George Fownes Luttrell (1826–1910) impaling Hood, 19th century remodelling of main entrance door to Dunster Castle

The Luttrell family, feudal barons of Dunster, of Dunster Castle in Somerset, also used the Bohun swan as supporters. This was due to their descent from the Courtenays. Sir Andrew Luttrell (d.1378/81) of Chilton, in the parish of Thorverton, Devon, married Elizabeth Courtenay (d.1395), widow of Sir John de Vere, son of the Earl of Oxford, and a daughter of Hugh de Courtenay, 2nd Earl of Devon (1303–1377) by his wife Margaret de Bohun (d.1391), eldest surviving daughter of Humphrey de Bohun, 4th Earl of Hereford, by Elizabeth, daughter of King Edward I. In 1374 Elizabeth Luttrell purchased the reversion of Dunster Castle and manor, the manors of Minehead and Kilton, and the hundred of Carhampton from Lady Mohun, the wife of Sir John V de Mohun, 2nd Baron Mohun (c.1320–1375), feudal baron of Dunster. Dunster Castle continued to be held by her descendants until 1976. Bohun swan supporters survive on the Easter Sepulchre monument of Hugh Luttrell (died 1522) of Dunster, in St Mary's Church, East Quantoxhead, Somerset. A modern example is on the huge stone sculpted heraldic achievement of George Fownes Luttrell (1826–1910) above the new main entrance door to the castle, built as part of his remodelling. The Bohun swan also features in the centre of the "Luttrell Table Carpet" (c.1520), now in the Burrell Collection in Glasgow.

==== Buckinghamshire ====
Flag of Buckinghamshire

The Flag of Buckinghamshire uses the Bohun swan on its flag as it dates back to the Anglo-Saxon times, when Buckinghamshire was known for breeding swans for the king.

== Sources ==
- Cherry, John. "The Dunstable Swan Jewel", Journal of the British Archaeological Association, XXXII, 1969
- Stratford, Jenny, The swan badge and the Dunstable Swan, and other pages as specified, in Richard II's Treasure; the riches of a medieval king, website by The Institute of Historical Research and Royal Holloway, University of London, 2007
