= Guy Bryan, 1st Baron Bryan =

English admiral and peer

Guy Bryan
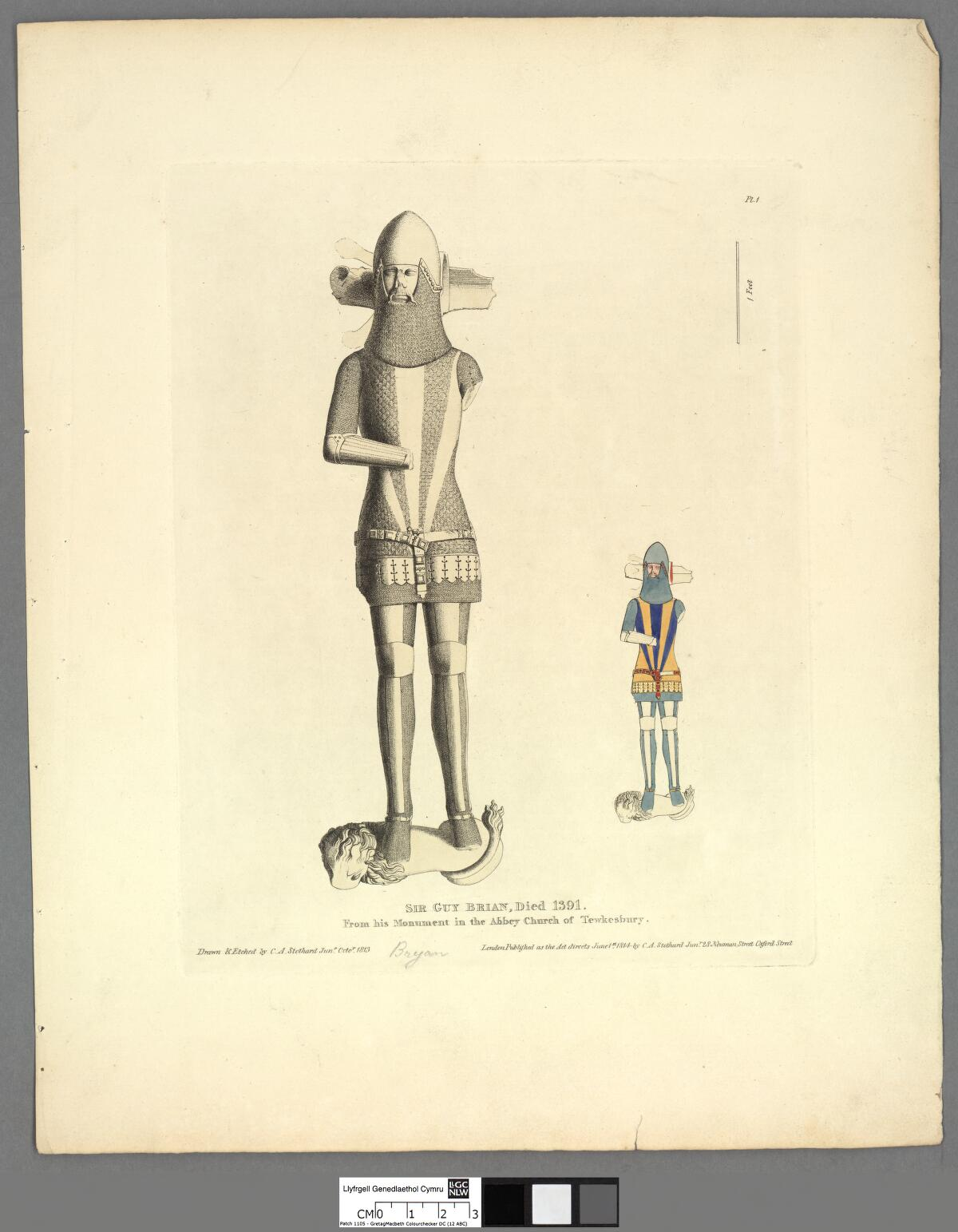
- Guy Bryan, 1st Baron Bryan (portrait from the Welsh Portrait Collection at the National Library of Wales.
- Born: about 1319
- Died: 17 August 1390
- Burial place: Tewkesbury Abbey, Gloucestershire, England
- Military career
- Allegiance: England
- Service years: 1337–1372
- Commands: Admiral of the West
- Conflicts: Battle of Crécy; Battle off Sluys

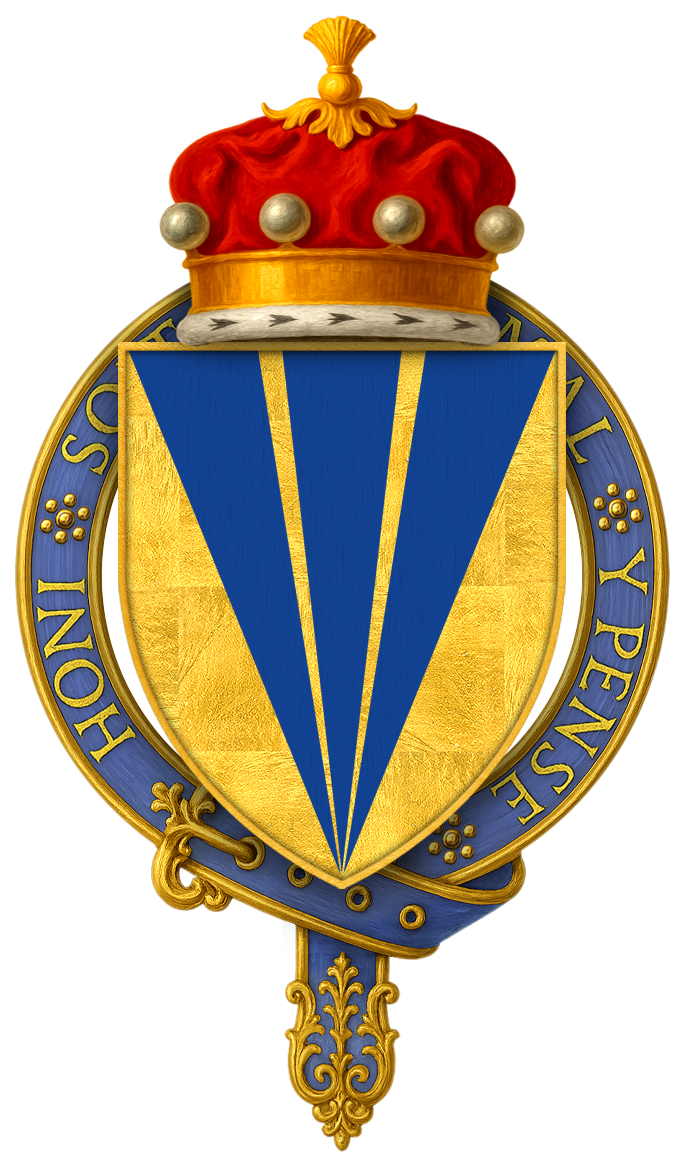
Arms of Sir Guy de Bryan, 1st Baron Bryan, KG: Or, three piles conjoined in point azure

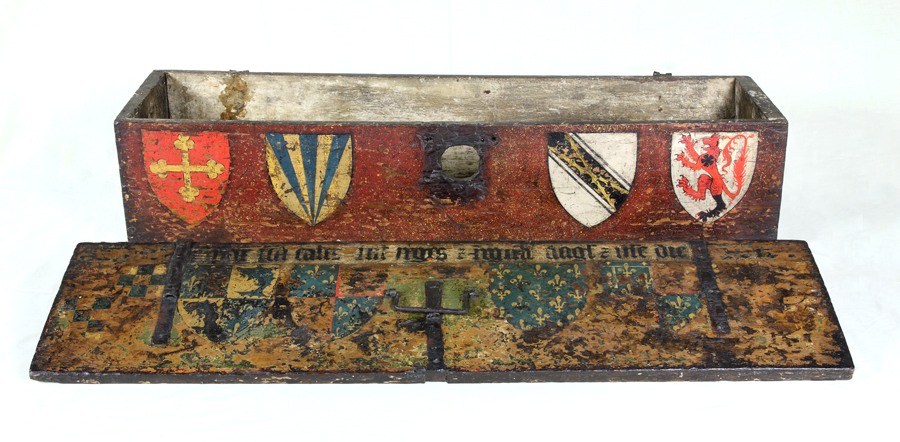
Arms of Guy de Bryan on a chest made to hold the Treaty of Calais, signed in 1360 between Edward III of England and John II of France

Guy Bryan, 1st Baron Bryan, KG (born before 1319 and died 17 August 1390) was an English landowner, military and naval commander, courtier, diplomat, and administrator.

== Origins ==
Born sometime before 1319, he was the son of Sir Guy Bryan (died 1349), of Walwyn's Castle in Pembrokeshire and Torbryan in Devon, and his wife Joan Carew (died after 1347), daughter of Sir John Carew (died 1324) and his wife Joan Talbot. His paternal grandparents were Guy Bryan (died about 1307) and his wife Sibyl Sudeley nee Say, Daughter of William Say and Sybil Marshal.

== Career ==
He served on the English side in the Second War of Scottish Independence and in France and Flanders during the Hundred Years' War. In 1339 he was made Steward of “Haveral” Castle in Pembrokeshire, followed in 1341 by appointment as Warden of the Forest of Dean, in Gloucestershire, and Governor of St Briavel's Castle, the seat of the Warden, which offices he held until his death. The year 1341 also saw additional lands in Devon being granted, in particular the port town of Dartmouth, of which he was recognised as lord in 1343. He was also granted rights over the taxation of trade in London.

On 26 August 1346 he was named a Knight Bachelor. In 1349, he was temporarily Keeper of the Great Seal of England, and in 1350 was granted an annuity of 200 marks for bearing the King's Standard against the French at Calais. From 25 November 1350 onwards, he was regularly summoned to Parliament, by which he may be held to have been created Baron Bryan. Also in 1350, he was given free warren over his lands at Torbryan and Slapton. On 1 March 1356 he was appointed Admiral of the West, a post he held till 18 July 1360. In 1359 he acquired the manor of Northam and was also appointed Lord Steward of the Royal Household.

In 1361, he was England's ambassador to Pope Innocent VI. From 1366 onwards he was regularly a justice of the peace for Devon and extended his landholdings into Dorset, acquiring the manor of Woodsford in 1367 and later that of Hazelbury Bryan. Following the death of Sir John Chandos on 31 December 1369, he was made a Knight of the Garter. On 3 May 1370 he was once again appointed Admiral of the West, until 6 October 1372. A further appointment in 1377 saw the failure of a proposed expedition against the French, to which he was to contribute 60 men-at-arms and 60 archers, cancelled when King Edward III died.

He died on 17 August 1390 and his tomb is in Tewkesbury Abbey.

== Marriages and children ==
Before 1344, he may have married Ann (some sources say Alice) Holway, daughter of William Holway who lived at Northlew, and with her may have had two daughters:

- Elizabeth Bryan (died before 1393), who married Robert Grey (died 21 May 1393), and had a daughter Isabella Grey, Baroness Poynings (died 11 April 1394)
- Philippa Bryan, who married first Edward Bohun (died 1362), secondly Sir Nicholas Bonham (died after 1373), and thirdly Sir John Chandos (died 1428).

Before 10 July 1350, he married Elizabeth Montagu (died 31 May 1359), widow of Hugh Despenser, 4th Baron Despenser and before him of Giles Badlesmere, 2nd Baron Badlesmere. Her parents were William Montagu, 1st Earl of Salisbury and his wife Catherine Grandison. They had four known children:

- Margaret Bryan (born about 1351), who married Hugh Courtenay (died 1374), son of Sir Hugh Courtenay, KG, and grandson of Hugh Courtenay, 2nd Earl of Devon.
- Sir Guy Bryan (born about 1353 and died before his father in 1386), who married Alice Bures (died 1435), daughter of Sir Robert Bures and his wife Joan Sutton. They had two daughters: Philippa Bryan (born about 1378) and Elizabeth Bryan (born about 1381).
- Sir William Bryan (born about 1355 and died 22 September 1395), who married Joan FitzAlan (died 1404) and had one son Thomas Bryan (died 1444).
- Sir Philip Bryan (born about 1358 and died before his father by 14 February 1388), who married Joan Chudleigh (died 1422) and died childless.

His executrix was his daughter-in-law Alice and, according to the Complete Peerage, his heiresses were her two children, Philippa and Elizabeth. Any hereditary barony that may be held to have been created by the writ of 1350 fell, according to later doctrine, into abeyance. Sir Thomas Bryan assumed his arms at a later date.
