= John de Cheverston =

English noble

- Died: c.1375
- Father: William de Cheverston
- Mother: Matilda Pipard

John de Cheverston, Captain of Calais, Seneschal of Gascony was a 14th-century English noble.

== Life ==
John was a son of William de Cheverston, Lord of Cheverston and Matilda Pipard. He was captain of Calais in 1347 and Seneschal of Gascony in 1350-1351, 1354 and 1362. He led the English forces during the Battle of Saintes on 1 April 1351, which was a victory for the English. He died c.1375, with his lands being inherited by his wife Joan's brother Philip de Courtenay.

== Marriage and issue ==
Cheverston married firstly Thomasina and had issue, which little is known. He married secondly Joan, daughter of Hugh de Courtenay, Earl of Devon and Margaret de Bohun, by whom he no issue.
