= Hugh Luttrell (MP, died 1428) =

Member of the Parliament of England

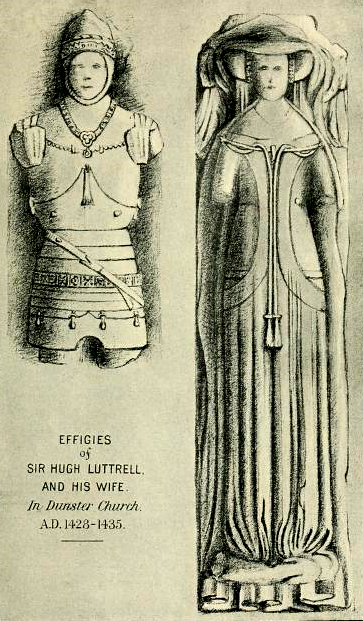
Drawing circa 1909 of alabaster effigies in Dunster Church thought (by Maxwell-Lyte (1909)) to represent of Sir Hugh Luttrell (c.1364-1428) of Dunster Castle and his wife Catherine Beaumont (d.1435)

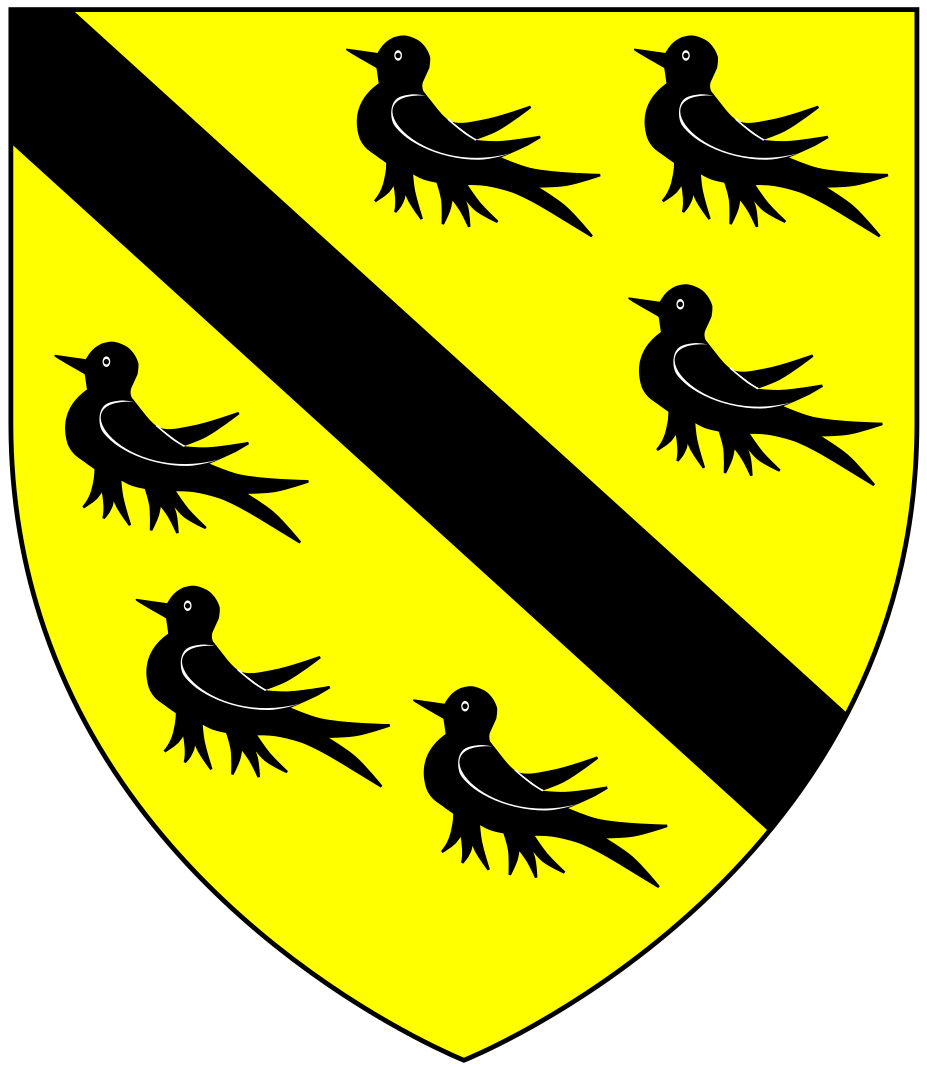
Arms of Luttrell: Or, a bend between six martlets sable

Sir Hugh Luttrell (about 1364 – 24 March 1428), of Dunster Castle in Somerset, feudal baron of Dunster, was an English nobleman and politician, who was an important military officer during the Hundred Years' War. He was a close associate of his cousin, King Richard II of England, and was one of his most valuable advisors. He was also an esquire of John of Gaunt, and an extremely close friend to Queen Anne of Bohemia.

He was an MP for Somerset and Devon.

== Biography ==
Sir Hugh Luttrell was born in Dunster, a son of Elizabeth Courtenay (d. 7 August 1395), great-granddaughter of Edward I of England, and her second husband Sir Andrew Lutrell of Chilton. Sir Andrew was a direct descendant of an Irish noble family: the Luttrells, who were the original Earls of Carhampton. The family had strong ties with the Plantagenets, to which they were related. Given her loyal servitude to the royal family, Elizabeth received £200 from her close cousin, Richard II of England. Courtenay used this loan to buy large properties of land, which increased the family's wealth by leaps and bounds. This act would make Sir Hugh famous throughout England.

In 1378, Hugh's father died abruptly, and, in 1379, he began his own career. When he was about 16, he became an esquire to John of Gaunt. He served Gaunt for about 12 years, and switched his services to the English Queen, Anne of Bohemia. They became very close, and Anne granted him numerous plots of land for his servitude and good nature, which boosted his social standing among the English nobility. Hugh again switched his services, this time to his cousin, Richard II. Hugh soon became the bearer of numerous titles.

Sir Hugh's loyalty to Richard II was unbreakable, right up to his imprisonment. After all, he was one of the King's closest retainers and advisors. After the monarch's murder, Hugh felt sorrow for his cousin. However, his switching sides to the new king, Henry IV of England (also known as Henry of Bolingbroke), doubled his fortunes drastically. He flourished during Henry's reign, mostly because of his family's prominence, and usefulness to the king. In 1400, he sailed to Calais, in the company of his uncle, Sir Peter, who had become the commander of the English garrison there. Luttrell spent three years being the deputy Lieutenant of Calais (1400–1403), and devoted his time in that job to politics. He discussed numerous peace talks with French officials, and numerous other governmental matters.

In 1403, he was assigned with Sir Thomas Swineburn and John Urban to renew a peace treaty with Flanders. The talks were harsh, as surviving documents say, and the three Englishmen left Flanders, with an impression that the Flemings were not to be trusted.

When he arrived back in England in 1404, he was elected to the English Parliament for the first time, and faced a serious dilemma. On 6 October 1404, Lady Mohun, a noblewoman that had sold vast plots of land to Hugh's late mother, Elizabeth, had died at Canterbury. This was a serious blow to Luttrell, who had inherited Mohun's estates from his mother. After Lady Mohun's death, her heirs and Luttrell began a fierce legal battle over who would own the estates. The battle went in Hugh's favor for a period of time, when copies of Mohun's will were handed over to him. The crown gave him full seisin over the properties, and the legal battle quieted down for a while. However, the legal battle had to be resolved, and in May 1405 Parliament intervened. A year passed with no clear victor, and the House of Commons of England stepped in, this time on Luttrell's side. The debating went on for two more years, and in 1408 Luttrell prevailed, paying 100 marks for his succession to the barony.

Through 1406–1414, little was known of Hugh's activities. It is known that he was present at Glastonbury Abbey in 1408, with scores of other influential noblemen. It was then and there that Archbishop Thomas Arundel made a visit to them, and discussed important political and religious matters with the noblemen. In 1410, the Queen of England, Joan of Navarre, made Luttrell her steward, a task which he enjoyed.

When Henry V of England ascended to the throne in 1415, Sir Hugh's popularity increased. He traveled to France with the English army, to re-incite the Hundred Years' War. He proved to be a daring leader, and was one of the key commanders at the Siege of Harfleur, and at the Siege of Rouen. After the siege, he returned home to England, and in 1417, he entered the service of Henry V, becoming one of his most loyal retainers. Throughout the rest of his life, he would have a splendid relationship with the king.

In February 1417, he was appointed Lieutenant of Harfleur and embarked to France, where the war was still being fought, in the retinue of Thomas Montacute, 4th Earl of Salisbury. Luttrell had his own private battalion, consisting of 20 men-at-arms and 60 archers. After assuming command over the city of Harfleur in 1418, he was given orders by his superiors to manage the English garrison there, and hang any deserters.

During that same year, Sir Hugh negotiated the surrender of the French Captains of Montivilliers and Fécamp. In 1419, he also negotiated the surrender of the town of Montreuil, and many others. In July 1419, Luttrell was appointed the Royal Seneschal of Normandy by Henry V, a position he held for two years (1419–1421).

Sir Hugh thus became the ruler of one of the most important places in medieval France. Luttrell was thrilled with governing his new domain, describing himself as the "gret Seneschal of Normandie." Sir Hugh kept Normandy under the mighty fist of the English, which Henry V of England benefited from greatly. In 1420, Luttrell corresponded with the king many times, praising Henry's marriage to Catherine of Valois, saying in a letter that it caused him: "the gretest gladnesse and consolation that ever came unto my herte." He also reported to King Henry about the state of the country, saying: "ther ys no steryng of none evyl doers (there is no stirring of none evil-doers)", and also informed the king of the poverty of the country.

In 1421, he was relieved of his duties as Seneschal of Normandy and Lieutenant of Harfleur, and was ordered to return to England. Upon arriving in England, Hugh met with many members of English nobility, and royal officials. He was also occupied with many royal assignments, which continued up to his death.

== Death ==
On 24 March 1428, Sir Hugh Luttrell fell gravely ill and died on a visit to his daughter, Joan, a nun at Shaftesbury. A large funeral procession followed his coffin on the way to Dunster. After he was buried, a monument was built in his memory at the Dunster church. At that moment, one of the most influential figures in medieval England, a man who had lived through three reigns, was put to rest.

== Marriage and progeny ==
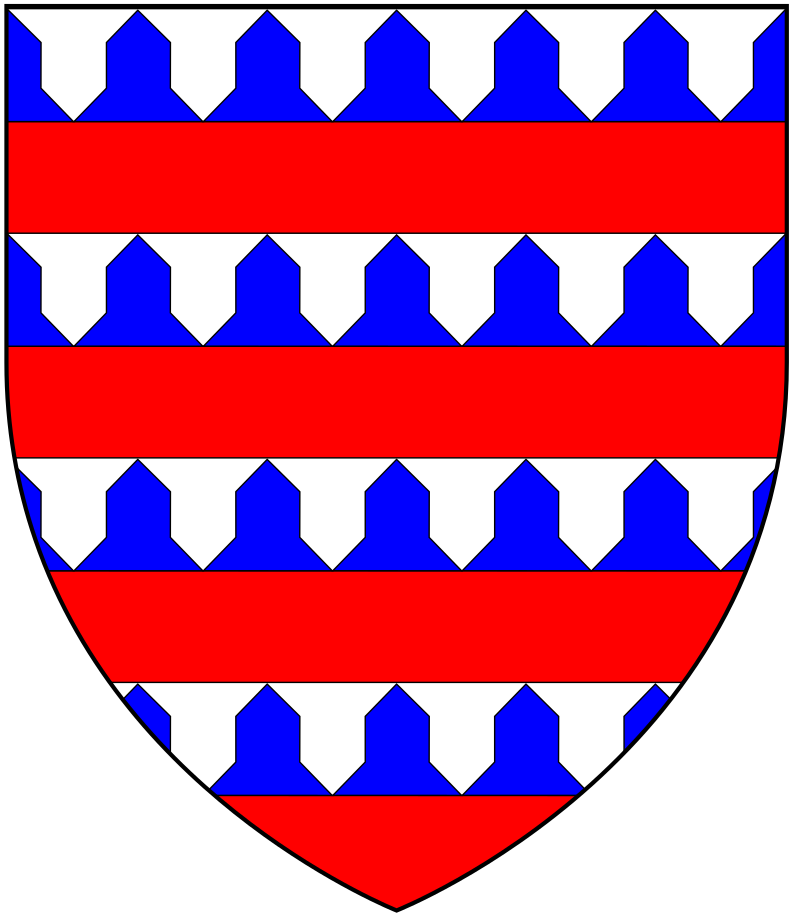
Arms of Beaumont of Shirwell: Barry of six vair and gules

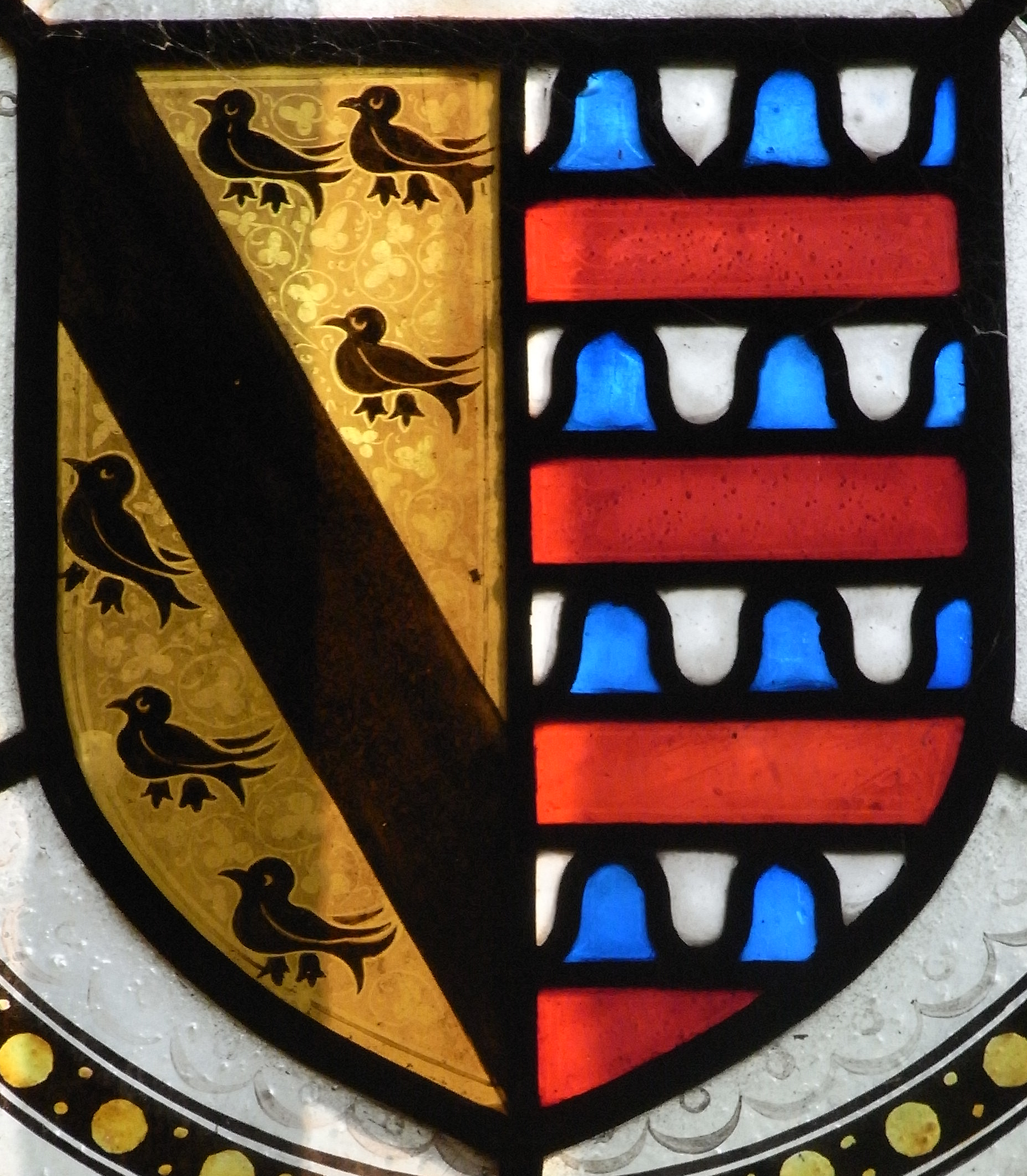
Arms of Sir Hugh Luttrell (c.1364-1428) (Or, a bend between six martlets sable) impaling arms of Beaumont of Shirwell, Devon, (Barry of six vair and gules, here shown incorrectly as barry of eight), the family of his wife Catherine Beaumont (d. 1435). Detail from 19th century Luttrell heraldic stained-glass windows, south wall of Dunster Church

In 1384, Sir Hugh Luttrell married Catherine Beaumont (d. 28 August 1435), a daughter of Sir John Beaumont (d.1379/80) of Shirwell and Saunton in North Devon, MP for Devon 1376–80, a substantial landowner in Devon, by his second wife Joan Crawthorne, granddaughter and heiress of Sir Robert Stockey, MP in 1318, of Crawthorne and Cranstone. Alabaster effigies survive in Dunster Church of himself and his wife, badly mutilated. The arms of Beaumont (Barry of six vair and gules) appear in Dunster Church and on the Luttrell Table Carpet, c.1520, now in the collection of the Burrell Collection in Glasgow, probably made in about 1520 to record the marriage of his descendant Sir Andrew Luttrell (1484–1538) of Dunster and his wife Margaret Wyndham (d.1580). By his wife he had six children:

- Sir John Luttrell (c.1394-1430), eldest son and heir, of Dunster, who in about 1422 married Margaret Tuchet (d.1438), daughter of John Tuchet, 4th Baron Audley (1371-1408). He was buried probably at Bruton Priory.
- William Luttrell, rector of Birch Parva in Essex from 1441 to 1443.
- Margaret Luttrell, married John Cotes, esquire.
- Elizabeth Luttrell, married, firstly about 1406, William Harleston (d. 1416) and secondly, after 1423, John Stratton, esq. of Lye Hall, Weston, Norfolk.
- Anne Luttrell, married William Godwyn the younger.
- Joan Luttrell, a nun of Shaftesbury.
