= Peter Courtenay (KG) =

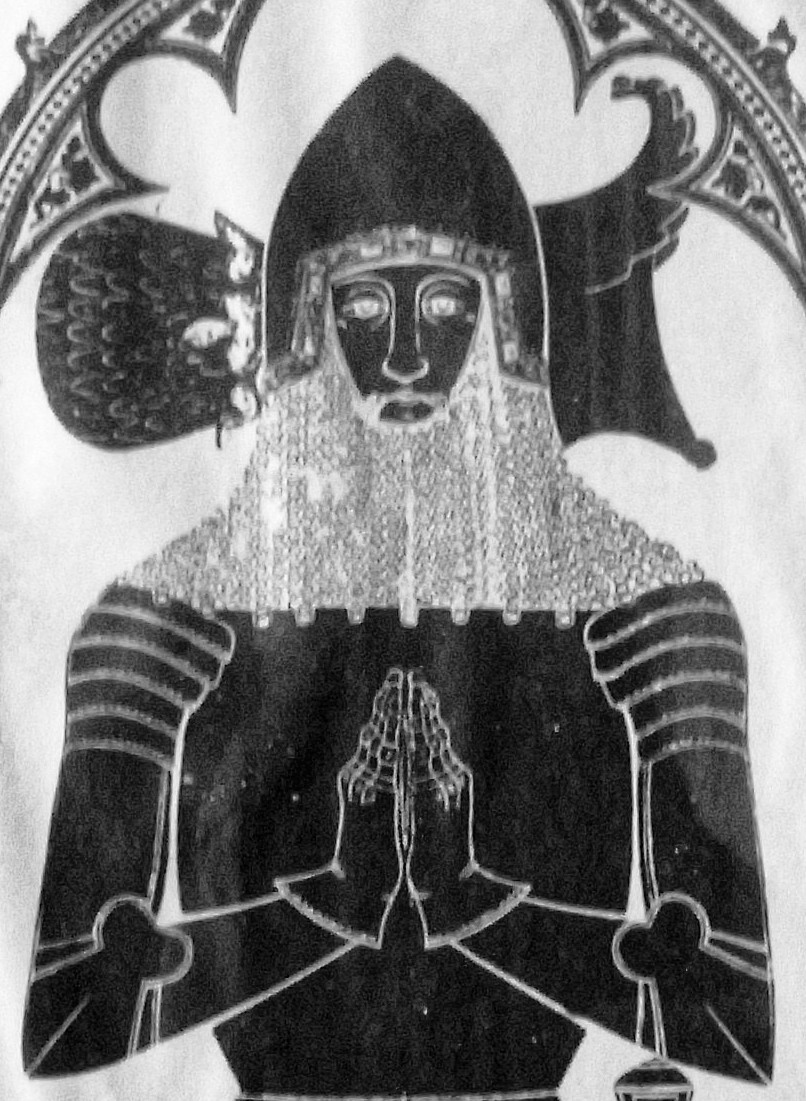
- Detail from rubbing of Courtenay's monumental brass in Exeter Cathedral
- Born: 1346
- Died: 2 February 1405 (aged 58–59)
- Spouse: Margaret Clyvedon
- Parents: Hugh de Courtenay (father); Margaret de Bohun (mother)
- Relatives: Hugh Courtenay (brother); William Courtenay (brother); Philip Courtenay (brother)

Sir Peter Courtenay (1346–1405) was a soldier, knight of the shire, Chamberlain to King Richard II and a famous jouster. His principal seat was Hardington Mandeville, Somerset.

== Biography ==
He was the fifth son of Hugh de Courtenay, 2nd Earl of Devon (1303–1377) by his wife Margaret de Bohun (died 1391). He had several highly prominent elder brothers, but was the most flamboyant of them all:

- Sir Hugh Courtenay, KG, (1326–1349).
- Thomas Courtenay, Prebendary of Cutton, cleric.
- Sir Edward Courtenay (1329–1372). Born at Haccombe, Devon. He was an ancestor of Edward Courtenay, 1st Earl of Devon (1485 creation) (died 1509).
- Robert Courtenay of Moreton
- William Courtenay (1342–1396), Archbishop of Canterbury.
- Sir Philip Courtenay (c.1345–1406) of Powderham.

Courtenay was knighted by the Black Prince after the Battle of Najera in 1367, at the same time as his brother Sir Philip. In 1378 whilst on a naval expedition with his brother Sir Philip, under the command of Richard FitzAlan, 11th Earl of Arundel and William de Montacute, 2nd Earl of Salisbury, the fleet was attacked by Spaniards off the coast of Brittany and Sir Peter and his brother were captured. His ransom was paid by two wealthy burgesses of Bristol.

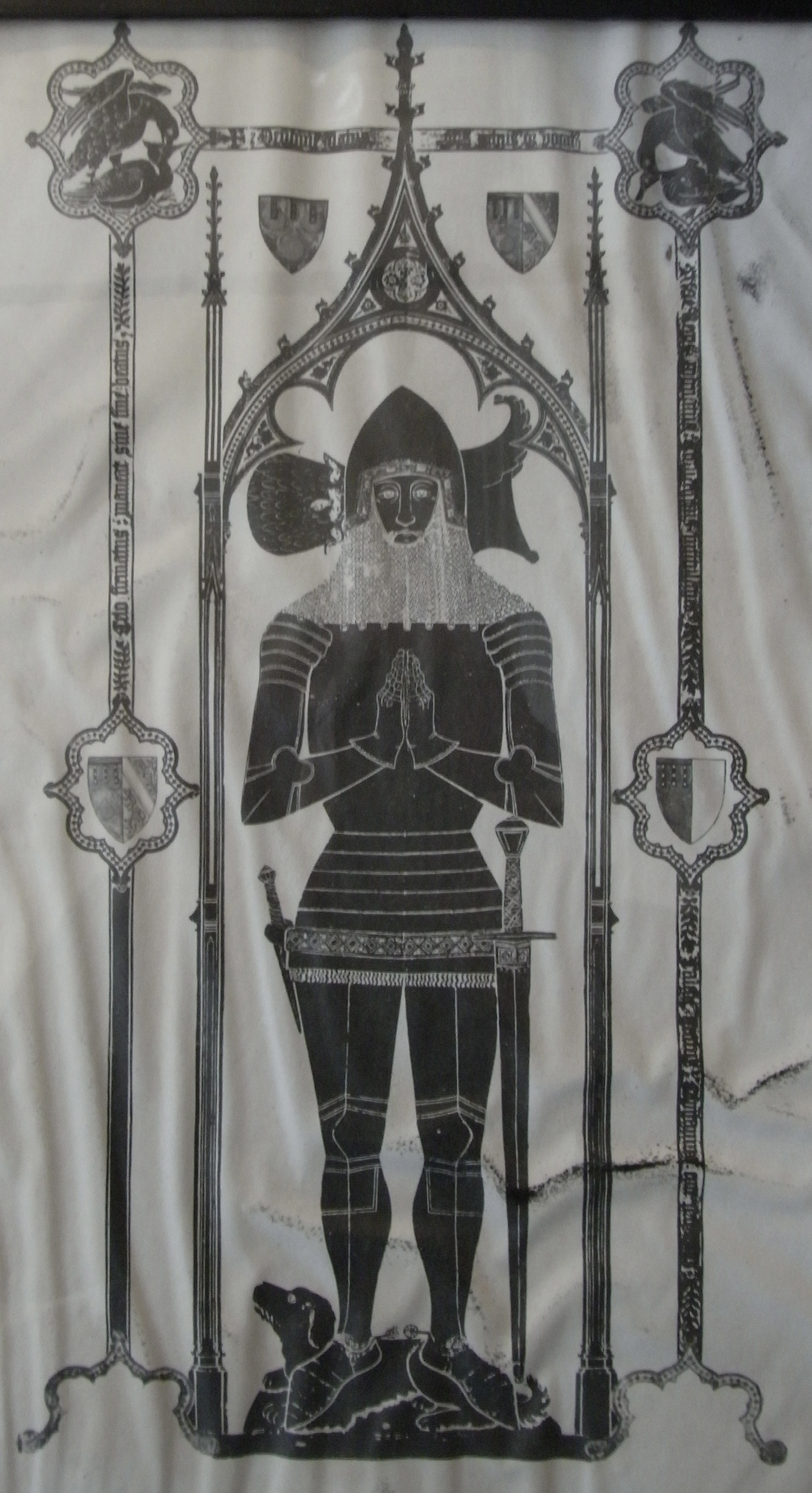
Rubbing from Courtenay's monumental brass in Exeter Cathedral

Courtenay married Margaret Clyvedon, daughter of John de Clyvedon by his wife Elizabeth. He died on 2 February 1405 and was buried in Exeter Cathedral, where his monumental brass, much worn-away, exists set into a slab in the floor of the south aisle. It was reported by Lysons in 1822 as being then situated further to the west in or near the now demolished Courtenay chantry chapel, near to the chest tomb of his parents, which has also been moved. He is shown full-length, in armour, with hands together in prayer. His figure is surrounded by a ledger line on which was formerly visible the following inscribed Latin verse, transcribed by John Prince in his Worthies of Devon:

Devoniae natus, comitis Petrusque vocatus,
Regis cognatus, camerarius intitulatus:
Calisiae gratus, capitaneus ense probatus.
Vitae privatus, fuit hinc super astra relatus.
Et quia sublatus, de mundo transit amatus.
Caelo firmatus, maneat, sine fine beatus.

Prince included the following English translation:

The Earl of Devonshire's son, Peter by name,
Kin to the King, Lord Chamberlain of fame.
Captain of Calais, for arms well approved;
Who dying, was above the stars removed.
And well beloved, went from the world away,
To lead a blessed life in Heaven for aye.
