= Battle of Saintes =

Battle during the Hundred Years' War

- Part of the Hundred Years' War
Date	1 April 1351
Location	Saintes, France 45.7464°N 0.6333°W
Result	English victory

Belligerents
Kingdom of England	Kingdom of France

Commanders and leaders
Arnaud-Amanieu; John de Cheverston	Guy II de Nesle (POW); Arnoul d'Audrehem (POW)
- Location within Nouvelle-Aquitaine

The Battle of Saintes was fought on 1 April 1351 during the Hundred Years' War between French and English forces. The French were besieging the town of Saint-Jean-d'Angély when an English relief force arrived. The English force was victorious, but was unable to fulfill its mission, to resupply the besieged. The town fell to the French on 31 August.

== Background ==
Upon the accession of King John II of France in August 1350, John II ignored his father's King Philip VI's recent extension to the Truce of Calais, and prepared to raise an army for a campaign against the English garrisons in Saintonge. An army of several thousand men led by Guy II de Nesle and his deputy Arnoul d'Audrehem arrived before the town of Saint-Jean-d'Angély in February 1351 and laid siege to the town.

The English garrison of around six hundred men was under pressure due to winter stores almost being exhausted. The French had surrounded the town walls, which were in disrepair and had cut off the main trade roads leading south into the English County of Gascony. The French learning of a relieving force of several hundred men, led by the Seneschal of Gascony John de Cheverston and Arnaud-Amanieu, a detachment of the French army travelled through the night of 31 March, to intercept the English force.

The English force had no intention of breaking the siege, but was instead attempting to bring a supply train to the besieged town of Saint-Jean-d'Angély.

== Battle ==
After travelling through the night, de Nesle intercepted the English force about three miles outside the town of Saintes. Upon being intercepted the English dismounted, as was common practice at that time, formed up a line of battle and had their horses led to the rear. Guy de Nesle, also ordered most of his forces to dismount, except for small bodies of cavalry on each wing, the French then deployed along a stretch of high ground.

The battle was a short encounter that resulted in the French being routed. A separate English force of several hundred men from the nearby English garrisons of Taillebourg and Tonnay-Charente assaulted the French forces at their rear. Over six hundred French knights were killed or captured. Both Guy II de Nesle and his deputy Arnoul d’Audrehem were captured and paid heavy ransoms for their release.

== Aftermath ==
Although the English were victorious, Cheverston was unable to break through to Saint-Jean-d'Angély. A small English force, led by the commander of the Taillebourg garrison was able to resupply the garrison at Saint-Jean-d'Angély. Cheverston withdrew to Bordeaux and John II reinforced the army around Saint-Jean-d'Angély, which fell to the French on 31 August.
