= Hugh Courtenay (died 1374) =

English soldier and heir apparent to the earldom of Devon

Sir Hugh Courtenay
- Born: c.1345
- Died: 20 February 1374
- Noble family: Courtenay
- Spouses: Margaret de Bryan; Maud Holland
- Father: Sir Hugh Courtenay
- Mother: Elizabeth de Vere

Hugh Courtenay (c.1345 – 20 February 1374) was an English soldier and heir apparent to the earldom of Devon.

== Career ==
Hugh Courtenay was born about 1345, the only child of Sir Hugh Courtenay (22 March 1327 – after Easter term 1348) and Elizabeth de Vere. He was the grandson of Hugh Courtenay, 10th Earl of Devon (12 July 1303 – 2 May 1377), and became heir apparent to the earldom of Devon after the death of his father in 1348. Through his grandmother, Margaret de Bohun (3 April 1311 – 16 December 1391), he was a descendant of King Edward I.

Courtenay took part in the intervention in the Castilian civil war by Edward, the Black Prince, and was knighted by the Prince at Vitoria in 1367, together with King Peter of Castile, Courtenay's brother-in-law, Thomas Holland, 2nd Earl of Kent, and Courtenay's uncles, Peter Courtenay and Philip Courtenay. He also distinguished himself at the Battle of Nájera on 3 April 1367.

On 8 January 1371 he was summoned to Parliament by writ directed to Hugoni de Courteney le fitz, whereby he is held to have become Baron Courtenay.

Courtenay died without issue on 20 February 1374 during the lifetime of his grandfather, Hugh Courtenay, 10th Earl of Devon, and the earldom descended to Courtenay's cousin, Edward de Courtenay, 11th Earl of Devon.

== Marriages ==
Courtenay married firstly, Margaret de Bryan, daughter of Guy de Bryan and his first wife Joan, daughter of Sir John de Carew, and secondly, by papal dispensation dated 5 September 1363, Maud Holland, daughter of Thomas Holland, 1st Earl of Kent, and his wife, Joan, the daughter of Edmund of Woodstock, Earl of Kent. He had no issue by either wife.

In Easter Week 1380, Maud Holland, remarried, at Windsor Castle, to Waleran, Count of Ligny and St Pol (d. 19 April 1415). Maud died before 13 April 1392, and was buried at Westminster Abbey on 23 April.
