= John Mowbray, 3rd Baron Mowbray =

English peer (1310–1361)

John de Mowbray
- 3rd Baron Mowbray; 11th Baron of Thirsk
- Arms of the Mowbray Family
- Born: 29 November 1310; Hovingham, Yorkshire
- Died: 4 October 1361 (aged 50); York
- Buried: Franciscan Friars Minor, Bedford
- Noble family: House of Mowbray
- Spouses: Maud de Holand; Joan of Lancaster; Elizabeth de Vere
- Issue Detail: John de Mowbray, 4th Baron Mowbray; Blanche de Mowbray; Eleanor de Mowbray
- Father: John de Mowbray, 2nd Baron Mowbray
- Mother: Aline de Brewes

John (II) de Mowbray, 3rd Baron Mowbray (29 November 1310 – 4 October 1361) was the only son of John de Mowbray, 2nd Baron Mowbray, by his first wife, Aline de Brewes, daughter of William de Braose, 2nd Baron Braose. He was born in Hovingham, Yorkshire.

== Life ==
Mowbray's father, the 2nd Baron, sided with Thomas, 2nd Earl of Lancaster, at the Battle of Boroughbridge on 16 March 1322 against Edward II, and was taken prisoner at the battle. He was hanged at York on 23 March 1322, and his estates forfeited. His wife and son John were imprisoned in the Tower of London until Edward II was deposed by his wife, Queen Isabella, and Roger Mortimer, 1st Earl of March.

The Mowbrays were released in 1327. The 3rd Baron de Mowbray was reportedly in Edward III's good graces, being present in France in the War of the Breton Succession for the sieges of Nantes and Aguillon. He was also on the English side at the Battle of Neville's Cross in the Second War of Scottish Independence. He died of the plague at York on 4 October 1361, and was buried at the Friars Minor in Bedford.

== Marriages and issue ==
He married firstly, before 26 February 1322, Maud de Holand, daughter of Robert de Holland, 1st Baron Holand, by Maud la Zouche, daughter and coheiress of Alan la Zouche, 1st Baron la Zouche of Ashby. The marriage was later declared void. He married secondly, between 28 February 1327 and 4 June 1328, Joan of Lancaster, sixth and youngest daughter of Henry, 3rd Earl of Lancaster, by whom he had a son and two daughters:

- John de Mowbray, 4th Baron Mowbray.
- Blanche Mowbray (d. 21 July 1409), who was contracted to marry Edward de Montagu (d. before February 1359), son and heir apparent of Edward de Montagu, 1st Baron Montagu (died 3 July 1461), by Alice of Norfolk, daughter and heiress of Thomas of Brotherton; however the marriage did not take place. She married firstly, by papal dispensation dated 21 March 1349, John de Segrave (d. before 1 April 1353), son and heir apparent of John Segrave, 4th Baron Segrave by Margaret, Duchess of Norfolk, daughter and heiress of Thomas of Brotherton; secondly, as her second husband, Sir Robert Bertam (d.1363); thirdly, before 5 June 1372, Thomas de Poynings, 2nd Baron Poynings (d. before 25 June 1375), son and heir of Michael de Poynings, 1st Baron Poynings; fourthly, before 21 March 1378, Sir John de Worth (d. before 1 June 1391); and fifthly, before 5 November 1394, Sir John Wiltshire. She had no issue by any of her husbands.
- Eleanor Mowbray, who married firstly, as his second wife, Roger la Warr, 3rd Baron De La Warr (d. 27 August 1370), by whom she had a daughter, Joan La Warr, who married Thomas West, 1st Baron West; and secondly Sir Lewis Clifford of Princes Risborough, Buckinghamshire, brother of Hugh de Clifford.

He married thirdly, by papal dispensation of 4 May 1351, Elizabeth de Vere (d. 14 or 16 August 1375), widow of Sir Hugh Courtenay (d. before 2 September 1349), and daughter of John de Vere, 7th Earl of Oxford, by Maud de Badlesmere, daughter of Bartholomew de Badlesmere, 1st Baron Badlesmere. After Mowbray's death, his widow, Elizabeth de Vere, married, before 26 November 1368, Sir William de Cossington.

== Notes ==
Peerage of England
Preceded by John Mowbray I	Baron Mowbray; 1321–1361	Succeeded by John Mowbray III
