= Hugh de Courtenay, 2nd/10th Earl of Devon =

English noble (1303–1377)

Hugh de Courtenay
- 2nd/10th Earl of Devon
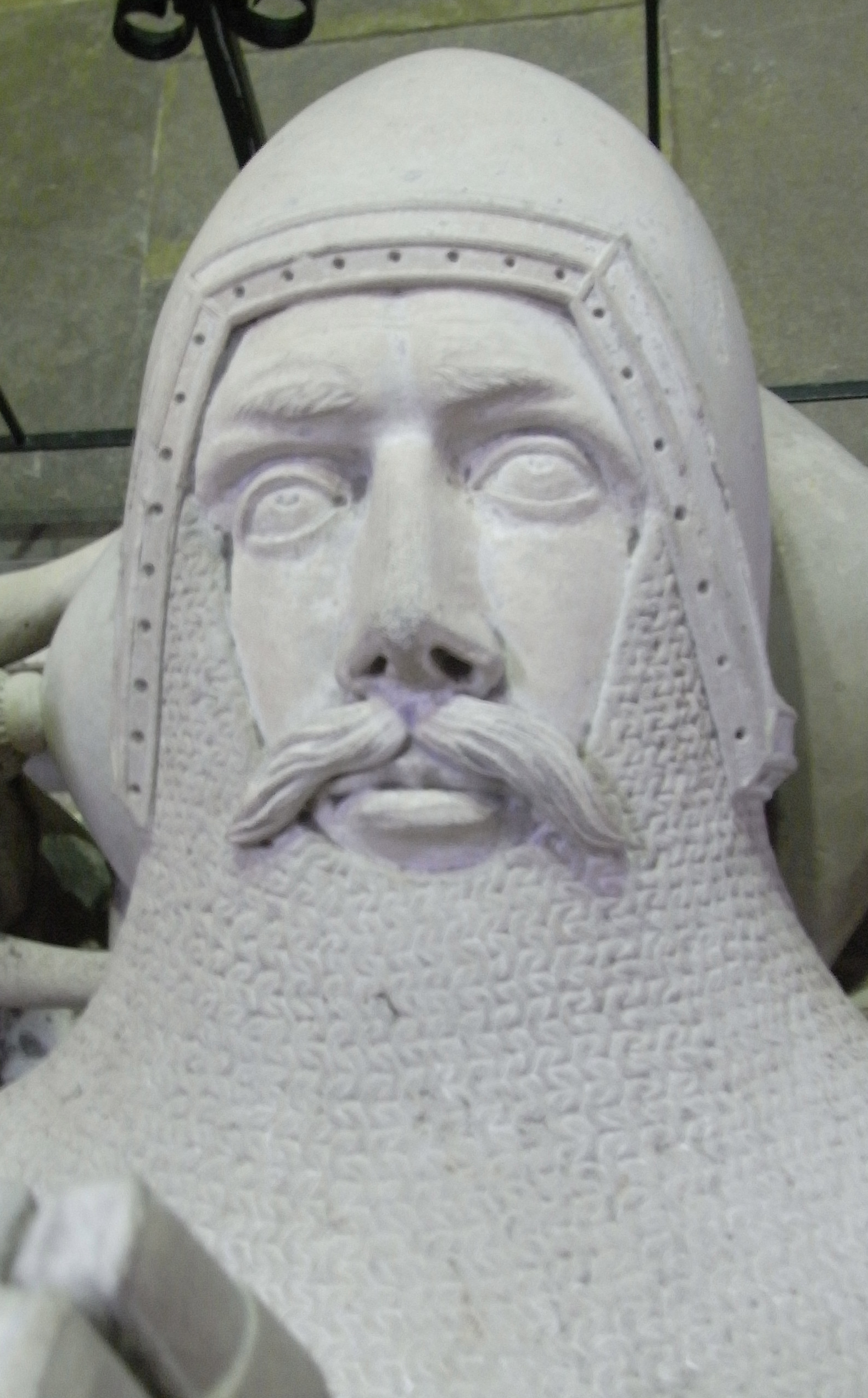
- Effigy (restored) of Hugh de Courtenay, 2nd/10th Earl of Devon, south transept, Exeter Cathedral
- Born: 12 July 1303
- Died: 2 May 1377 (aged 73)
- Noble family: Courtenay
- Spouse: Margaret de Bohun
- Issue: Sir Hugh Courtenay, KG; Thomas Courtenay; Sir Edward Courtenay; Robert Courtenay; William Courtenay, Archbishop of Canterbury; Sir Philip Courtenay; Sir Peter Courtenay, KG; Humphrey Courtenay; Margaret Courtenay (the elder); Elizabeth Courtenay; Katherine Courtenay; Anne Courtenay; Joan Courtenay; Margaret Courtenay (the younger) ______ Courtenay (7th daughter) ______ Courtenay (8th daughter) ______ Courtenay (9th daughter)
- Father: Hugh de Courtenay, 1st/9th Earl of Devon
- Mother: Agnes de Saint John

Arms of early Courtenay Earls of Devon: Or, three torteaux a label azure. These are the ancient arms of the House of Courtenay adopted c.1200 at the start of the age of heraldry with a label for difference. These arms are among several depicted (or re-created) on the heavily restored tomb of the 10th (2nd) Earl in Exeter Cathedral, but they are shown (without tinctures) on the monumental brass also at Exeter of his son, Sir Peter Courtenay, where they are impaled with Bohun

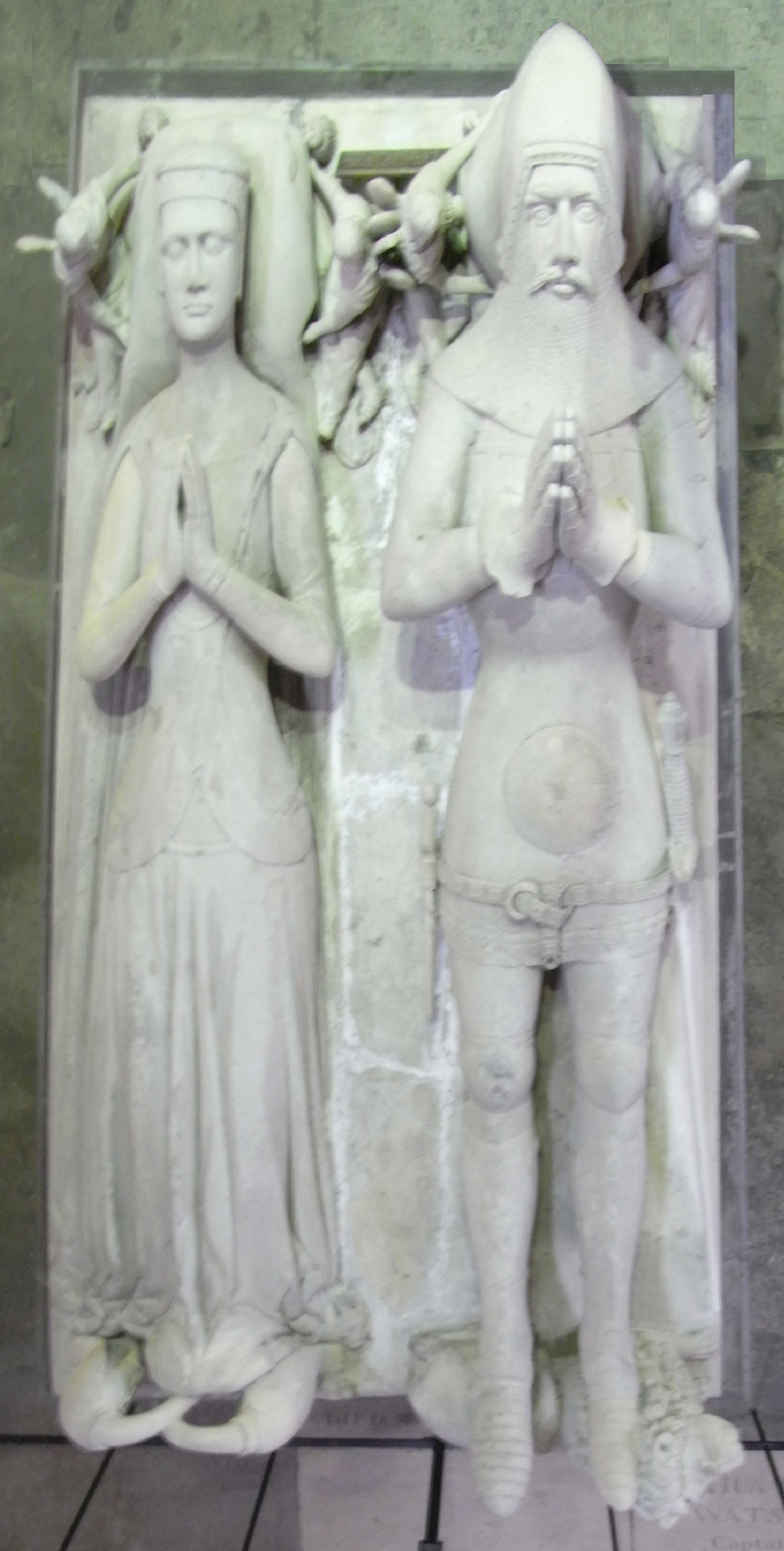
Effigies of Hugh de Courtenay, 10th Earl of Devon, and his wife, Margaret de Bohun, south transept, Exeter Cathedral.

Sir Hugh de Courtenay, 2nd/10th Earl of Devon (12 July 1303 – 2 May 1377), 2nd Baron Courtenay, feudal baron of Okehampton and feudal baron of Plympton, played an important role in the Hundred Years War in the service of King Edward III. His chief seats were Tiverton Castle and Okehampton Castle in Devon. The ordinal number given to the early Courtenay Earls of Devon depends on whether the earldom is deemed a new creation by the letters patent granted 22 February 1334/5 or whether it is deemed a restitution of the old dignity of the de Redvers family. Authorities differ in their opinions, and thus alternative ordinal numbers exist, given here.

== Origins ==
Hugh de Courtenay was born on 12 July 1303, the second son of Hugh de Courtenay, 1st/9th Earl of Devon (1276–1340), by his wife Agnes de Saint John, a daughter of Sir John de Saint John of Basing, Hampshire. He succeeded to the earldom on the death of his father in 1340. His elder brother, John de Courtenay (c.1296-11 July 1349), Abbot of Tavistock, as a cleric was unmarried and although he succeeded his father as feudal baron of Okehampton, did not succeed to the earldom.

== Career ==
By his marriage to Margaret de Bohun, Countess of Devon in 1325, Courtenay acquired the manor of Powderham; it was later granted by Margaret de Bohun to one of her younger sons, Sir Philip Courtenay (died 1406), whose family has occupied it until the present day, and who were recognised in 1831 as having been de jure Earls of Devon from 1556.

On 20 January 1327 Courtenay was made a knight banneret. In 1333 both he and his father were at the Battle of Halidon Hill. He was summoned to Parliament on 23 April 1337 by writ directed to Hugoni de Courteney juniori, by which he is held to have become Baron Courtenay during the lifetime of his father. In 1339 he and his father were with the forces which repulsed a French invasion of Cornwall, driving the French back to their ships. The 9th Earl died on 23 December 1340 at the age of 64. Courtenay succeeded to the earldom, and was granted livery of his lands on 11 January 1341.

In 1342 the Earl was with King Edward III's expedition to Brittany. Richardson states that the Earl took part on 9 April 1347 in a tournament at Lichfield. However, in 1347 he was excused on grounds of infirmity from accompanying the King on an expedition beyond the seas, and about that time, was also excused from attending Parliament, suggesting the possibility that it was the Earl's eldest son and heir, Hugh Courtenay, who had fought at the Battle of Crecy on 26 August 1346, who took part in the tournament at Lichfield.

In 1350 the King granted the Earl permission to travel for a year, and during that year he built the monastery of the White Friars in London. In 1352 he was appointed Joint Warden of Devon and Cornwall, and returned to Devon. In 1361, he and his wife were legatees in the will of her brother, Humphrey de Bohun, 6th Earl of Hereford, which greatly increased his wealth and land holdings.

== Later years ==
Courtenay made an important contribution to the result of the Battle of Poitiers in 1356. The Black Prince had sent the baggage train under Courtenay to the rear, which proved to be a wise manoeuvre as the long trail of wagons and carts blocked the narrow bridge and the escape route for the French. Courtenay played little part in the battle as a result of his defensive role. Courtenay retired with a full pension from the king. In 1373 he was appointed Chief Warden of the Royal Forests of Devon, the income of which in 1374 was assessed by Parliament at £1,500 per annum. He was one of the least wealthy of the English earls, and was surpassed in wealth by his fellow noble warriors the Earl of Arundel, Earl of Suffolk and Earl of Warwick. Nevertheless, he had a retinue of 40 knights, esquires and lawyers in Devon. He also held property by entail, including five manors in Somerset, two in Cornwall, two in Hampshire, one in Dorset and one in Buckinghamshire. He had stood as patron in the career of John Grandisson, Bishop of Exeter. He supported the taking-on of debt to build churches in the diocese of Exeter.

He died at Exeter on 2 May 1377 and was buried in Exeter Cathedral on the same day. His will was dated 28 January 13--.

== Marriage and issue ==
Arms of Bohun: Azure, a bend argent cotised or between six lions rampant of the last, as visible on the monumental brass of Sir Peter Courtenay (d.1405), KG, in Exeter Cathedral

On 11 August 1325, in accordance with a marriage settlement dated 27 September 1314, Courtenay married Margaret de Bohun (b. 3 April 1311 - d. 16 December 1391), eldest surviving daughter of Humphrey de Bohun, 4th Earl of Hereford (by his wife Princess Elizabeth, a daughter of King Edward I), by whom he had eight sons and nine daughters:

- Sir Hugh Courtenay (d.1348), KG, eldest son and heir apparent, who died shortly before Easter term, 1348, predeceasing his father. He married, before 3 September 1341, Elizabeth de Vere (d. 16 August 1375), a daughter of John de Vere, 7th Earl of Oxford by his wife Maud de Badlesmere (a daughter of Bartholomew de Badlesmere, 1st Baron Badlesmere), by whom he had an only son, Hugh Courtenay, 3rd Baron Courtenay, (d.20 February 1374) who died without issue. Elizabeth de Vere survived her husband and remarried successively to John de Mowbray, 3rd Baron Mowbray (d. 4 October 1361), and to Sir William de Cossington.
- Thomas Courtenay (born c.1329-31), a Canon of Crediton and Exeter.
- Sir Edward Courtenay (c.1331-1368/71) "of Godlington" (location uncertain), second son, who also predeceased his father. He married Emeline Dauney (c.1329 – 28 February 1371), daughter and heiress of Sir John Dauney/Dawnay/Dawney (d.1346/7) of Boconnoc and Sheviock in Cornwall, and of Townstal (including Norton Dauney within Townstal), East Allington, Stancombe Dawney (in the parish of Sherford, Devon), Buckland Brewer, South Allington, etc., in Devon, all of which manors descended into the Courtenay family, and of Mudford Terry in Somerset. He died between 2 February 1368 and 1 April 1371. He and his wife are supposedly represented by the surviving stone effigies in Sheviock Church in Cornwall. It is said by Cleaveland (1735) that Emmeline Dauney brought to her husband 16 manors. By his wife he had issue as follows:
  - Edward Courtenay, 3rd/11th Earl of Devon (d.1419), "The Blind Earl", who married Maud Camoys. The earldom remained in their descendants until their great-grandson, Thomas Courtenay, 6th/14th Earl of Devon, was beheaded at York on 3 April 1461 after the Battle of Towton, without issue. All his honours were forfeited by attainder, and the earldom eventually passed, after a brief period of confusion during the Wars of the Roses (for which see Earl of Devon), by a new creation in 1485 to Edward Courtenay, 1st Earl of Devon (d.1509), the grandson of Sir Hugh Courtenay (1358-1425) of Boconnoc in Cornwall and of Haccombe in Devon, younger brother of the 3rd/11th Earl.
  - Sir Hugh Courtenay (1358-1425) of Boconnoc in Cornwall and of Haccombe in Devon, whose grandson was Edward Courtenay, 1st Earl of Devon (d.1509).
- Robert Courtenay.
- William Courtenay (c.1342 – 31 July 1396), Archbishop of Canterbury.
- Sir Philip Courtenay (c.1345 – 29 July 1406) of Powderham in Devon, who married Ann Wake, a daughter of Sir Thomas Wake by his wife Alice Patteshull, a daughter of Sir John de Patteshull.
- Sir Peter Courtenay (d. 2 February 1405), KG, of Hardington Mandeville, Somerset, who married Margaret Clyvedon, widow of Sir John de Saint Loe (d. 8 November 1375), and daughter and heiress of John de Clyvedon. His monumental brass, much worn, but still showing the arms of Courtenay impaling Bohun, survives in the floor of the south aisle of Exeter Cathedral.
- Humphrey Courtenay, who died young without issue.
- Margaret Courtenay (the elder), (born c. 1328 - died 2 Aug 1395), who married John de Cobham, 3rd Baron Cobham.
- Elizabeth Courtenay (d. 7 August 1395), who married firstly, Sir John de Vere (d. before 23 June 1350) of Whitchurch, Buckinghamshire, eldest son and heir apparent of John de Vere, 7th Earl of Oxford, by his wife Maud de Badlesmere; and secondly to Sir Andrew Luttrell of Chilton, in Thorverton, Devon and had issue, including Sir Hugh Luttrell.
- Katherine Courtenay (d. 31 December 1399), who married, before 18 October 1353, Thomas Engaine, 2nd Baron Engaine (d. 29 June 1367), without progeny.
- Anne Courtenay.
- Joan Courtenay, who married, before 1367, Sir John de Cheverston (died c. 1375), by whom she had no issue.
- Margaret Courtenay (the younger), (born btw. 1342 and 1350 - died after July 1381), who married Sir Theobald Grenville II (died by July 1381).
- ______ Courtenay (7th daughter).
- ______ Courtenay (8th daughter).
- ______ Courtenay (9th daughter).

== Bibliography ==
- Browning, Charles H., Americans of Royal Descent, 6th ed. 1905, p. 105-108
- Beltz, George Frederick (1841). Memorials of the Order of the Garter. London: William Pickering. pp. 51–4.
- Cleaveland, E. (1735). A Genealogical History of the Noble and Illustrious Family of Courtenay. Exeter: Edward Farley.
- Cokayne, George Edward (1916). The Complete Peerage edited by Vicary Gibbs. Vol. IV. London: St Catherine Press.
- Holmes, G. Estates of Higher Nobility in Fourteenth Century England, Cambridge, 1957, p. 58
- Lodge, John, rev. by Mervyn Archdall (1789). The Peerage of Ireland. Vol. V. Dublin: James Moore.
- Mortimer, Ian Edward III (London 2007).
- Ormrod, W. M. The Reign of Edward III (Tempus Publishing 1999).
- Richardson, Douglas (2011). Everingham, Kimball G. (ed.). Magna Carta Ancestry: A Study in Colonial and Medieval Families. Vol. I (2nd ed.). Salt Lake City. ISBN 978-1449966379.
- Richardson, Douglas (2011). Everingham, Kimball G. (ed.). Magna Carta Ancestry: A Study in Colonial and Medieval Families. Vol. II (2nd ed.). Salt Lake City. ISBN 978-1449966386.
- Richardson, Douglas (2011). Everingham, Kimball G. (ed.). Magna Carta Ancestry: A Study in Colonial and Medieval Families. Vol. IV (2nd ed.). Salt Lake City. ISBN 978-1460992708.
- Saul, Nigel, ed. The Oxford History of Medieval England (OUP 1997).
- Register of Edward, the Black Prince, (ed) A. E. Stamp & M. C. B. Dawes (London 1930–33).
- Sumption, Jonathan, The Hundred Years' War, 2 vols, Vol.1: Trial by Battle, vol. 2: Trial by Fire (Faber 1999).
- Waugh, Scott L., England in the Reign of Edward III (CUP 1991)
- Tuck, Anthony, Crown and Nobility; England 1272-1461: political conflict in late medieval England, 2nd ed., (Blackwell 1999).

Peerage of England
Preceded by Hugh Courtenay	Earl of Devon; 1340–1377	Succeeded by Edward Courtenay
