= Elizabeth de Vere =

English noblewoman

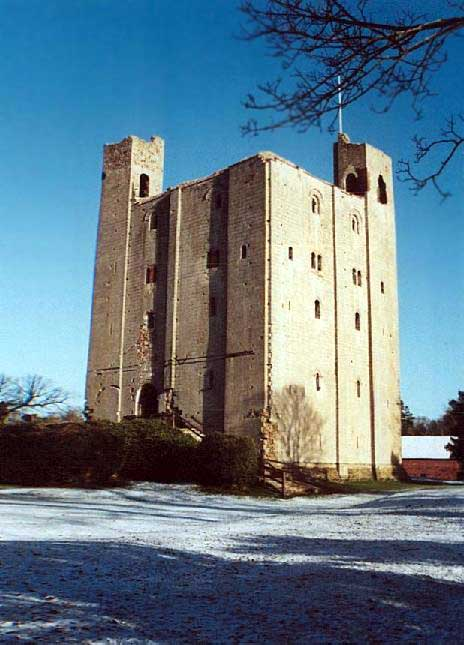
- Hedingham Castle, home of the Earls of Oxford
- Died: 14 or 16 August 1375
- Noble family: de Vere
- Spouses: Sir Hugh Courtenay; John de Mowbray, 3rd Baron Mowbray; Sir William de Cossington
- Issue: Hugh Courtenay (died 1374)
- Father: John de Vere, 7th Earl of Oxford
- Mother: Maud de Badlesmere

Elizabeth de Vere (died 14 or 16 August 1375) was the daughter of John de Vere, 7th Earl of Oxford and Maud de Badlesmere, and the wife of Sir Hugh Courtenay (died c. 1348), then John de Mowbray, 3rd Baron Mowbray, and then Sir William de Cossington.

Before 3 September 1341 she married Sir Hugh Courtenay (died c. 1348), the eldest son of Hugh Courtenay, 10th Earl of Devon (12 July 1303 – 2 May 1377), and Margaret de Bohun (d. 16 December 1391), daughter of Humphrey Bohun, Earl of Hereford and Essex (c.1276 – 16 March 1322), by Elizabeth (d. 5 May 1316), the daughter of King Edward I.

They had one son, Sir Hugh Courtenay, who died without issue on 20 February 1374.

Sir Hugh Courtenay died shortly after Easter term 1348, and was buried at Ford Abbey, Somerset. While on progress through Dorset, Queen Philippa is said to have 'placed a piece of cloth of gold as an oblation on his tomb' on 2 September 1349.

Elizabeth de Vere married, secondly, before 4 May 1351, the marriage later being validated by papal dispensation of that date, John de Mowbray, 3rd Baron Mowbray (d. 4 October 1361).

She married thirdly, before 18 January 1369, Sir William de Cossington, son and heir of Stephen de Cossington of Cossington in Aylesford, Kent. Not long after the marriage she and her new husband surrendered themselves to the Fleet prison for debt. According to Archer, the cause may have been her stepson, John de Mowbray, 4th Baron Mowbray's, prosecution of her for waste of his estates; he had been awarded damages against her of almost £1000.

She died 14 or 16 August 1375.
