= Baldwin de Redvers =

Baldwin de Redvers may refer to:

- Baldwin de Redvers, 1st Earl of Devon
- Baldwin de Redvers, 3rd Earl of Devon
- Baldwin de Redvers (died 1216)
- Baldwin de Redvers, 6th Earl of Devon
- Baldwin de Redvers, 7th Earl of Devon
