= Margaret de Bohun, Countess of Devon =

14th-century English noblewoman and bibliophile

Margaret de Bohun
- Countess of Devon
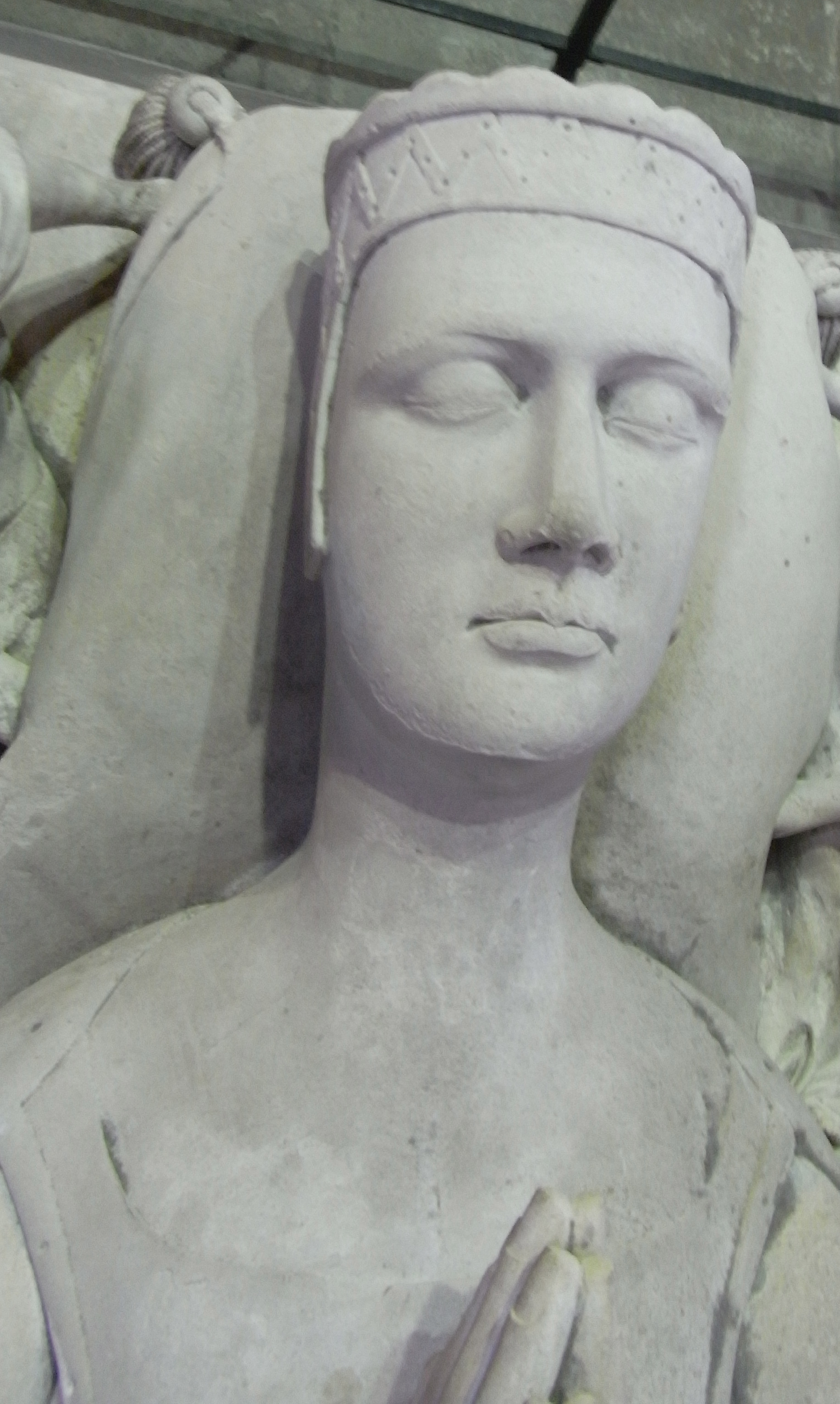
- Margaret de Bohun, detail of her effigy (heavily restored) (Note: Lysons described the effigies in 1822 as "much mutilated" (Magna Britannia, vol. 6, pp. 323–345))
- Born: 3 April 1311; Caldecote, Northamptonshire/Bedfordshire or Caldicot, Monmouthshire
- Died: 16 December 1391 (aged 80)
- Buried: Exeter Cathedral
- Noble family: Bohun
- Spouse: Hugh Courtenay, 10th Earl of Devon
- Issue: Sir Hugh Courtenay, KG; Thomas Courtenay; Sir Edward Courtenay; Robert Courtenay; William Courtenay, Archbishop of Canterbury; Sir Philip Courtenay; Sir Peter Courtenay, KG; Humphrey Courtenay; Margaret Courtenay (the elder); Elizabeth Courtenay; Katherine Courtenay; Anne Courtenay; Joan Courtenay; Margaret Courtenay (the younger) ______ Courtenay (7th daughter) ______ Courtenay (8th daughter) ______ Courtenay (9th daughter)
- Father: Humphrey de Bohun, 4th Earl of Hereford
- Mother: Elizabeth of Rhuddlan

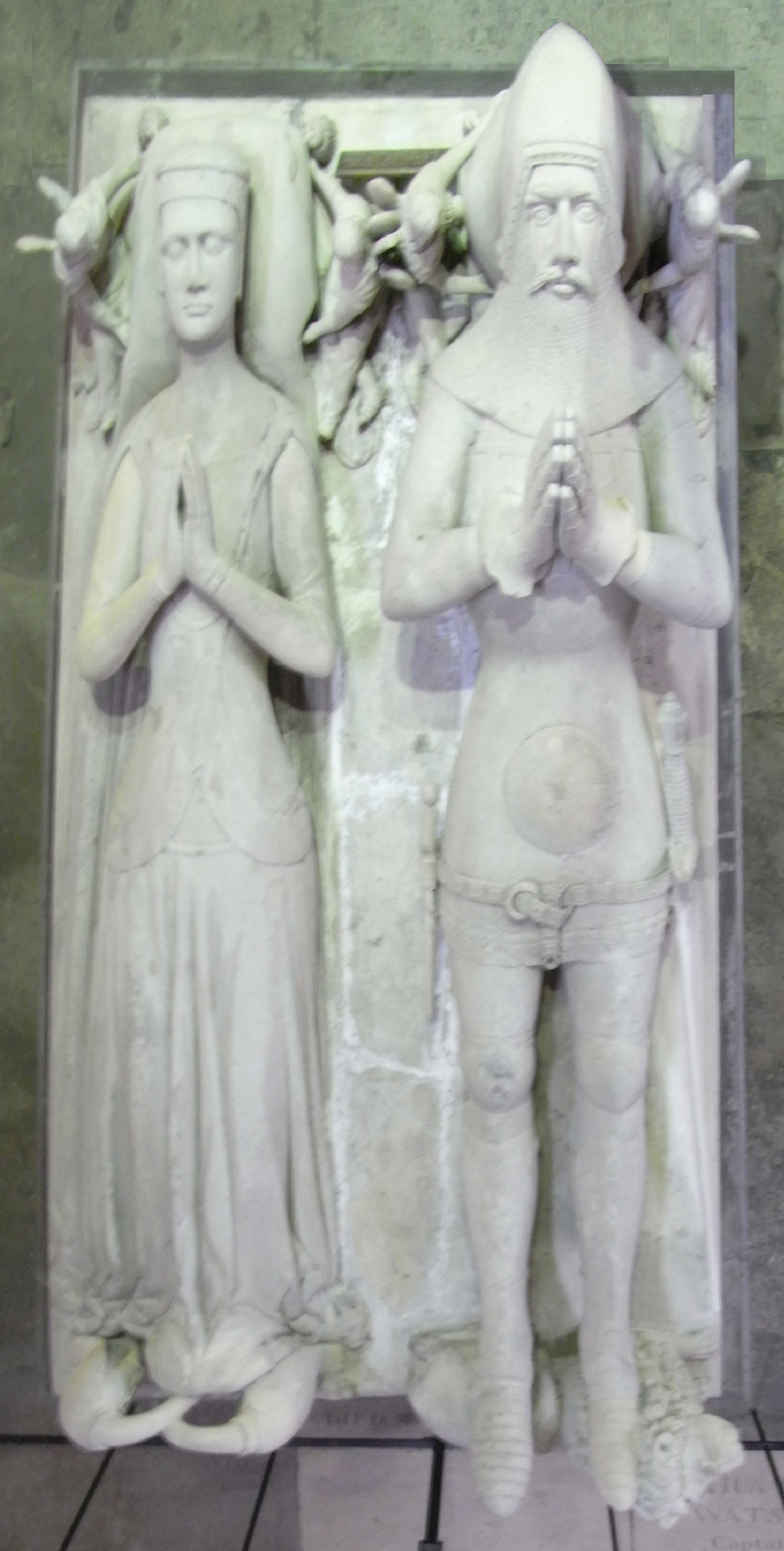
Effigies of Margaret de Bohun and her husband Hugh de Courtenay, 10th Earl of Devon, south transept, Exeter Cathedral. Two Bohun swans, the heraldic device of Bohun, are shown with their necks intertwined at Margaret's feet.

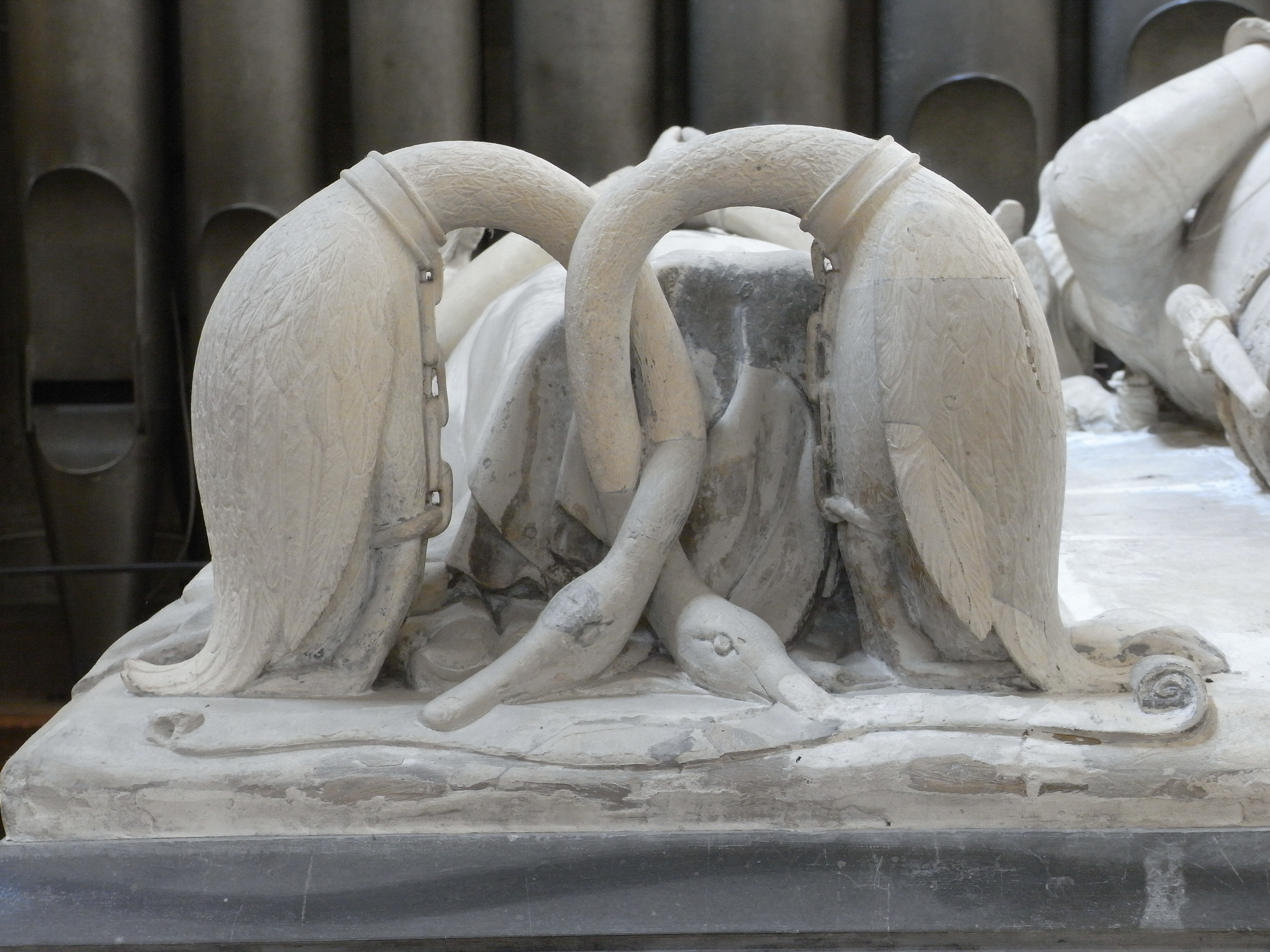
Bohun heraldic swans collared and chained with necks intertwined at feet of effigy of Margaret de Bohun. (Note: Heavily restored. Lysons described the swans in 1822 as "the remains of two birds" (Magna Britannia, vol. 6, pp. 323–345).) The Bohun swan can be seen above the escutcheon on her father's seal formerly attached to the Barons' Letter, 1301. A lion serves as the footrest of her husband.

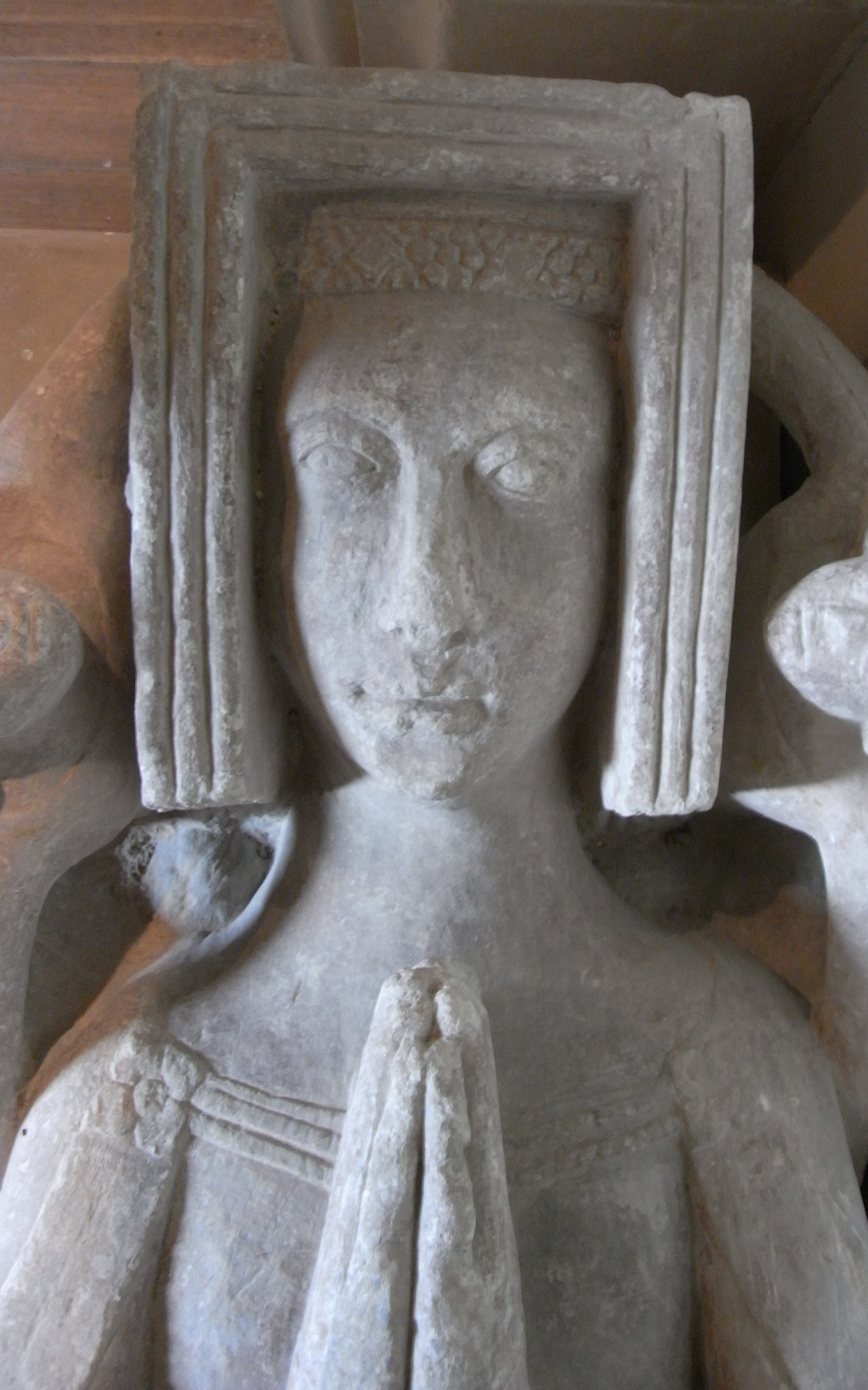
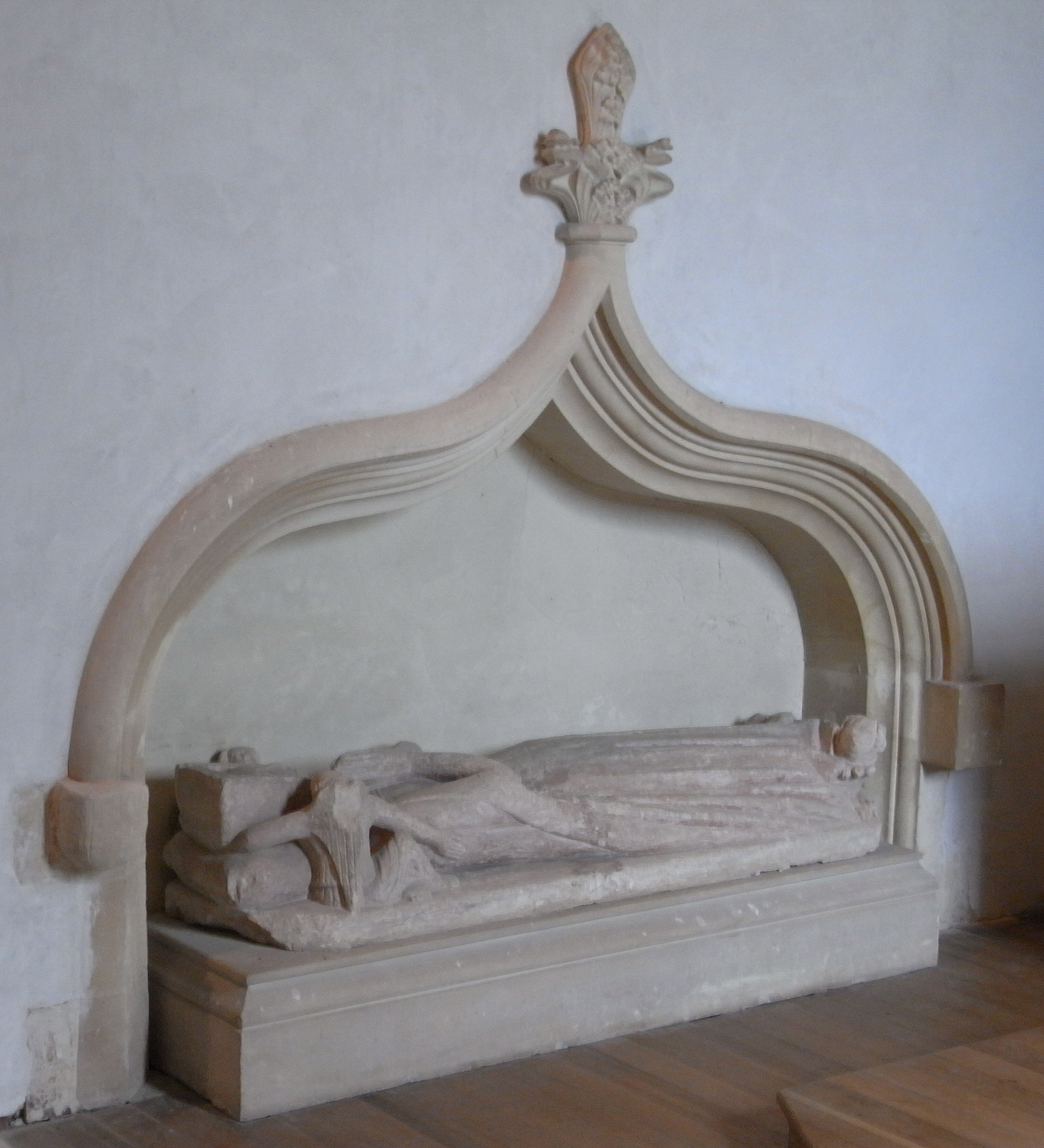
Effigy of unknown female, situated under recessed alcove, north wall of chancel, Powderham Church, Devon. Generally assumed to be of Elizabeth of Rhuddlan, (Note: Pevsner, N., Buildings of England: Devon, p.692, illustrates the typical confusion concerning this female effigy, whom he describes as: "Elizabeth de Bohun (d.1378?) [sic] whose daughter married the third [sic] Earl of Devon. Effigy with the queer headgear of that period". Clearly he is incorrect in two of his details, namely the date of her death, which he places 62 years too late, and the identity of her husband.) the youngest daughter of King Edward I and mother of Margaret de Bohun, wife of Hugh de Courtenay, 10th Earl of Devon. Samuel Lysons, writing in 1822, stated this effigy then to be situated 'in a window of the north aisle'.

Arms of Bohun: Azure, a bend argent cotised or between six lions rampant or. These arms can be seen (without tinctures) impaled by Courtenay on the monumental brass of Margaret's son Sir Peter Courtenay (d. 1405) in Exeter Cathedral.

Margaret de Bohun, Countess of Devon (3 April 1311 – 16 December 1391) was the daughter of Humphrey de Bohun, 4th Earl of Hereford, Lord High Constable of England and Elizabeth of Rhuddlan. She was the wife of Hugh Courtenay, 10th Earl of Devon (1303–1377). Of her 17 children, 11 made it to adulthood, including an Archbishop of Canterbury and six knights, of whom two were founder knights of the Order of the Garter. Unlike most women of her day, she received a classical education and was a lifelong scholar and collector of books.

== Early life ==
Lady Margaret de Bohun was born on 3 April 1311, the third daughter and seventh child of Humphrey de Bohun, 4th Earl of Hereford and Elizabeth of Rhuddlan, the youngest daughter of King Edward I and Eleanor of Castile. Her paternal grandparents were Humphrey de Bohun, 3rd Earl of Hereford and Maud de Fiennes. There has been a debate as to where she was born. Some sources say Caldecote, Northamptonshire or Caldecote, Bedfordshire; however, other sources state that it was in Caldicot, Monmouthshire, especially as it has a castle which has links to the de Bohun family.

On 16 March 1322 at the Battle of Boroughbridge, her father was slain in an ambush by the Welsh. Her mother had died six years previously in childbirth.

Together with her siblings she received a classical education under a Sicilian Greek, Master Diogenes. As a result, Margaret became a lifelong scholar and avid book collector.

On 11 August 1325, at the age of fourteen, Margaret married Hugh de Courtenay, the future 10th Earl of Devon, to whom she had been betrothed since 27 September 1314. Her dowry included the manor of Powderham near Exeter. The marriage agreement was formally made on 28 February 1315, when she was not quite four years old. (Note: This agreement, written in French, is from the Public Record Office, London DL27/13) The first earl of Devon promised that upon the marriage he would enfeoff his son and Margaret jointly with 400 marks' worth of land, assessed at its true value, and in a suitable place. Margaret assumed the title of Countess of Devon on 23 December 1340.

The family chantry was expanded at Naish Priory in the family's manor of Coker in Somerset, at the end of the 14th century when it was owned by her most notable son, William Courtenay, Archbishop of Canterbury.

Margaret died on 16 December 1391 at the age of eighty. She is buried in Exeter Cathedral.

== Marriage and issue ==
On 11 August 1325, in accordance with a marriage agreement dated 27 September 1314, she married Hugh Courtenay, 10th Earl of Devon (1303–1377), by whom she had eight sons and nine daughters: (Note: According to Cokayne, she had nine daughters.)

- Sir Hugh Courtenay (1326/7–1348), KG, eldest son and heir, who died shortly before Easter term, 1348, having predeceased his father. He married, before 3 September 1341, Elizabeth de Vere (d. 16 August 1375), daughter of John de Vere, 7th Earl of Oxford, and Maud de Badlesmere, daughter of Bartholomew de Badlesmere, 1st Baron Badlesmere.
- Thomas Courtenay (c. 1329/31 – 1381), canon of Crediton and Exeter and MP for Devon in 1377.
- Sir Edward Courtenay (c. 1331 – 1368/71), who was born about 1331 at Haccombe, Devon, and died between 2 February 1368 and 1 April 1371, having predeceased his father. He married Emeline Dawney (c. 1329 – 28 February 1371) in or before 1346, daughter and heiress of Sir John Dawney (d. 1346/47) of Mudford Terry, Somerset.
- Robert Courtenay.
- William Courtenay (c. 1342 – 31 July 1396), Archbishop of Canterbury.
- Sir Philip Courtenay (c. 1345 – 29 July 1406), of Powderham, who married Ann Wake, daughter of Sir Thomas Wake by Alice Patteshull, daughter of Sir John de Patteshull.
- Sir Peter Courtenay (d. 2 February 1405), KG, of Hardington Mandeville, Somerset, who married Margaret Clyvedon, widow of Sir John de Saint Loe (d. 8 November 1375), and daughter and heiress of John de Clyvedon.
- Humphrey Courtenay, who died young without issue.
- Margaret Courtenay (the elder) (born c. 1328 – died 2 Aug 1395), who married John de Cobham, 3rd Baron Cobham.
- Elizabeth Courtenay (d. 7 August 1395), who married, firstly, Sir John de Vere (d. before 23 June 1350) of Whitchurch, Buckinghamshire, eldest son and heir apparent of John de Vere, 7th Earl of Oxford, by Maud de Badlesmere, and, secondly, Sir Andrew Luttrell of Chilton, in Thorverton, Devon.
- Katherine Courtenay (d. 31 December 1399), who married, before 18 October 1353, Thomas Engaine, 2nd Baron Engaine (d. 29 June 1367), by whom she had no issue.
- Anne Courtenay.
- Joan Courtenay, who married, before 1367, Sir John de Cheverston (died c. 1375), by whom she had no issue.
- Margaret Courtenay (the younger) (1342x1350 – after July 1381), who married Sir Theobald Grenville II (died by July 1381).
- ______ Courtenay (7th daughter)
- ______ Courtenay (8th daughter)
- ______ Courtenay (9th daughter)

== Bibliography ==
- Cokayne, George Edward (1916). The Complete Peerage, edited by H.A. Doubleday. Vol. IV. London: St. Catherine Press.
- Lodge, John; Archdall, Mervyn (1789). The Peerage of Ireland: Or, A Genealogical History of the Present Nobility of that Kingdom. Ireland: J. Moore.
- Richardson, Douglas (2011). Everingham, Kimball G. (ed.). Magna Carta Ancestry: A Study in Colonial and Medieval Families. Vol. I (2nd ed.). Salt Lake City. ISBN 9781461045205.
- Richardson, Douglas (2011). Everingham, Kimball G. (ed.). Magna Carta Ancestry: A Study in Colonial and Medieval Families. Vol. II (2nd ed.). Salt Lake City. ISBN 9781449966386.
- Richardson, Douglas (2011). Everingham, Kimball G. (ed.). Magna Carta Ancestry: A Study in Colonial and Medieval Families. Vol. IV (2nd ed.). Salt Lake City. ISBN 9781460992708.
- Risdon, Tristram, The Chorographical Description or Survey of the County of Devon, pp. 357–360, Google Books, retrieved on 4 November 2009
- Ward, Jennifer C., ed. (2013). Women of the English Nobility and Gentry, 1066-1500. Manchester University Press. ISBN 9781526112897.
