= Hugh Courtenay (died 1348) =

Sir Hugh Courtenay KG
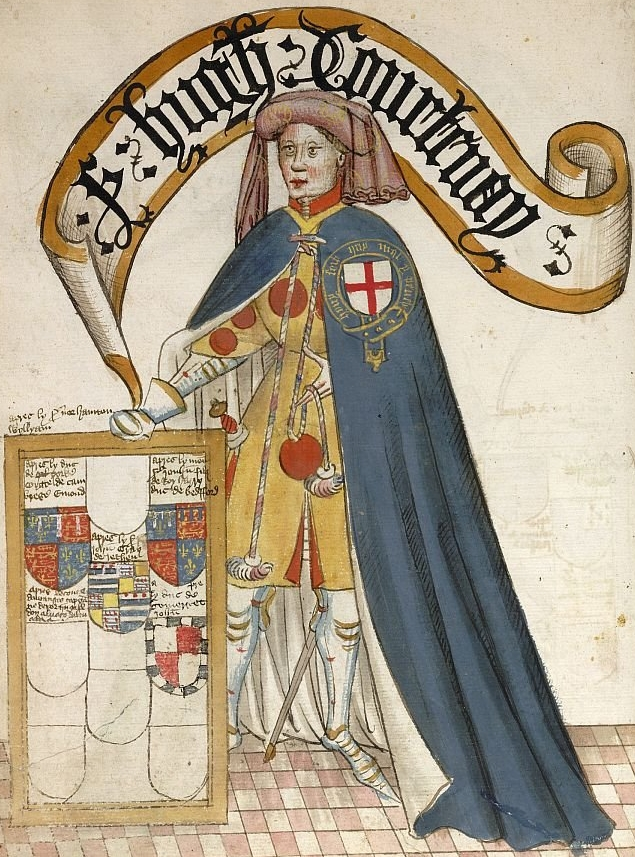
- Hugh Courtenay from the Bruges Garter Book, 1430/1440, BL Stowe 594. The Courtenay arms are displayed on his tabard under his Garter robe
- Born: 22 March 1327
- Died: after Easter term 1348
- Noble family: Courtenay
- Spouse: Elizabeth de Vere
- Issue: Hugh Courtenay (died 1374)
- Father: Hugh Courtenay, 10th Earl of Devon
- Mother: Margaret de Bohun

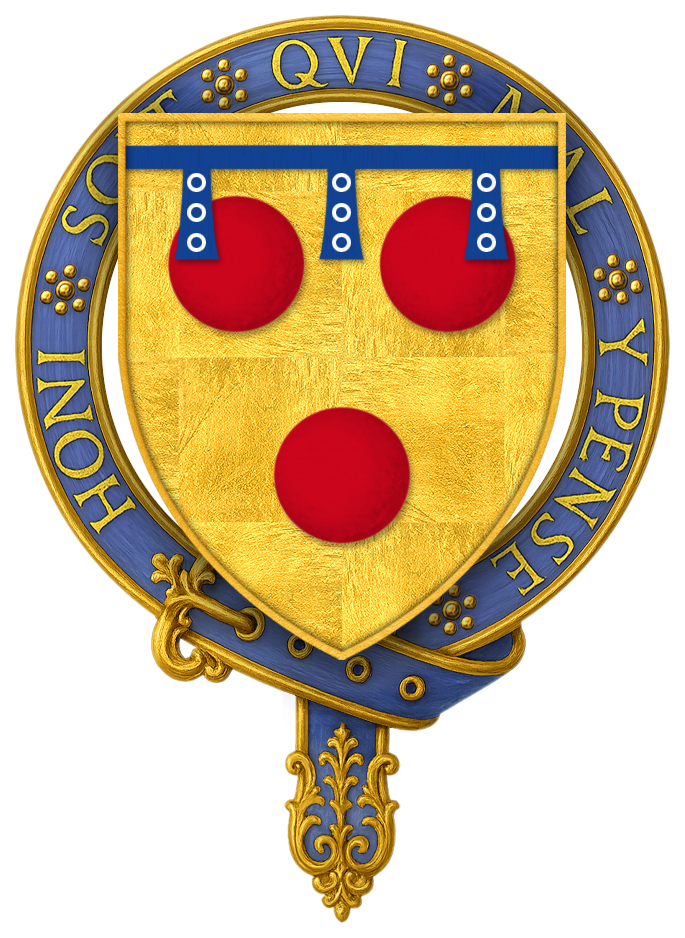
Arms of Sir Hugh de Courtenay (d. circa 1348), KG: Or, three torteaux gules a label of three points azure each point charged with three annulets argent

Sir Hugh Courtenay, KG (22 March 1327 – after Easter term 1348) was the eldest son and heir apparent of Hugh Courtenay, 10th Earl of Devon (1303–1377), whom he predeceased, and was a founding member of the Order of the Garter.

== Career ==
Sir Hugh Courtenay was born 22 March 1327, the eldest son of Hugh Courtenay, 10th Earl of Devon (12 July 1303 – 2 May 1377) by his wife Margaret de Bohun (d. 16 December 1391), daughter of Humphrey Bohun, Earl of Hereford and Essex (c.1276 – 16 March 1322), by Elizabeth (d. 5 May 1316), the daughter of King Edward I.

== Knight of the Garter ==
Although Vivian (1895) and Richardson (2011) and others suggest that the Sir "Hugh Courtenay" who was one of the founding members of the Order of the Garter was Hugh Courtenay, 10th Earl of Devon (1303–1377), Complete Peerage, follows Beltz, who correctly states that the founding member was the 10th Earl's eldest son and heir apparent, Sir Hugh Courtenay (died 1349), the subject of this article, citing the latter's service in France in 1346, his presence at the siege of Calais in 1347 in the company of his uncle, William de Bohun, 1st Earl of Northampton (died 1360), and his prowess at a tournament at Eltham Palace later that year in which he received from the King, 'as his guerdon, a hood of white cloth, buttoned with large pearls, and embroidered with figures of men in dancing postures'. Beltz also notes more pertinently that William de Bohun, 1st Earl of Northampton (c. 1310 – 1360) succeeded to Sir Hugh Courtenay's stall at Windsor, and since Northampton died in 1360, while Hugh Courtenay, 10th Earl of Devon, lived until 1377, Northampton could not have been successor to the 10th Earl of Devon in the Order of the Garter, and must therefore have been successor to Sir Hugh Courtenay, the 10th Earl of Devon's son, who died in 1348.

== Marriage and children ==
Before 3 September 1341, Courtenay married a certain "Elizabeth", said to have been Elizabeth de Bryan, daughter of Sir Guy de Bryan of Tor Bryan, Devon, (possibly through confusion with his son's wife) or possibly Elizabeth de Vere (died 1375), daughter of John de Vere, 7th Earl of Oxford by his wife Maud de Badlesmere. Elizabeth survived her first husband and married secondly, before 4 May 1351, John de Mowbray, 3rd Baron Mowbray (d. 4 October 1361), which marriage was later validated by papal dispensation of that date. She married (3rd) before 18 January 1369 Sir William de Cossington. Elizabeth died 16 August 1375. Courtenay had children by Elizabeth including:

- Hugh Courtenay, 3rd Baron Courtenay, who married firstly, Margaret de Bryan, daughter of Guy de Bryan, and secondly, Maud de Holand, daughter of Thomas Holland, 1st Earl of Kent, and his wife, Joan, but died without issue on 20 February 1374.

== Death and burial ==
Sir Hugh Courtenay died shortly after Easter term 1348, aged 21, and was buried at Forde Abbey, Dorset. While on progress through Dorset, Queen Philippa is said to have placed a piece of cloth of gold as an oblation on his tomb on 2 September 1349. The cause of his death is unknown. But it is perhaps no coincidence that Courtenay's last resting place is only 55 kilometres north-west of Melcombe, the port where the Black Death first entered England in 1348. Had he died in battle or during a tournament, it is likely that his passing would have been recorded since he was the first of the original Garter knights to perish.

== Sources ==
- Beltz, George Frederick (1841). Memorials of the Order of the Garter. London: William Pickering. pp. 51–4.
- Cokayne, George Edward (1916). The Complete Peerage. Vol. IV. London: St. Catherine Press.
- Richardson, Douglas (2011). Magna Carta Ancestry: A Study in Colonial and Medieval Families, ed. Kimball G. Everingham. Vol. I (2nd ed.). Salt Lake City.
- Shaw, Wm. A. (1971). The Knights of England: A Complete Record from the Earliest Time to the Present Day of the Knights of All the Orders of Chivalry in England, Scotland, and Ireland, and of the Knights Bachelors. Baltimore: Genealogical Publishing Company. OCLC 247620448.
