= Hugh Courtenay (died 1425) =

English knight (after 1358–1425)

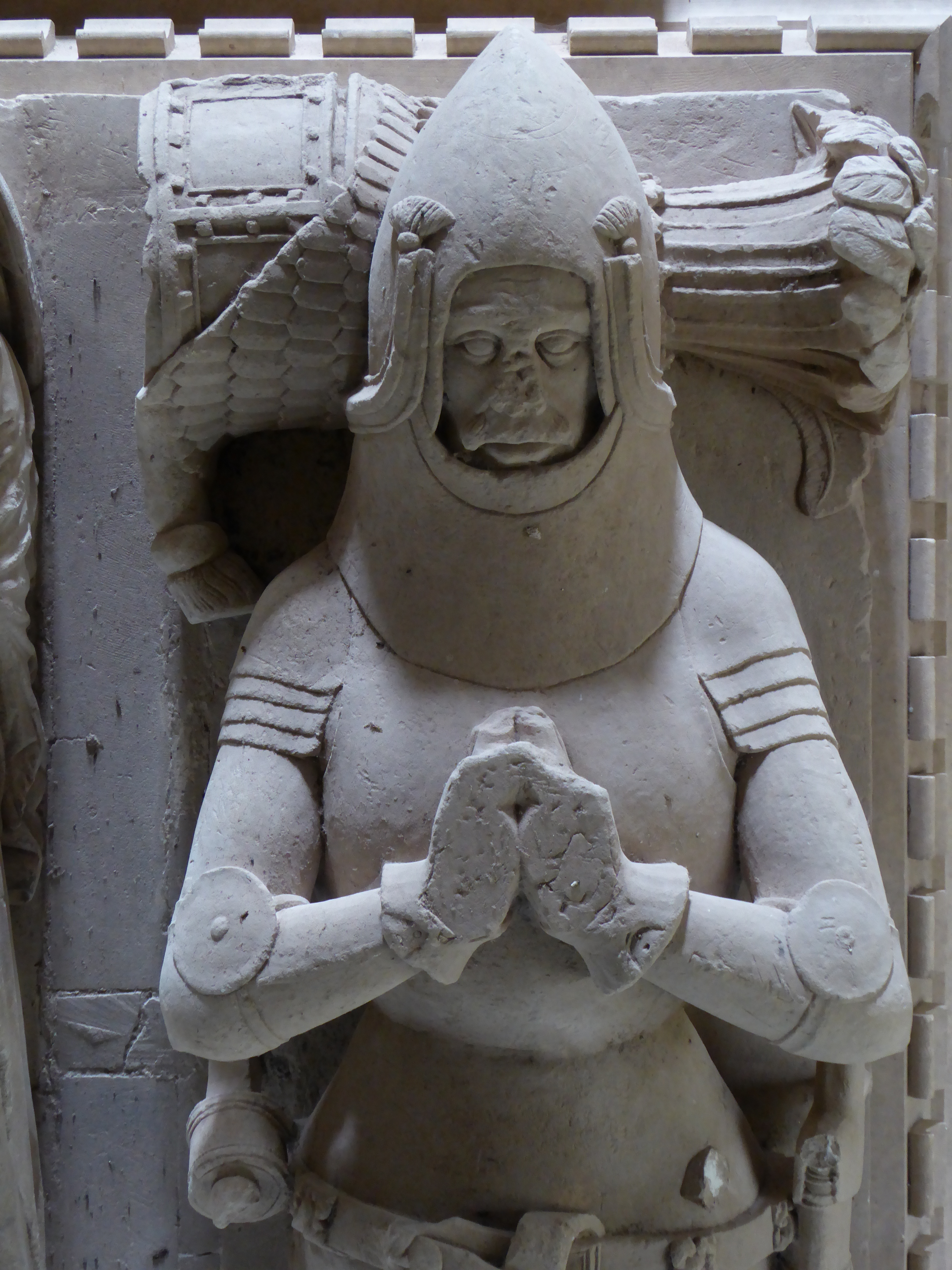
Sir Hugh Courtenay (died 1425), detail from his effigy in Haccombe Church. Dressed as a knight in full armour, his head rests on a helm on top of which is the Courtenay crest: A panache of ostrich feathers

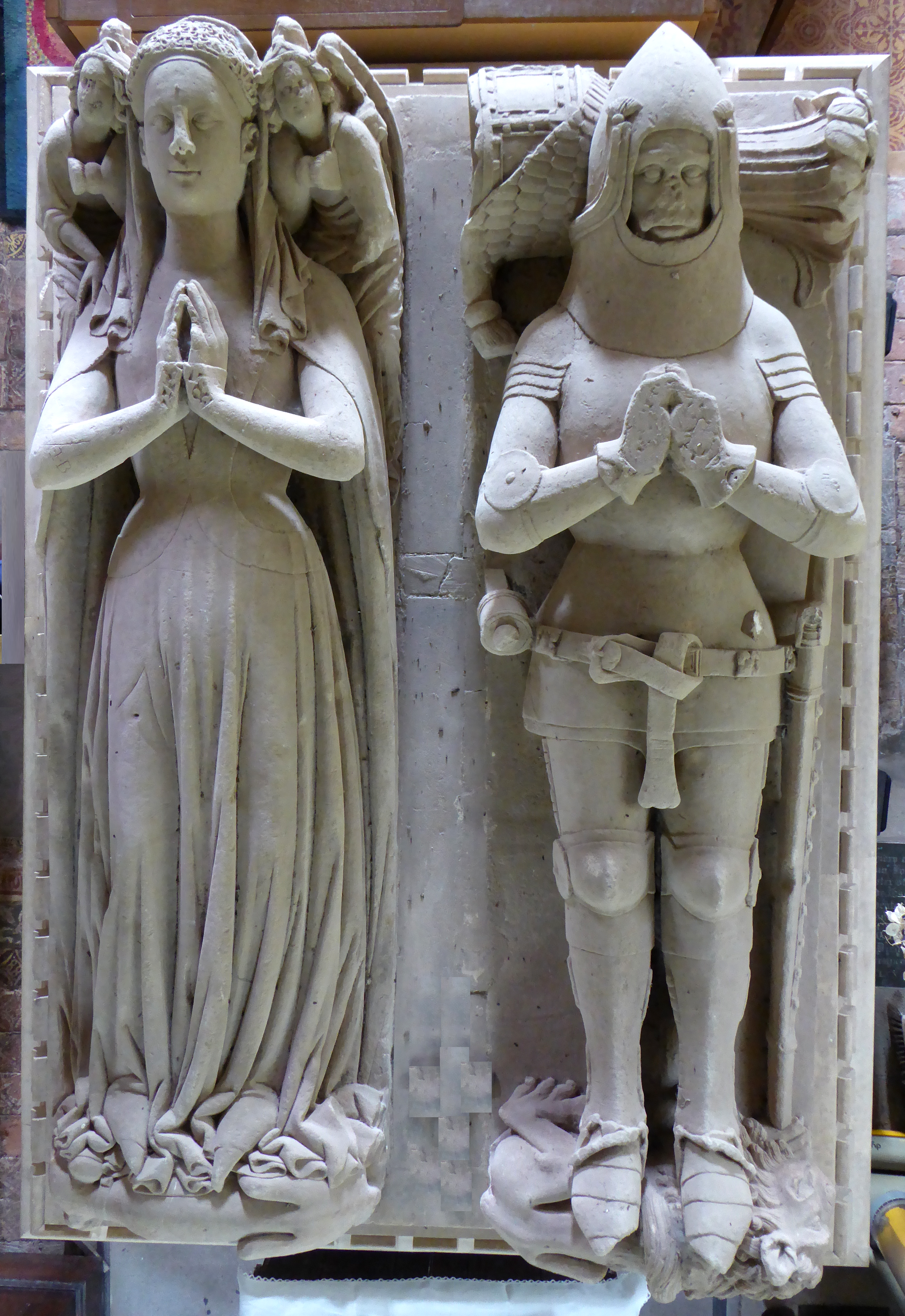
Sir Hugh Courtenay (d.1425) and his wife Philipa Archdekne, heiress of Haccombe, monument in Haccombe Church

Arms of first Courtenay Earls of Devon: Or, three torteaux a label azure, the earliest surviving depiction of which (without tinctures), impaling Bohun, is visible on the monumental brass in Exeter Cathedral, Devon, of Sir Peter Courtenay (died 1405), 5th son of Hugh Courtenay, 2nd Earl of Devon (died 1377) and uncle of Sir Hugh Courtenay (d.1425) of Haccombe

Diagram showing the descent of the Courtenay Earls of Devon during the Wars of the Roses. Sir Hugh I Courtenay (d.1425) of Boconnoc was the link between the senior line made extinct following the Battle of Tewkesbury in 1471 and the post-War creation of a new Earldom in 1485 by King Henry VII

Sir Hugh I Courtenay (after 1358 – 5 or 6 March 1425), of Haccombe in Devon, was Sheriff of Devon for 1418/19 and was thrice elected knight of the shire for Devon in 1395, 1397 and 1421. He was a grandson of Hugh de Courtenay, 2nd/10th Earl of Devon (1303–1377), was the younger brother of Edward de Courtenay, 3rd/11th Earl of Devon (1357–1419), "The Blind Earl", and was the grandfather of Edward Courtenay, 1st Earl of Devon (d.1509), KG, created Earl of Devon in 1485 by King Henry VII. He was the link between the senior line of the Courtenay Earls of Devon made extinct following the Battle of Tewkesbury in 1471 (his elder brother's line) and the post-Wars of the Roses creation of a new Earldom for his grandson made in 1485 by King Henry VII.

== Origins ==
Hugh Courtenay was born in 1358, the younger of two sons of Sir Edward de Courtenay (d. between 2 February 1368 –1 April 1371) of Goodrington, Devon, by his wife Emeline (or Emme) Dawney (or Dauney, Daunay, etc.) (c.1329 – 28 February 1371/2), daughter and heiress of Sir John Dawnay (d.1346/7) of Sheviock in Cornwall, Mudford Terry and Hinton in Somerset by his wife Sybil Treverbyn. Emmeline Dauney was a great heiress who brought to her husband several manors and estates Hugh Courtenay was the grandson of Hugh de Courtenay, 2nd/10th Earl of Devon (1303–1377). At the 2nd/10th Earl's death on 2 May 1377, Courtenay's elder brother, Edward, became the 3rd/11th Earl of Devon.

== Maternal inheritance ==
His elder brother was due to inherit the earldom and the vast Courtenay estates under primogeniture or entail, and thus as the second son with no prospective patrimony, Hugh Courtenay was given various estates by his mother, the heiress Emmeline Dauney. The practice of raising up a younger son in this way was common in the case of a wealthy heiress who married an already wealthy husband, and frequently the younger son beneficiary was required to adopt the maternal surname and armorials. Furthermore, his mother requested his elder brother the Earl to give him the estates of "Goderington" (Goodrington), Stancombe (alias Slancomb (sic) Dawney) and South Allington, which he duly performed by deed of indenture dated 1414.

== Career ==
Courtenay's elder brother, Edward Courtenay, 11th Earl of Devon (c.1357 – 5 December 1419), succeeded to the earldom of Devon in 1377, and by 1384 Hugh was serving as one of his brother's esquires. Earlier, in 1378 Courtenay had taken part with his uncles, Sir Philip Courtenay and Sir Peter Courtenay, in an unsuccessful naval expedition against Spain at which Courtenay was captured, but quickly ransomed. He had been knighted by 1387, and in March of that year served at sea in his brother's retinue under the Lord Admiral, the Earl of Arundel.

Little else is known of his career until he went to Ireland with King Richard II's expedition in April 1399, serving under the Duke of Aumale, who had earlier been granted custody of the lands of Courtenay's stepson, Fulk FitzWarin.

Over the years Courtenay acquired considerable property, much of it by way of his marriages. At his death he held 14 manors, principally in the West Country, but also in Essex and Herefordshire.

Courtenay served on commissions during the reigns of both Richard II and his successor, Henry IV, including commissions concerned with inquiry into the possessions of Richard II's former supporters, suggesting that he accommodated himself to both regimes.

He was made Commissioner of Survey to Devon and Cornwall in 1388, and again by Lords Appellant to the two counties in October 1397. In 1395 he was elected as MP for Devon and again in September 1397. At the height of the Crisis, King Richard II betrayed his uncle, Earl of Arundel, and as a consequence he lost his main supporters.

After the usurpation by King Henry IV Hugh was made Commissioner of Array for Devon in December 1399 - responsible for raising troops and bringing the south-west to the Lancastrian cause. He proved a successful recruiter for the wars in France, as he was made commissioner again in July 1402 to fight the Welsh Rebellion. The commission met again in August, September, and October 1403, after King Henry had defeated Harry Hotspur and the Mortimers at Shrewsbury.

In February 1400, Sir Hugh was a Commissioner of oyer and terminer dispensing the king's justice in the south-west. There was also a Commission of Inquiry into waste lands. King Henry made Hugh a Commissioner in the region and in Hampshire, a traditional land area of Courtenay holdings, to look into the concealment of possessions owned by adherents of the late king. He was also on the commission for "concealment of alnage" in Devon from July 1401.

The south-western counties disliked the new king and interference of parliament and in 1405 the Cornish rebelled with widespread rioting. In January a commission was set up to look into "unlawful assemblies" during 1406. Sir Hugh, however was a known Lancastrian: in May 1402 he had been forced to proclaim the intention of Henry IV to govern well. Also he was a JP for Devon, appointed on 16 February 1400 for the period until 1407; instructed to enforce the law and collect the king's taxes. He was appointed Tax Collector for Devon in March 1404.

He was made High Sheriff of Devon on 4 November 1418, holding the office for the year until 23 November 1419. When his brother the Earl of Devon died the new earl was fighting the French abroad, and so Sir Hugh was the most senior member of the family at home and probably felt compelled to represent Devon in parliament again in May 1421.

Henry IV died in 1413, and during the new reign Sir Hugh found favour with Henry V. King Henry V had travelled triumphantly through France, securing the future accession of his son as King of both England and France. Sir Hugh was thus present as knight of the shire for the County of Devon.

Hugh's brother, the 11th Earl, died in 1419, and was succeeded by his son, Hugh Courtenay, 12th Earl of Devon (1389 — 16 June 1422). The 12th Earl spent considerable time abroad in service to the crown, leaving Hugh as the senior member of the family in England. After the death of his nephew in 1422, Courtenay was again the senior member of the family during the minority of Thomas Courtenay, 13th Earl of Devon.

Courtenay died on 5 or 6 March 1425, leaving two daughters, Joan and Eleanor, by his third wife Philippa, and two sons and a daughter by his fourth wife, Maud. The lands which had belonged to Philippa were divided between their two daughters, Joan and Eleanor. Courtenay's heir was his elder son, Edward, who was eight years of age at his father's death. Courtenay's younger son, Hugh (d.1471) of Boconnoc in Cornwall (inherited on his marriage to Margaret Carminowe), was the father of Edward Courtenay, 1st Earl of Devon of the 1485 creation.

Courtenay was buried at Haccombe beside his third wife, Philippa.

== Marriages and issue ==
Sir Hugh Courtenay married four times:

- Firstly to Elizabeth FitzPayn (d. by 1392), widow of Sir Thomas de Audley (d. pre-1386), slain in France in the Hundred Years' War, and daughter of Sir Robert FitzPayn by his wife Elizabeth Bryan, daughter of Guy de Bryan, Lord Bryan. Without issue.
- Secondly, before 11 February 1393, to Elizabeth Cogan (d. 29 October 1397), widow of Sir Fulk FitzWarin (d.1391), 5th Baron FitzWarin and daughter of Sir William Cogan Feudal baron of Bampton in Devon, by his wife Isabel Loring, the daughter of Sir Nigel Loring. Without surviving issue.
- Thirdly, before 1407, to Philippa Archdekne (alias Ercedecne), a daughter and co-heiress of Sir Warin Archdekne (1354-1400), MP, of Haccombe in Devon, by his wife Elizabeth Talbot, a "co-heiress" of Sir John Talbot. By Philippa he had one son who pre-deceased his father and two daughters, co-heiresses of their mother;
  - Edward Courtenay, only son and heir apparent who predeceased his father aged 16, believed to be represented by the very fine miniature alabaster effigy in Haccombe Church, next to the large monument to his parents. Two angels support his pillow and a dog is at his feet. Had he lived he would have been not only lord of the manor of Haccombe, but also Earl of Devon, and would have prevented the Carews from inheriting Haccombe.
  - Elizabeth (or Alianore) Courtenay (born c.1413), who died unmarried;
  - Joan Courtenay (born 1411/14 – d. before 3 August 1465), who eventually became her mother's sole heiress. She married twice, firstly to Sir Nicholas Carew (d. before 20 April 1448), Baron Carew, of Mohuns Ottery in Devon, of Carew Castle in Pembrokeshire and of Moulesford in Berkshire, by whom she had five sons and three daughters. She was the heiress of 16 manors, which she divided amongst her younger sons. She gave Haccombe to her second son Nicholas Carew, founder of the Carew family of Haccombe (see Carew baronets (1661) of Haccombe). Secondly, by royal licence dated 5 October 1450, she married Sir Robert Vere, second son of Richard de Vere, 11th Earl of Oxford, by whom she had a son, John Vere, father of John de Vere, 15th Earl of Oxford.
- Fourthly, by royal licence dated 16 October 1417, to Maud Beaumont (d. 3 July 1467), daughter of Sir William Beaumont of Shirwell by his wife Isabel Willington, daughter of Sir Henry Willington of Umberleigh in Devon. They had two sons as follows:
  - Sir Edward Courtenay (b.1417), eldest son, who died without progeny
  - Sir Hugh II Courtenay (c.1427 – 6 May 1471) of Boconnoc, twice MP for Cornwall in 1446 and 1449, who married Margaret Carminow, widow firstly of Sir John de Saint Looe and secondly of William Bottreaux, and daughter and co-heiress of Thomas Carminow of Boconnoc by his wife Joan Hill, the daughter of Robert Hill. He was beheaded after the Battle of Tewkesbury (1471), having fought for the defeated House of Lancaster. His eldest son was Edward Courtenay, 1st Earl of Devon (d.1509), KG, created Earl of Devon in 1485 by King Henry VII, following the ending of the Wars of the Roses.

== Notes ==
- In his books titled Magna Carta Ancestry (2011) and Plantagenet Ancestry (2011), Douglas Richardson erroneously identifies Margaret Courtenay, wife of Sir Theobald Grenville II, as the daughter of Sir Hugh Courtenay of Haccombe (died 5/6 March 1425) and his 4th wife, Maud Beaumont. This is chronologically impossible as Margaret Courtenay would have been born after 16 Oct. 1417 and her husband, Sir Theobald Grenville II, died by July 1381. [see Roskell, J.S. The History of Parliament: The House of Commons 1386–1421. Vol. 2. (1992): (biog. of Sir John Grenville (d. 1412), of Stow in Kilkhampton, Cornw. and Bideford, Devon): "s. and h. of Sir Theobald Grenville of Stow and Bideford by Margaret, da. of Hugh Courtenay, earl of Devon, and Margaret de Bohun, gdda. of Edw. I. m. bef. Sept. 1391, Margaret (c.1376-c.1421), er. da. and coh. of Sir John Burghersh of Ewelme, Oxon. 1da. d.v.p. suc. fa. by July 1381.”] [Sir John Grenville succeeded his father (Sir Theobald Grenville II) upon his death in July 1381. Margaret Courtenay, wife of Sir Theobald Grenville II, could not have been the daughter of Sir Hugh Courteany of Haccombe and his 4th wife, Maud Beaumont, as she would have been born some 37 years after her husband's death in July 1381.].

== Bibliography ==
- Cherry, Martin (1981). "'The Crown and the Political Community in Devonshire, 1377-1461'". Unpublished PhD Thesis, University of Wales. Swansea.
- Cherry, Martin (1986). "The Disintegration of a Dominant Medieval Affinity: the Courtenay family". Southern History.
- Cokayne, George Edward (1916). The Complete Peerage, edited by Vicary Gibbs. Vol. IV. London: St. Catherine Press.
- Richardson, Douglas (2011). Magna Carta Ancestry: A Study in Colonial and Medieval Families, ed. Kimball G. Everingham. Vol. I (2nd ed.). Salt Lake City. ISBN 1449966373
- Richardson, Douglas (2011). Magna Carta Ancestry: A Study in Colonial and Medieval Families, ed. Kimball G. Everingham. Vol. II (2nd ed.). Salt Lake City. ISBN 1449966381

Parliament of England
Preceded by Sir John Grenville; Sir James Chudleigh	Member of Parliament for Devon; 1395; With: Sir Philip Courtenay	Succeeded by Sir William Bonville; Sir John Grenville
Preceded by Sir William Bonville; Sir John Grenville	Member of Parliament for Devon; 1397; With: Sir William Bonville	Succeeded by Sir Philip Courtenay; John Stretch
Preceded by Sir Robert Chalons; Thomas Archdeacon	Member of Parliament for Devon; 1421; With: Robert Cary	Succeeded by John Copplestone; Henry Fortescue
Political offices
Preceded by Stephen Derneford	High Sheriff of Devon; 1418–1419	Succeeded by Thomas Beaumont
