= Robert Chalons =

Member of the Parliament of England

Sir Robert Chalons (c. 1370–1445) was an English courtier, soldier, administrator and politician from Devon.

== Origins ==
Born about 1370, he was the son of Sir Robert Chalons, of Challonsleigh in Plympton St Mary, and his wife Joan, elder daughter and coheiress of Sir John Beauchamp, of Ryme, and his wife Margaret, daughter of Sir John Whalesborough and his wife Joan Bodrugan. His father was a minor landowner in Devon who served Edward Courtenay, 3rd Earl of Devon.

== Career ==
Initially he joined his father as an esquire of the Earl of Devon in 1384, and, in 1387, was serving at sea in the fleet of Richard FitzAlan, 11th Earl of Arundel. Later that year he entered the service of Henry of Bolingbroke, Earl of Derby, and in 1390 went on his expedition to Prussia, fighting with the Teutonic Knights at Vilnius against the forces of the Grand Duke of Lithuania. Once back in England he married Blanche Waterton, daughter and coheiress of one of Henry's close associates, and in 1399 Henry, the day before the coronation, knighted him. The next year he was appointed a justice of the peace for Devon.

In 1401 he was sent abroad on royal business and by 1402 was a Knight of the King's Chamber. In 1409 he served as High Sheriff of Devon. In 1415, with a small force, he joined the expedition of King Henry V to France and after its capture was part of the garrison of Harfleur.

In 1420, he was elected member of the Parliament of England for Devon and for another term as Sheriff. He was again in Normandy, with the King, in 1421. After the King's death in 1422 he seems to have retired from royal service, being involved only in local government in Devon.

His wife died in 1437 and he died on 6 February 1445, having outlived his sons. His heir was his grandson John, who died without children two years later. Monuments to both were in the Greyfriars church in London. His lands were then divided between the two children of his daughter Catherine.

== Landholdings ==
From his father he inherited small properties in Devon, including Challonsleigh and the manors of Buckerell and Awliscombe, which yielded only about 5 pounds a year.

On his marriage, Duke Henry awarded the couple an income of 20 marks (over 13 pounds) from the manor of Brecon. Once king, in 1399 Henry granted him the forfeited estates of Sir John Cary and of Sir Thomas Shelley. The Cary holdings included the castle and manor of Great Torrington, four and a half other manors and over 1,000 acres (400 hectares) of land in Devon, Cornwall and Somerset, together producing about 230 pounds a year. These were however gradually lost to legal and illegal challenges by Sir Robert Cary and associates so that by 1445 he held none. The Shelley properties in Middlesex he seems to have kept for some years.

He also enjoyed grants by King Henry IV's nephew, John Holland, 2nd Duke of Exeter, who in 1420 gave him and his wife and their male heirs the manor of Flete Damarell in Holbeton, which in 1447 reverted to the Hollands.

After the death of his father-in-law in 1409, he and his wife received 400 marks (267 pounds) as their share of his wealth, together with a part of the manor of Eaton Tregoes in Foy, Herefordshire. In Wiltshire he had an income from Upavon worth 60 pounds a year and property at Fonthill Gifford.

== Family ==
Around 1393, he married Blanche, daughter and later coheiress of Sir Hugh Waterton and his first wife Ellen, daughter of a Lincolnshire landowner Robert Mowbray. A trusted member of the royal household, her father at the time was chamberlain to King Henry IV and her stepmother acted as guardian to the king's daughter Philippa.

Blanche herself was granted an income by the crown in 1407, with an addition for life in 1410 after the death of her father. Their children were:

Thomas, whose history is unknown.
Henry, who is said to have married Margaret Clifton, and was survived by a son John, who died childless in 1447.
Elizabeth, who after 1412 married John Ferrers, of Churston Ferrers, but seems to have had no children.
Catherine (died 1420), who married John St Aubyn (died 1418), of Combe Raleigh. They left two daughters, who became heiresses to the Chalons lands on the death of their cousin John in 1447:

Joan, who married first Otto Bodrugan, son of William II Bodrugan, and secondly William Dennis, with him having a daughter Alice who married John Bonville (died 1491).
Margaret (born 1415), who married Reginald Tretherf, of Trethurffe in Ladock, and had a son John who married Elizabeth Courtenay, sister of Edward Courtenay, 1st Earl of Devon.

Parliament of England
Preceded by Edward Pomeroy; Robert Cary	Member of Parliament for Devon; 1420; With: Thomas Archdeacon	Succeeded by Sir Hugh Courtenay; Robert Cary
Political offices
Preceded by Sir William Cheney	High Sheriff of Devon; 1409–1410	Succeeded by Sir Thomas Pomeroy
Preceded by Thomas Beaumont	High Sheriff of Devon; 1420–1422	Succeeded by Thomas Beaumont
