= John Upton (died 1641) =

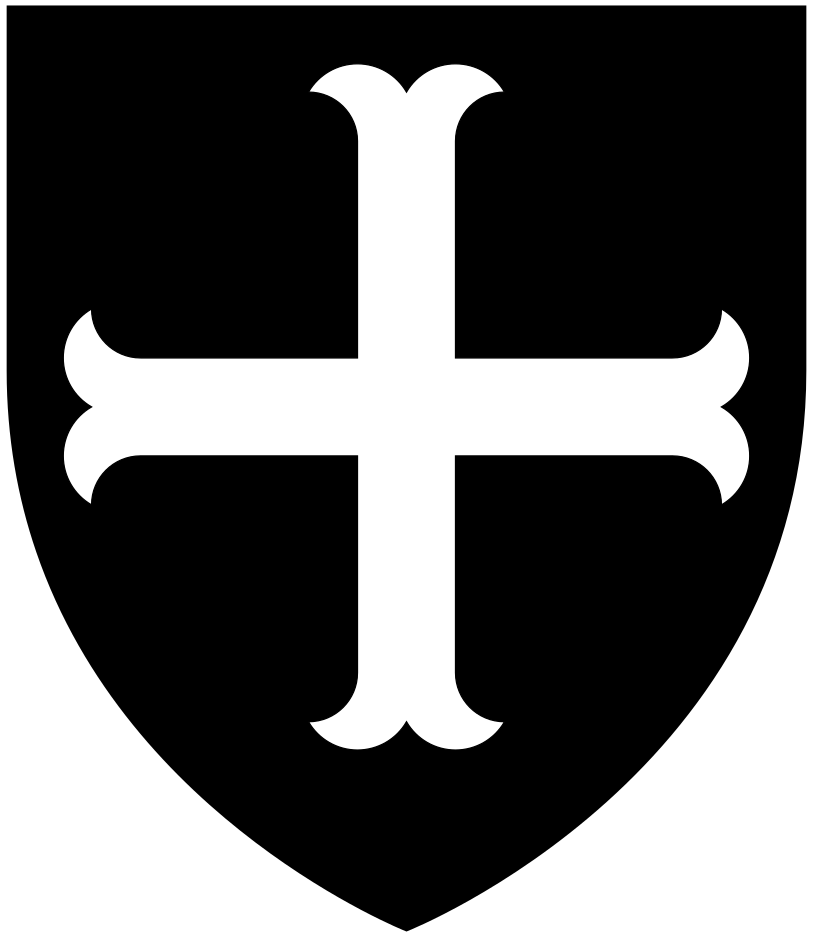
Arms of Upton: Sable, a cross moline argent

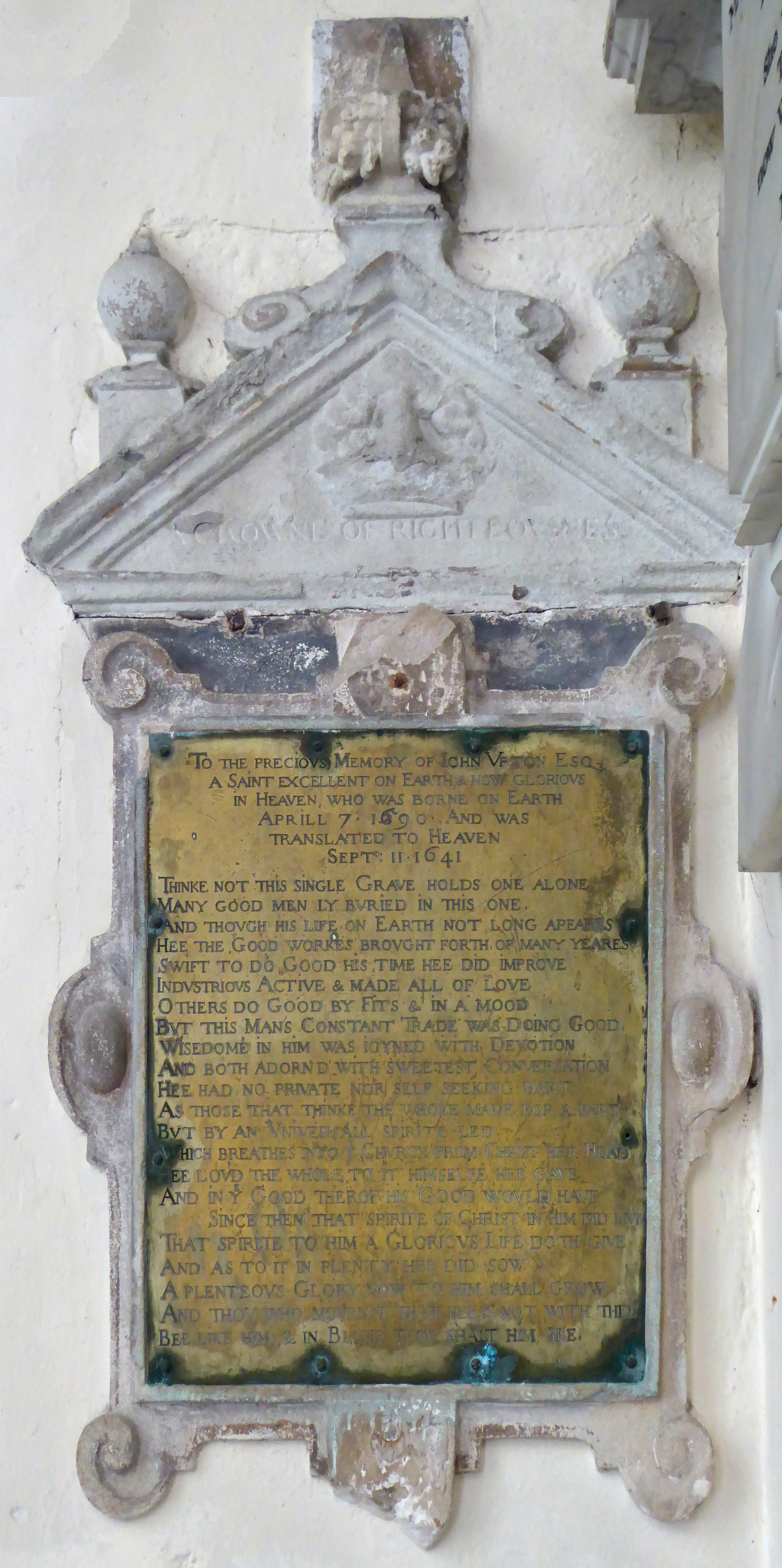
Mural monument to John Upton (d.1641), St Mary's Church, Brixham

John Upton (7 April 1590 – 12 September 1641) of Lupton in the parish of Brixham in Devon, was four times elected a Member of Parliament for Dartmouth in Devon (2 1/2 miles south-west of Lupton) at various times between 1625 and 1641.

== Origins ==
John Upton was born on 7 April 1590 and was baptised at Weare Giffard, North Devon, the 3rd son and heir of Arthur Upton of Lupton, in the parish of Brixham, South Devon, by his wife Gertrude Fortescue (d.1598) a daughter of Hugh Fortescue of Filleigh and Weare Giffard in North Devon, ancestor of the present Earl Fortescue.

The ancient family of Upton originated at the Cornish manor of Upton. A notable early member of this family was Nicholas Upton (c.1400–1457), a cleric, Precentor of Salisbury Cathedral and a writer on heraldry and the art of war. Before inheriting Lupton this branch of the family were seated at Puslinch in the parish of Newton Ferrers in Devon.

== Career ==
In 1625 he was elected a Member of Parliament for Dartmouth, about 2 1/2 miles south-west of Lupton. He was re-elected MP for Dartmouth in 1626 and 1628 and sat until 1629 when King Charles decided to rule without parliament for eleven years. In April 1640 Upton was re-elected MP for Dartmouth in the Short Parliament. He was re-elected for the Long Parliament in November 1640, but died the following year.

== Marriage and children ==
In 1613 Upton married Dorothy Rous (d.1644), a daughter of Sir Anthony Rous (alias Rowse) of Halton in Cornwall, one of that county's richest residents, and a sister of Francis Rous (1579–1659), MP. By his wife he had 6 sons and 8 daughters, including:

- Arthur Upton (1614–1662), eldest son and heir, a Member of Parliament for Devon in 1654 and 1656 during the Protectorate of Oliver Cromwell, who in 1638 married Elizabeth Gould (d.1685), daughter of William Gould of Hayes and widow of Robert Haydon (1604–1634) of Cadhay. Arthur's eldest son and heir was:
  - John Upton (d.1687) of Lupton, a Member of Parliament for Dartmouth from February 1679 to August 1679.

== Death, burial & monument ==
He died aged 51 on 11 September 1641 and was buried in St Mary's Church, Brixham, the parish church of Lupton, where survives his mural monument in the Lupton Chapel forming the east end of the north aisle, inscribed on a brass plate as follows:

"To the precious memory of John Upton Esq., a saint excellent on Earth & now glorious in Heaven, who was borne on Earth Aprill 7 1590 and was translated to Heaven Sept. 11 1641.

Thinke not this single grave holds one alone,
Many good men ly buried in this one,
And though his life on Earth not long apeares,
Hee the good workes brought forth of many yeares;
Swift to do good his time he did improve,
Industrious active & made all of love;
Others do good by fits & in a mood,
But this man's constant trade was doing good;
Wisedome in him was joyned with devotion,
And both adorn'd with sweetest conversation;
He had no private nor self seeking hart,
As those that thinke the whole made for a part,
But by an universall spirite led,
Which breathes into ye Church from Christ her head;
He lov'd the whole to it himselfe hee gave,
And in ye good therof his good would have,
Since then that spirite of Christ in him did live,
That spirite to him a glorious life doth give;
And as to it in plenty hee did sow,
A plenteous glory now to him shall grow,
And thou who mourn'st that hee is not with thee,
Bee like him & in blisse thou shalt him see".

== Sources ==
- Yerby, George & Hunneyball, Paul, biography of "Upton, John (1590-1641), of Lupton, Brixham, Devon", published in: History of Parliament: House of Commons 1604-1629, ed. Andrew Thrush and John P. Ferris, 2010

Parliament of England
Preceded by Richard Matthew; William Plumley	Member of Parliament for Dartmouth; 1625–1629; With: Roger Matthew	Parliament suspended until 1640
Vacant Parliament suspended since 1629	Member of Parliament for Dartmouth; 1640–1641; With: Andrew Voysey 1640; Roger Matthew 1640–1641	Succeeded by Roger Matthew; Samuel Browne
