= John Prideaux (disambiguation) =

John Prideaux was an English academic and bishop.

John Prideaux may also refer to:

- John Prideaux (British Army officer) (1718–1759)
- John Prideaux (MP died 1403), MP for Devon
- John Prideaux (1520-1558), of Nutwell, Devon, MP for Plymouth and Devon

== See also ==
- John Prideaux Lightfoot (1803-1887), English clergyman
