= Henry Fortescue (Lord Chief Justice) =

Member of Parliament (b. c. 1395)

Sir Henry Fortescue
- Arms of Fortescue: Azure, a bend engrailed argent plain cottised or. Motto: Forte Scutum Salus Ducum ("A Strong Shield is the Salvation of Leaders")

Lord Chief Justice of Ireland
- In office 25 June 1426 – 1429
- Preceded by: Stephen de Bray
- Succeeded by: Stephen de Bray

Personal details
- Parent: John Fortescue (father)
- Relatives: Sir John Fortescue (brother)

Sir Henry Fortescue (fl. 1426), was Lord Chief Justice of Ireland.

== Early life ==
Born about 1395, he was the eldest son of John Fortescue and his first wife Clarice. His younger brother was Sir John Fortescue. The earliest surviving record of the Fortescue family relates to their manor of Whympston in the parish of Modbury, Devon.

== Studies ==
It is probable that he was a student of Lincoln's Inn, and almost certain that he was elected member of parliament for Devon on 11 November 1421.

== Chief Justice ==
His appointment as Lord Chief Justice of Ireland is dated 25 June 1426, and for a short period his name occurs several times in the Calendar of the Irish Chancery Rolls. From these entries, which contain all that is known of his career, it appears that a salary was assigned to him of forty pounds per annum, which was soon afterwards altered to forty pence per diem, in addition to the custody of certain manors. Fortescue held his appointment only for seventeen months, and was 'relieved' from it by the king's writ on 8 November 1427.

== Embassy to King Henry VI ==
Almost immediately afterwards he was commissioned by the Parliament of Ireland to accompany Sir James Alleyn, the Chief Justice of the Irish Common Pleas, on a mission to England, to lay before the king (Henry VI of England) the grievances of his Irish subjects.

Again, in 1428, he was sent with Sir Thomas Strange by the lords and commons assembled in Dublin, with the concurrence of Sir John Sutton, the Lord Lieutenant of Ireland, with a number of articles of complaint to be laid again before the king.

One of the grievances which he was instructed to represent related to the insults and assaults made upon himself and Sir James Alleyn during their former mission, from which it may be concluded that their first visit to the court had not met with much success. The other griefs for which the parliament prayed redress related to the frequent changes of governors and justices, the debts left behind them by each successive lord-lieutenant, the exclusion of Irish law students from the English Inns of Court, and the treatment of Irishmen travelling in England.

There is no further mention of Fortescue in the 'Patent Rolls,’ nor is anything known as to his afterlife, beyond the record of an action brought against him to recover certain lands in Nethercombe, Devon.

== Other appointments ==
He was Sheriff of Devon in 1446 and 1452 and Sheriff of Cornwall in 1447.

== Marriage and progeny ==
He was twice married, each time to an heiress:

- Firstly to Joan Boyun (alias Bozun), daughter and heiress of Edmund Boyun of the manor of Wood, in the parish of Woodleigh, South Devon;
- Secondly to the daughter and heiress of Nicholas de Fallopit of the manor of Fallopit in the parish of East Allington, South Devon.

He left sons by each wife, who each inherited their respective mother's properties, and founded two branches of the Devon family of Fortescue. The Fallopit branch soon ended in an heiress, Elizabeth Fortescue, who took the manor by marriage to her cousin Lewis Fortescue (d.1545), a younger son of the Fortescues of Spridleston, in Brixton, Devon, who was a Baron of the Exchequer under King Henry VIII. Their descendant, Anne Hals, married the Rev John Tindal, father of Dr Matthew Tindal and great great grandfather of Sir Nicholas Conyngham Tindal, Chief Justice of the Common Pleas.

Parliament of England
Preceded by Sir Hugh Courtenay; Robert Cary	Member of Parliament for Devon; 1421; With: John Copplestone	Succeeded by William Bonville; Robert Cary
Legal offices
Preceded by Stephen de Bray	Lord Chief Justice of Ireland; 1426–1429	Succeeded by Stephen de Bray
Political offices
Preceded by Nicholas Broughton	High Sheriff of Devon; 1446–1477	Succeeded by Thomas Buttokessyde
Preceded by John Austell	High Sheriff of Cornwall; 1447–1448	Succeeded by John Trevelyan
Preceded by Sir Edward Hill	High Sheriff of Devon; 1452–1453	Succeeded by John Cheney
