= John Cole (born c.1376) =

Member of the Parliament of England

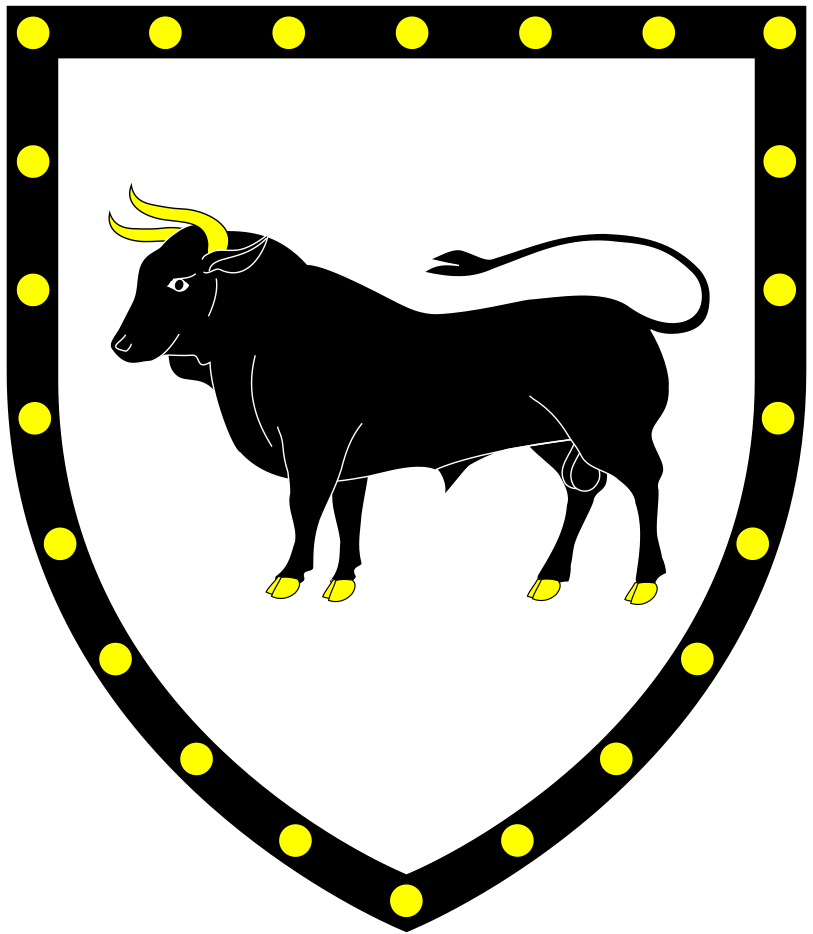
Arms of Cole: Argent, a bull passant sable armed or a bordure of the second bezantée

John Cole (born c.1376) of Nethway in the parish of Brixham in Devon, was twice elected a Member of Parliament for Devon, in 1417 and 1423.

== Sources ==
- Biography of COLE, John IV (b.c.1376), of Nethway, Devon, published in History of Parliament: House of Commons 1386-1421, ed. J.S. Roskell, L. Clark, C. Rawcliffe., 1993

Parliament of England
Unknown	Member of Parliament for Devon; 1417; With: Robert Cary	Succeeded by Edward Pomeroy; Robert Cary
Preceded by William Bonville; Robert Cary	Member of Parliament for Devon; 1423; With: Richard Hankeford	Succeeded by William Bonville; Robert Cary
Political offices
Preceded by John Chusilden	High Sheriff of Devon; 1405–1406	Succeeded by Sir John Herle
