= Thomas Archdeacon =

Thomas Archdeacon may refer to:

- Thomas Archdeacon (senior), MP
- Thomas Archdeacon (junior), MP for Devon in 1420
- Thomas J. Archdeacon (born 1942), American historian

== See also ==
- Thomas the Archdeacon (c. 1200–1268), Roman Catholic cleric, historian and chronicler
