= Philip Cary (MP for Devon) =

English landowner and politician

Philip Cary (died 1437) was an English landowner and politician from Devon.

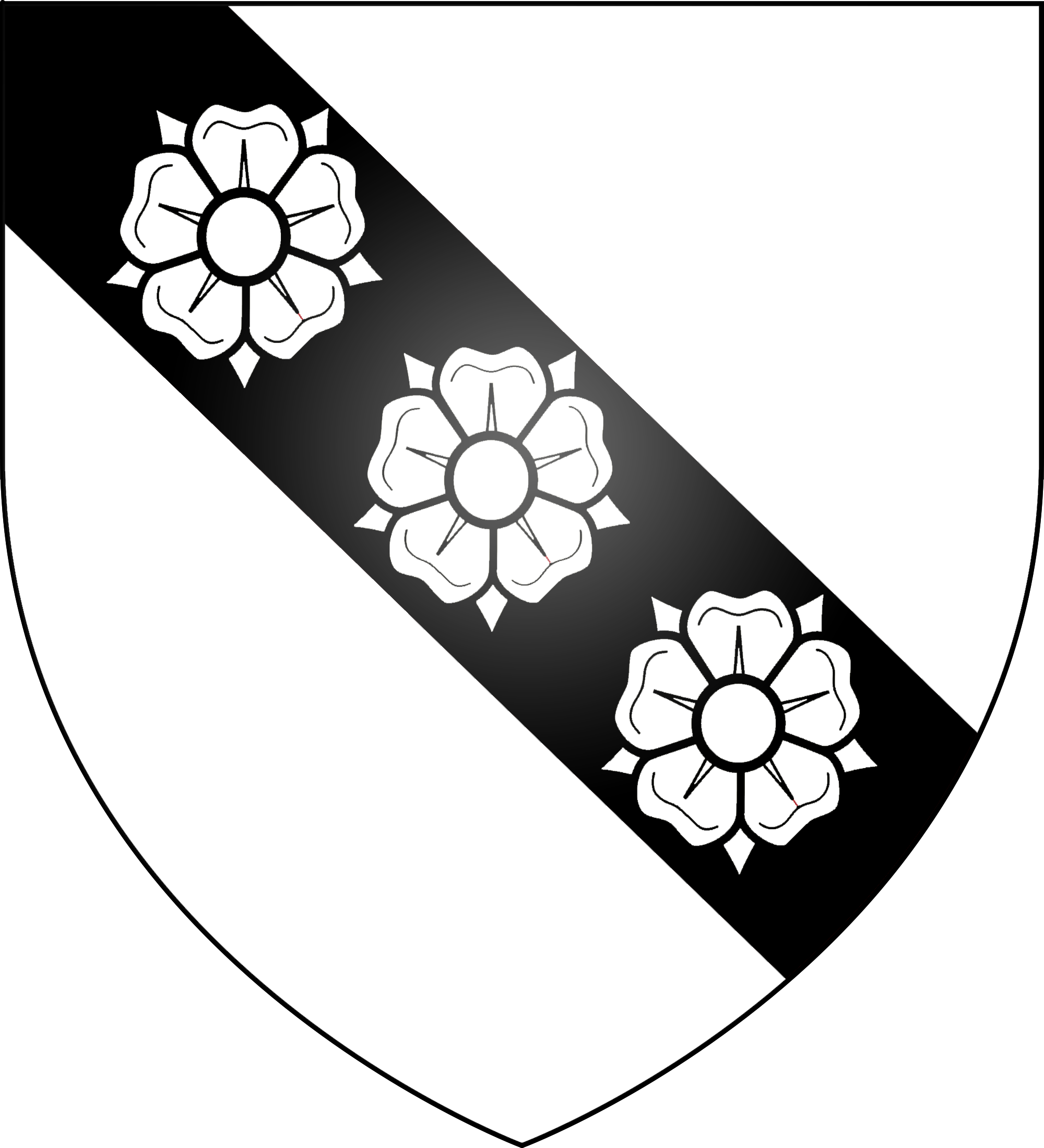
Arms of Cary: Argent, on a bend sable three roses of the field.

== Origins ==
Born about 1400, he was the son and heir of Sir Robert Cary (died about 1431), of Cockington in Devon, and his first wife Margaret Courtenay, daughter of Sir Philip Courtenay (died 1406), of Powderham in Devon, and his wife Anne Wake (died 1390). His paternal grandparents were Sir John Cary (died 1395), of St Giles on the Heath in Devon, and his wife Margaret Holway.

== Career ==
After the lands of his grandfather had been seized by King Richard II, his father had managed to regain Cockington, which passed to him about 1431. Two-thirds he had to put in the hands of trustees for settlement of debts while one-third was reserved for his stepmother Joan, who outlived him. In 1433 he was elected Member of Parliament for Devon. On 1 May 1434 he was on a commission with Bishop Edmund Lacey and Sir Roger Champernowne to receive the oaths of six knights and 68 others for the keeping of the peace in Devon. He died on 23 September 1437, only five weeks after the birth of his heir.

== Family ==
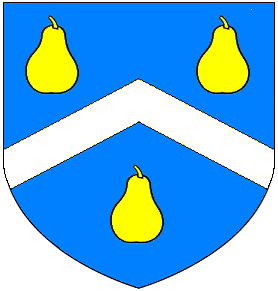
Arms of Orchard of Orchard in Somerset: Azure, a chevron argent between three pears pendant or

About 1422 he married Christian Orchard (died 1472), daughter and heiress of William Orchard (died 1419), of Orchard in Somerset, and they had one son: William Cary, his heir, who married first Elizabeth Paulet and secondly Alice Fulford. Some sources also mention a daughter, Christian Cary, who married Richard Weekes (died 1483), of Honeychurch in Devon. After his death, his widow married Walter Portman, son of William Portman.
