= John Upton (died 1687) =

Member of Parliament from Dartmouth

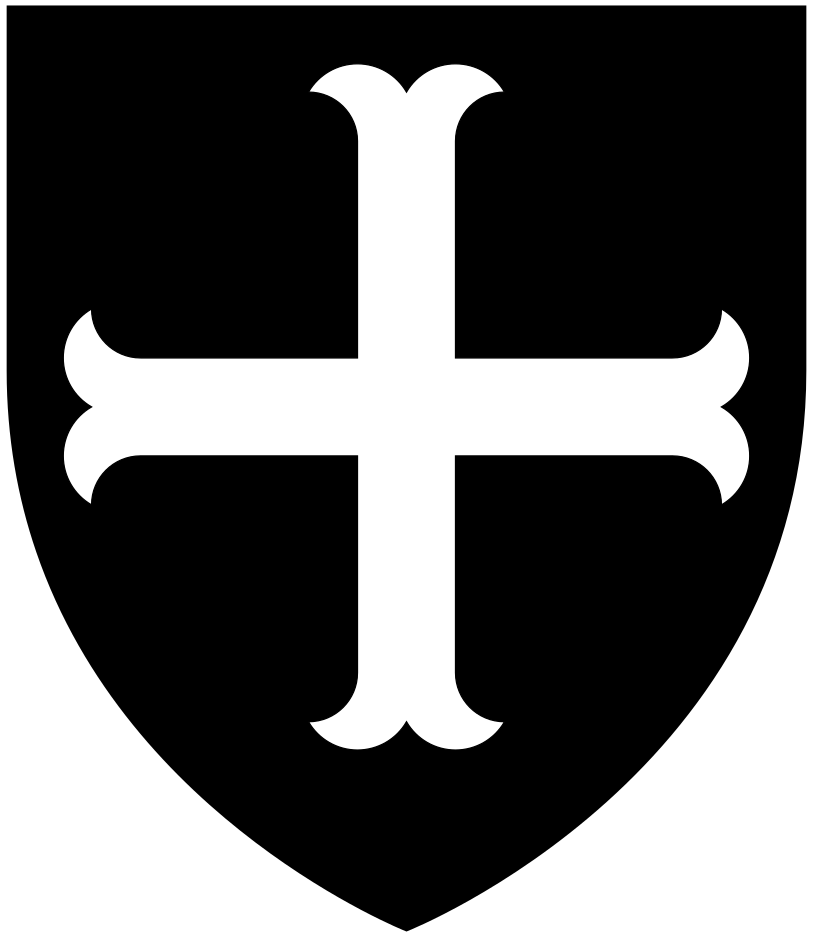
Arms of Upton: Sable, a cross moline argent

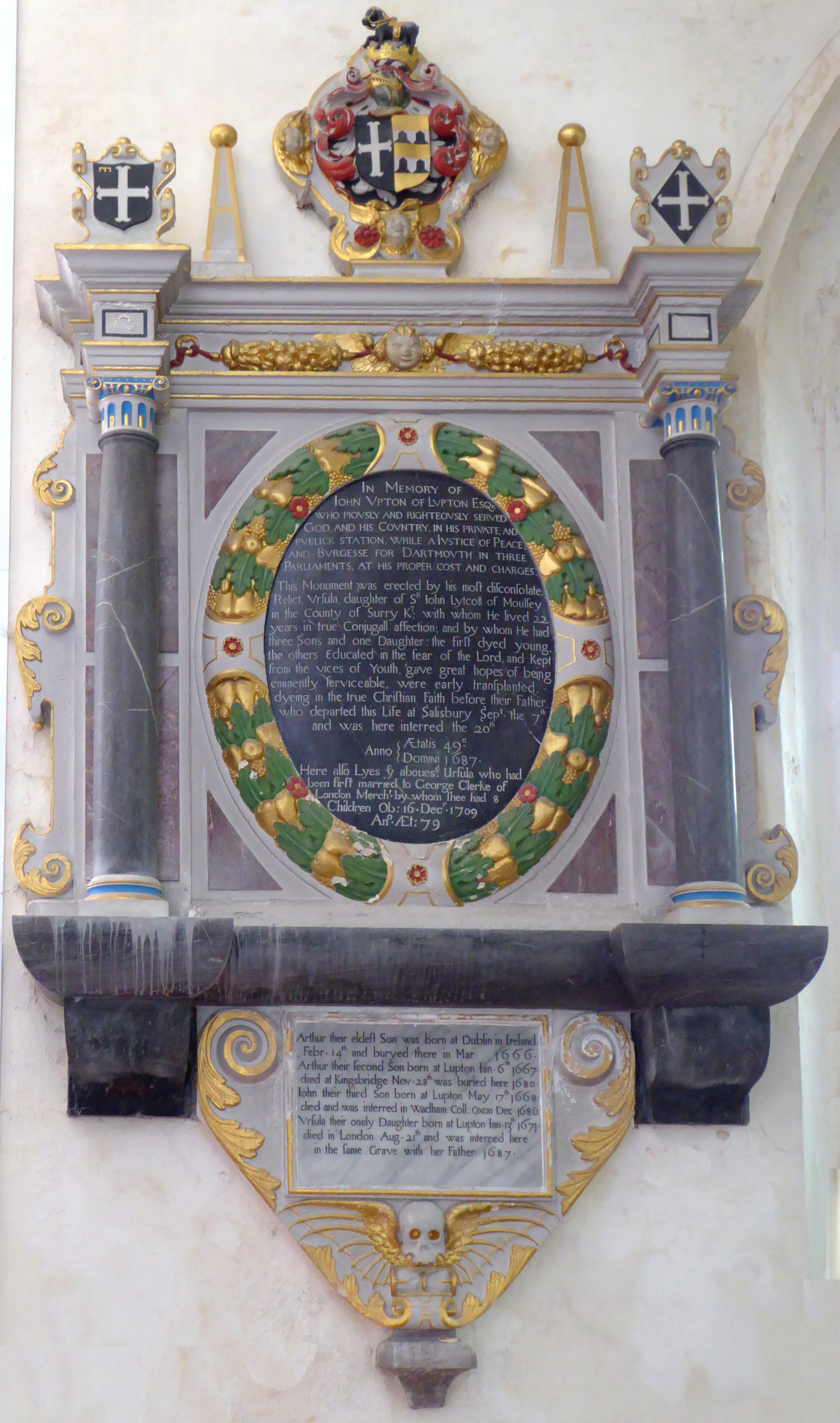
Mural monument to John Upton (died 1687), St Mary's Church, Brixham

John Upton (1639–1687) of Lupton in the parish of Brixham in Devon, was a Member of Parliament for Dartmouth in Devon (2 1/2 miles south-west of Lupton) from February 1679 to August 1679.

== Origins ==
He was the eldest son and heir of Arthur Upton (1614-1662) of Lupton, a Member of Parliament for Devon in 1654 and 1656 during the Protectorate of Oliver Cromwell, by his wife Elizabeth Gould (d. 1685), daughter of William Gould of Floyer Hayes in the parish of St Thomas, Exeter, and widow of Robert Haydon (1604-1634) of Cadhay in the parish of Ottery St Mary, Devon.

== Marriage and children ==
He married Ursula Lytcott (d.1709), a daughter of Sir John Lytcott (died c.1645), of East Molesey in Surrey and widow of George Clerk of the City of London, merchant. Sir John Lytcott was a Gentleman of the Privy Chamber and in 1633 had purchased the manor of East Molesey from Ralph Freeman. Sir John Lytcott was buried in St Mary's Church, East Molesey, where survives his monument and several to members of the Clerk family, his daughter's children, who became his heirs. The arms of Lytcott (Or, two bars vairy argent and sable) are shown impaled by Upton on John Upton's monument in Brixham Church. Ursula's sister Anne Lytcott was the wife of John Thurloe (1616-1668) a Secretary to the Council of State in The Protectorate and spymaster for Oliver Cromwell.

By his wife he had three sons and one daughter, who all predeceased him as follows:

- Arthur I Upton (1666-1666), eldest son and heir apparent, born in Dublin, Ireland, died an infant aged one month.
- Arthur II Upton (1667-1680), second son born at Lupton and died an infant aged three at Kingsbridge, buried Brixham.
- John Upton (1668-1686), third son, born at Lupton and died aged 18 in December 1686, nine months before his father, at Wadham College, Oxford, where he was buried.
- Ursula Upton (1671-1687), only daughter, born at Lupton and died in London on 21 August 1687, aged 16, 17 days before her father and was buried in his grave in Brixham Church.

== Death, burial & monument ==
He died on 7 September 1687 at Salisbury aged 49 and was buried in St Mary's Church, Brixham, on 20 September 1687, where his mural monument survives on the north wall of the nave inscribed as follows:

"In memory of John Upton of Lupton Esq(ui)r(e) who piously and righteously served God and his country in his private and publick station while a justice of peace and burgesse for Dartmouth in three Parliaments at his proper cost and charges. This monument was erected by his most disconsolate relict Ursula, daughter of S(i)r John Lytcott of Moulsey in the county of Surr(e)y, K(nigh)t, with whom he lived 22 years in true conjugall affection and by whom he had three sons and one daughter: the first dyed young and others, educated in the fear of the Lord and kept from the vices of youth, gave great hopes of being eminently serviceable, were early transplanted dyeing in the true Christian faith before their father who departed this life at Salisbury Sept(ember) the 7th and was here interred the 20th Anno Aetatis 49^{o} (Anno) Domini 1687. Here also lyes ye aboves(ai)d Ursula who had been first married to George Clerke of London, Merch(an)t, by whom shee had 8 children, ob(iit) 16 Dec(embe)r 1709 An(n)o Aet(atis) 79".

On a small table below is inscribed:

"Arthur their eldest son was born at Dublin in Ireland Febr(uary) 14th and buryed there in Mar(ch) 1666. Arthur their second son born at Lupton Jan(uary) 6th 1667 died at Kingsbridge Nov(ember) 28th was buried here 1680. John their third son born at Lupton May 17th 1668 died and was interred in Wadham Coll(ege), Oxon Dec(ember) 1686. Ursula their onely daughter born at Lupton Jan(uary)13th 1671 died in London Aug(ust) 21th (sic) and was interred here in the same grave with her father 1687"
