= Arthur Upton (died 1662) =

Arthur Upton (1614-1662) of Lupton in the parish of Brixham in Devon, was a Member of Parliament for Devon in 1654 and 1656 during the Protectorate of Oliver Cromwell.

== Origins ==
He was the eldest son and heir of John Upton (1590-1641) of Lupton, four times a Member of Parliament for Dartmouth in Devon (2 1/2 miles south-west of Lupton) at various times between 1625 and 1641, by his wife Dorothy Rous (d.1644) (alias Rowse), a daughter of Sir Anthony Rous of Halton in Cornwall, and sister of Francis Rous (1579-1659), MP.

== Marriage and children ==
In 1638 he married Elizabeth Gould (d. 1685), daughter of William Gould of Floyer Hayes in the parish of St Thomas, Exeter, and widow of Robert Haydon (1604-1634) of Cadhay in the parish of Ottery St Mary, Devon, by whom he had children including:

- John Upton (d.1687) of Lupton, a Member of Parliament for Dartmouth from February 1679 to August 1679.
