= Andrew Voysey =

English politician

Andrew Voysey (died 1653) was an English politician who sat in the House of Commons in 1640.

Voysey was the son of Simon Voysey and his wife Joan Elliot. He was merchant of Dartmouth, Devon and also Mayor of Dartmouth in or before 1620. In 1626 he was concerned with fortifications for the town of Dartmouth.

In April 1640, Voysey was elected Member of Parliament for Dartmouth in the Short Parliament.

Voysey was living at Ipplepen, where he signed the protestation return in 1641. He died in 1653 and was buried at Townstall on 22 May.

Voysey married Thomasine Martine, daughter of Robert Martine of Dartmouth.

Parliament of England
Vacant Parliament suspended since 1629	Member of Parliament for Dartmouth; 1640; With: John Upton	Succeeded by John Upton; Roger Matthew
