= John Prideaux (by 1520 – 1558) =

Member of the Parliament of England

John Prideaux (by 1520 – 1558), of Upton Pyne, Devon and the Inner Temple, London, was an English Member of Parliament for Plymouth in 1547 and Devon in April 1554.
