= James Alleyn (judge) =

Irish judge

Sir James Alleyn (died c. 1457) was an Irish judge of the fifteenth century. He held the offices of Speaker of the Irish Privy Council, Chief Justice of the Common Pleas for Ireland and Lord Chief Justice of Ireland.

== Background and early career ==
Alleyn was born in County Meath: he later owned lands in that county. He became a justice of the liberty of Ulster in 1425, and was knighted in the same year.

In 1427, he was sent to England by the Parliament of Ireland together with the Lord Chief Justice, Sir Henry Fortescue, to complain to the English Crown of the numerous wrongs suffered by the people of Ireland.

Some of these "wrongs" were personal grievances, as Fortescue and Alleyn complained of the insults and assaults they had suffered in connection with the mission itself, including a claim that they had been physically assaulted. The Crown ordered that those responsible for the injuries to Fortescue and Alleyn should be punished. The mission is generally considered to have been a failure.

== Judicial and political career ==
Alleyn was appointed Chief Justice of the Common Pleas in 1428 but was superseded in 1430. We have a record of his attendance at a meeting of the Privy Council of Ireland in December 1428, which debated the question of whether there was any precedent for the Lord Treasurer of Ireland appointing a Deputy during his absence in England.

In 1444, he was Speaker of the Great Council held at Drogheda, which was mainly concerned with ending the Butler-Talbot feud, which had bedevilled Irish public life for decades. James Butler, 4th Earl of Ormonde, the Lord Lieutenant of Ireland, asked the Council to declare before Robert Manfield, a senior official of the Royal Household, who attended for that purpose, if it had any complaints about his government of the Realm. Alleyn speaking for the entire Council assured Ormond in Manfield's presence that there were no complaints, but that on the contrary, they were entirely grateful for his "good and gracious rule", and his laborious defence of the realm, and that his continued government was necessary for good order. Ormond then requested the Council that his answers be enrolled in the Chancery rolls, and this was done.

In 1447, he became Lord Chief Justice of Ireland "in consideration of his good services to King Henry V and the present King (Henry VI)", at the usual fee.

He died or retired in 1457.

== Sources ==
- Ball, F. Elrington The Judges in Ireland 1221-1921 London John Murray 1926
- Betham, William Dignities Feudal and Parliamentary and the Constitutional Legislature of the United Kingdom William and Thomas Boone London 1830
- Close and Patent Rolls Henry VI
- Stephen, Leslie, ed. (1889). "Fortescue, Henry" . Dictionary of National Biography. Vol. 20. London: Smith, Elder & Co.
- Hawkins, Richard "Alleyn, Sir James" Cambridge Dictionary of National Biography
