= John Dawney =

Sir John Dawney
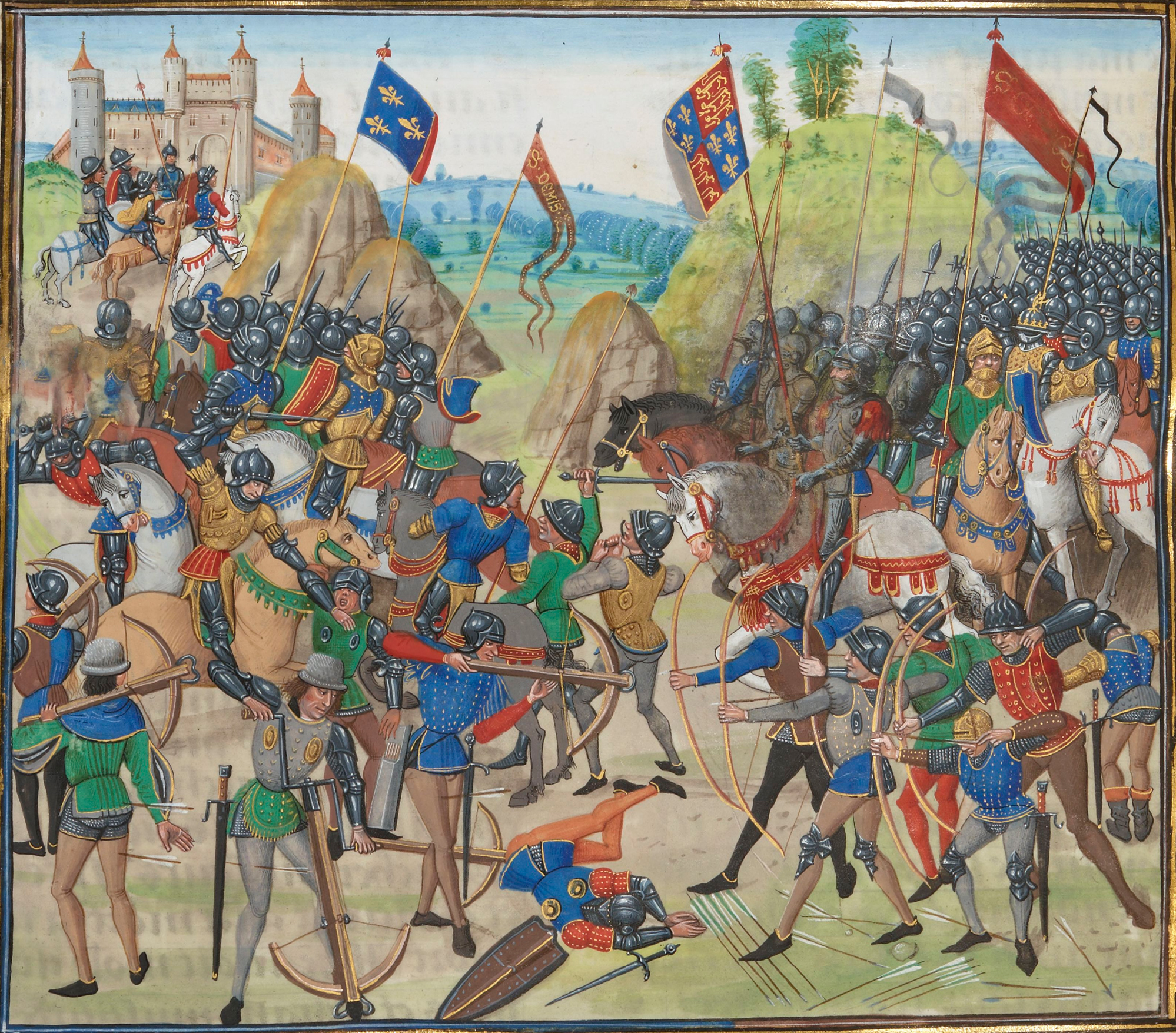
- Battle of Crécy from a 15th-century manuscript of Froissart's Chronicle
- Died: 1346/7
- Spouse: Sybil Treverbyn
- Children: Emeline Dawney
- Parent(s): Nicholas & Elizabeth Dawney

Sir John Dawney or Dawnay (d. 1346/7) was the eldest son of Nicholas Dawney (d. shortly before 15 September 1333) of Mudford Terry, Somerset, and his wife, Elizabeth.

John Dawney's younger brother, Thomas Dawney of Escrick, Yorkshire, married Elizabeth, the daughter of John Newton of Snaith, Yorkshire, and was ancestor of the Viscounts Downe.

John Dawney served in King Edward III's expedition to Honfleur in 1346, and fought at the Battle of Crécy on 26 August 1346, for which he was made a knight banneret. He died shortly after the battle, in 1346/7.

Dawney married Sybil Treverbyn, the daughter of Walter de Treverbyn of Treverbyn, Cornwall. They had one surviving child, a daughter Emeline or Emme (c. 1329 – 28 February 1371), who married Sir Edward Courtenay (c. 1331 – 1368x1371), third son of Hugh Courtenay, 10th Earl of Devon, and by him had two sons, Edward and Hugh. The elder son, Edward (c. 1357 – 5 December 1419), inherited the earldom from his grandfather, the 10th Earl, and became 11th Earl of Devon. The 11th earl married Maud Camoys, and the earldom remained in their descendants until their great-grandson, Thomas Courtenay, 14th Earl of Devon, was beheaded at York on 3 April 1461 after the Battle of Towton, dying without issue. All his honours were forfeited by attainder, and the earldom eventually passed, after a brief period of confusion during the Wars of the Roses (for which see Earl of Devon), by a new creation in 1485 to Edward Courtenay, 1st Earl of Devon (d. 1509), the grandson of Sir Hugh Courtenay of Haccombe and Bampton (1358–1425), brother of the 11th Earl.

Emeline Dawney is said to have brought an estate consisting of "fifteen large manors in Cornwall" to the Courtenay family.

Two effigies under a canopy in the south transept in the parish church of St. Peter and St. Paul at Sheviock, Cornwall, of a knight in gilded armour and his lady are considered to represent Sir Edward Courtenay and his wife, Emeline Dawney. A third effigy of a knight in the north aisle is said to represent Emeline's father, Sir John Dawney. The arms given by Samuel Lysons for the Dawney (Latinised to De Alneto) family are 'Argent, on a bend cotized sable, three annulets of the field'.
