= Devon (UK Parliament constituency) =

Former parliamentary constituency in the United Kingdom

- Former county constituency for the House of Commons
- County: Devon

1290–1832
- Seats: Two
- Replaced by: North Devon; South Devon

Devon was a parliamentary constituency covering the county of Devon in England. It was represented by two Knights of the Shire, in the House of Commons of England until 1707, then of the House of Commons of Great Britain from 1707 to 1800 and finally the House of Commons of the United Kingdom from 1801 to 1832. Elections were held using the bloc vote system of elections.

Under the Reform Act 1832, it was split into two divisions, North Devon and South Devon, for the 1832 general election.

== Boundaries ==
The constituency consisted of the historic county of Devon, excluding the city of Exeter which had the status of a county in itself after 1537. (Although Devon contained a number of other parliamentary boroughs, each of which elected two MPs in its own right for part of the period when Devon was a constituency, these were not excluded from the county constituency, and owning property within the borough could confer a vote at the county election. This was not the case, though, for Exeter.)

== Members of Parliament ==
=== 1290–1640 ===
Constituency created 1290, during the reign of King Edward I (1272–1307).

Parliaments of Edward I (1272–1307)
Year	First member	Second member
1290 (Jul)	Sir Robert de Wodeton	Sir Andrew Trelosk of Dunterton
1294 (Nov)	unknown	
1295 (Nov), the Model Parliament	Sir Robert de Wodeton	Sir William Prous of Gidleigh (1245–1315)
1297 (Oct)	Sir Henry Ralegh of Strete Ralegh in Whimple	Sir Hugh Prous of Gatcombe in Colyton
1298 (May)	Sir John Umfraville of Lapford	Sir William Champernowne (c.1240–1304) of Ilfracombe
1300 (Mar)	Sir Robert Beaple of Knowstone	Sir Reginald Ferrers of Bere and Newton Ferrers

Parliaments of Edward III (1327–1377)
Year	First member	Second member
1331	Sir Roger de Pridias (Prideaux) of Orcheton, Modbury	
1340	Adam de Branscombe	
1356/7	John Daubernon of Dunsland	
1364	Sir John Cary (d. 1395) of Cockington, Devon, Chief Baron of the Exchequer	Sir William Cary (brother)
1348	Adam de Branscombe	
1369	Sir John Cary (d. 1395) of Cockington, Devon, Chief Baron of the Exchequer	Sir William Cary (brother)
1371	Sir William Bonville	
Sir William Bonville

Parliaments of Richard II
Year	First member	Second member
1377 (Oct)	Sir William Bonville	
1378	Sir William Bonville	
1379	Sir William Bonville	
1379	John Beaumont (d. 1379/80)	
1380	John Beaumont (d. 1379/80)	
1380 (Nov)	Sir William Bonville	
1381	Sir William Bonville	
1382 (May)	Sir William Bonville	
1382 (Oct)	Sir William Bonville	
1383	Sir Philip Courtenay	
1383	Ivo FitzWarin	
1384 (Apr)	Sir William Bonville	
1385	Sir John Stretch	
1386	Sir Philip Courtenay	Sir John Stretch
1388 (Feb)	Sir Philip Courtenay	Sir John Prideaux
1388 (Sep)	Sir John Stretch	Sir John Grenville
1390 (Jan)	Sir Philip Courtenay	Sir James de Chudleigh
1390 (Nov)	Sir James de Chudleigh	John Prescott
1391	Sir James de Chudleigh	Sir William Sturmy
1393	Sir Philip Courtenay	Sir James de Chudleigh
1394	Sir John Grenville	Sir James de Chudleigh
1395	Sir Philip Courtenay	Sir Hugh Courtenay
1397 (Jan)	Sir William Bonville	Sir John Grenville
1397 (Sep)	Sir Hugh Courtenay	Sir William Bonville

Parliaments of Henry IV
Year	First member	Second member
1399	Sir Philip Courtenay	John Stretch
1401	Sir Philip Courtenay	Sir John Wadham
1402	Sir William Bonville	Sir John Grenville
1404 (Jan)	Sir Thomas Pomeroy	Edmund Pyne
1404 (Oct)	Sir William Sturmy	Walter Reynell
1406	Sir Hugh Luttrell	Sir Thomas Pomeroy
1407	Sir Hugh Luttrell	Robert Cary
1410	Sir Thomas Pomeroy	Robert Cary
1411	Edmund Pyne	Robert Cary

Parliaments of Henry V
Year	First member	Second member
1413 (Feb)		
1413 (May)	Sir Thomas Pomeroy	Robert Cary
1414 (Apr)	John St. Aubyn	Robert Cary
1414 (Nov)	Richard I Hankford	John Arundell
1415		
1416 (Mar)	Richard I Hankford	Robert Cary
1416 (Oct)		
1417	John Cole	Robert Cary
1419	Edward Pomeroy	Robert Cary
1420	Sir Robert Chalons	Thomas Archdeacon
1421 (May)	Sir Hugh Courtenay	Robert Cary
1421 (Dec)	John Copplestone	Henry Fortescue

Parliaments of Henry VI
No	Year	First member	Second member
1st	1422	William Bonville, 1st Baron Bonville	Robert Cary
2nd	1423	Richard Hankeford	John Cole
3rd	1425	William Bonville, 1st Baron Bonville	Robert Cary
4th	1426	Robert Cary	James Chuddelegh
5th	1427	Philip Courtenay	William Bonville, 1st Baron Bonville (& John Reynell 1427/8)
6th	1429		
7th	1430		
8th	1432		
9th	1433	Sir Philip Cary	
10th	1435	Nicholas Radford	John Copplestone
17	1439	John Copplestone	
33	1454/5	Walter Reynell (died 1478) of Malston in the parish of Sherford, Devon	

Parliaments of Edward IV
Year	First member	Second member
1491	John Crocker	

Year	First member	Second member
1510–1523	No names known	
1529	Sir William Courtenay (d. 1535) of Powderham, died Nov.1535 and repl. Jan 1536 by George Carew	Sir Thomas Denys
1536		
1539	Sir Thomas Denys	Richard Pollard
1542	Richard Pollard	?Gawain Carew
1545	?	Sir Gawain Carew

Parliaments of Edward VII
Year	First member	Second member
1547	Sir Gawain Carew	John Chichester
1553 (Mar)	Sir Peter Carew	John Fulford

Parliaments of Mary I
Year	First member	Second member
1553 (Oct)	Sir Peter Carew	Sir Thomas Denys
1554 (Apr)	Sir John Chichester	John Prideaux
1554 (Nov)	James Bassett	James Courtenay
1555	James Bassett	Robert Denys

Parliaments of Elizabeth I
Year	First member	Second member
1558	James Bassett	George Kirkham
1559	Sir Peter Carew	Sir John St Leger
1563–1567	John Chichester	Gawin Carew
1571	Sir John St Leger	Peter Edgcumbe
1572–1583	Sir John St Leger	Arthur Bassett
1584–1585	Walter Raleigh	William Courtenay
1586–1587	Walter Raleigh	John Chudleigh
1588–1589	William Courtenay	George Cary
1593	Sir Thomas Denys	Sir Edward Seymour, 1st Baronet
1597–1598	William Strode	Amias Bampfield
1601	William Courtenay	Sir Edward Seymour, 1st Baronet

Parliaments of James I
Year	First member	Second member
1604–1611	Sir Edward Seymour, 1st Baronet	Thomas Ridgeway
(from 1607)	Sir Edward Seymour, 1st Baronet	Sir John Acland
1614	John Drake	Sir Edward Giles
1621–1622	John Drake	Sir Edward Seymour, 2nd Baronet
1624–1625	John Drake	Sir William Strode

Parliaments of Charles I
Year	First member	Second member
1625	Francis Fulford	Francis Courtenay
1626	John Drake	John Pole
1628–1629	John Bampfield	Sir Francis Drake, Bt

=== 1640–1832 ===
Year	First member	First party	Second member	Second party
April 1640	Sir Edward Seymour, 3rd Baronet	Royalist	Thomas Wyse	
November 1640	Sir Edward Seymour, 3rd Baronet	Royalist	Thomas Wyse	
1641	Sir Edward Seymour, 3rd Baronet	Royalist	Sir Samuel Rolle	Parliamentarian
January 1643	Seymour disabled to sit – seat vacant		Sir Samuel Rolle	Parliamentarian
1646	Sir Nicholas Martyn		Sir Samuel Rolle	Parliamentarian
1648	Sir Nicholas Martyn		William Morice	
December 1648	Morice and Martyn excluded in Pride's Purge – both seats vacant.			
1653	Seven nominated members in the Barebones Parliament: George Monck, John Carew, Thomas Saunders, Christopher Martyn, James Erisey, Francis Rous, Richard Sweet			
Devon's representation was increased to 11 MPs in the First and Second Parliaments of the Protectorate
1654	Thomas Saunders, Robert Rolle, Arthur Upton, Thomas Reynell, William Morice, John Hale, William Bastard, William Fry, Sir John Northcote, Bt, Henry Hatsell, John Quick			
1656	Thomas Saunders, Robert Rolle, Arthur Upton, Thomas Reynell, William Morice, John Hale, Sir John Northcote, Bt, Captain Henry Hatsell, Sir John Yonge, Edmund Fowell, John Doddridge			
January 1659	Sir John Northcote, Bt		Robert Rolle	
May 1659	Not represented in the restored Rump			
April 1660	George Monck		Sir John Northcote, Bt	
July 1660	Sir Edward Seymour, 3rd Baronet		Sir John Northcote, Bt	
1661	Sir Hugh Pollard, Bt		Sir John Rolle	
1667	Earl of Torrington		Sir John Rolle	
1671	Sir Coplestone Bampfylde, Bt		Sir John Rolle	
February 1679	Sir Edward Seymour, 4th Baronet	Tory	Sir William Courtenay, Bt	
September 1679	Samuel Rolle		Sir William Courtenay, Bt	
1685	Sir Bourchier Wrey, Bt		Sir Coplestone Bampfylde, Bt	
1689	Francis Courtenay		Samuel Rolle	
September 1699	Thomas Drewe		Samuel Rolle	
January 1701	Sir William Courtenay, Bt		Samuel Rolle	
December 1701	Sir William Courtenay, Bt		Sir John Pole, Bt	
1702	Sir William Courtenay, Bt		Robert Rolle	
1710	Sir William Pole		John Rolle	Tory
1712	Sir William Courtenay, Bt	Tory	John Rolle	Tory
1713	Sir William Courtenay, Bt	Tory	Sir Coplestone Bampfylde, Bt	Tory
1727	Sir William Courtenay, Bt	Tory	John Rolle	Tory
1730	Sir William Courtenay, Bt	Tory	Henry Rolle	
1736	John Bampfylde		Henry Rolle	
1741	Sir William Courtenay, Bt		Theophilus Fortescue	
1746	Sir William Courtenay, Bt		Sir Thomas Dyke-Acland, Bt	
1747	Sir William Courtenay, Bt		Sir Richard Bampfylde, Bt	
1762	John Parker		Sir Richard Bampfylde, Bt	
1776	John Parker		John Rolle Walter	
1780	John Parker		John Rolle	
1784	John Pollexfen Bastard	Tory	John Rolle	
1796	John Pollexfen Bastard	Tory	Sir Lawrence Palk, Bt	
1812	John Pollexfen Bastard	Tory	Sir Thomas Dyke-Acland, Bt	Tory
1816	Edmund Pollexfen Bastard		Sir Thomas Dyke-Acland, Bt	Tory
1818	Edmund Pollexfen Bastard		Viscount Ebrington	Whig
1820	Edmund Pollexfen Bastard		Sir Thomas Dyke-Acland, Bt	Tory
1830	Viscount Ebrington	Whig	Sir Thomas Dyke-Acland, Bt	Tory
1831	Viscount Ebrington	Whig	Lord John Russell	Whig

- Constituency abolished (1832)

== See also ==
- List of former United Kingdom Parliament constituencies
- Unreformed House of Commons
