= John Prideaux (MP died 1403) =

Member of the Parliament of England

Sir John Prideaux (c. 1347 – 1403), of Orcheton in Modbury, Devon, was an English Member of Parliament for Devon in October 1383 and February 1386.
