= Philip Courtenay (died 1406) =

English politician (c.1355–1406)

Sir Philip Courtenay of Powderham
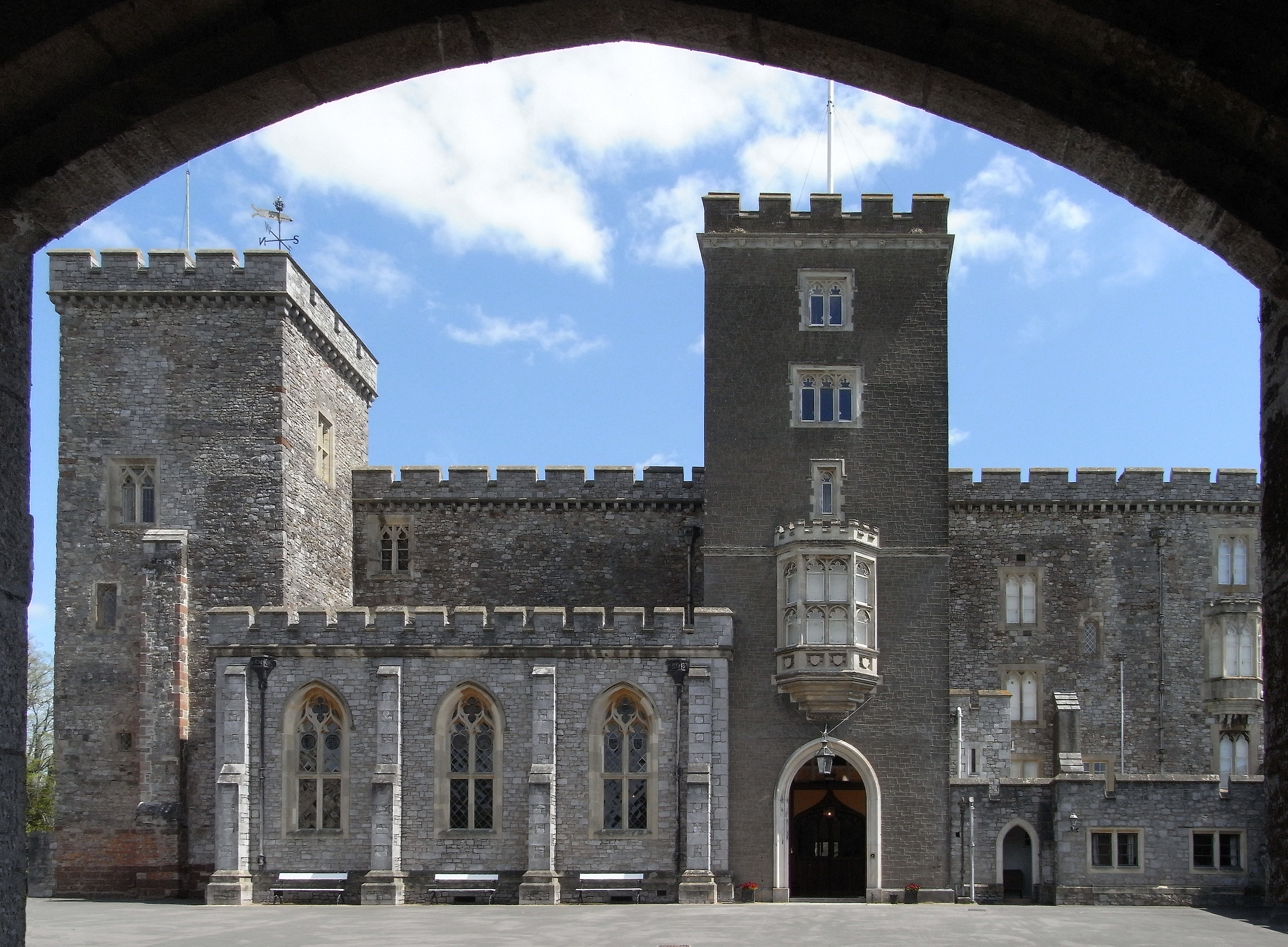
- Powderham Castle, west front. The leftmost tower and great hall within the high central block were built by Sir Philip Courtenay, c. 1390.
- Born: c. 1355
- Died: 29 July 1406
- Noble family: Courtenay
- Spouse: Anne Wake
- Issue: Richard Courtenay; Sir John Courtenay; Sir William Courtenay; Agnes Courtenay; Margaret Courtenay
- Father: Hugh Courtenay, 10th Earl of Devon
- Mother: Margaret de Bohun

Arms of Courtenay of Powderham: Or, three torteaux a label azure. These were the arms of Hugh Courtenay, 2nd Earl of Devon (d. 1377), and can be seen impaling Bohun on the monumental brass of one of his younger sons Sir Peter Courtenay, KG (d. 1405) in Exeter Cathedral

Sir Philip Courtenay (c. 1355 – 29 July 1406), of Powderham, Devon was the fifth son of Hugh Courtenay, 10th Earl of Devon (1303–1377). He was the founder of the cadet dynasty known as "Courtenay of Powderham", seated at the manor of Powderham, until then a former Bohun manor of little importance, whilst the line descended from his elder brother, the Earls of Devon of the mediaeval era, continued to be seated at Tiverton Castle and Okehampton.

== Origins ==
Sir Philip Courtenay was the fifth son of eight sons of Hugh Courtenay, 10th Earl of Devon (1303–1377) and Margaret de Bohun, daughter of Humphrey de Bohun, 4th Earl of Hereford by his wife Elizabeth Plantagenet (1282–1316), a daughter of King Edward I.

== Military and naval career ==
He was known as a rash, angry and temperamental man but was skilful in naval and military affairs. Philip served during the Spanish War. He was with Edward the Black Prince at the famous victory of the Battle of Nájera. He was knighted before the battle with his brothers Peter Courtenay, KG, and Hugh Courtenay, KG

On his return, Sir Philip was made Admiral of the West on 7 October 1372 responsible for defending a coast plagued by pirates he held that post until 16 July 1376. In 1373 he was put in charge of a large supply convoy to Gascony. In August, the expedition took the Castle of Gurry.

Back in England, he launched a petition to parliament protesting against the corruption of the Stannaries, which he claimed was preventing the protection and patrol of the coastline. That August, Philip was engaged with Peter in a desperate battle against the Spaniards during which they were both captured as supplies failed to get through to Gascony. Two Bristol burgesses paid a large ransom for their release. In return, they were granted trading exemptions from customs tax.

On 8 March 1380 he was once again appointed Admiral of the West till 1381. In February 1383, he became Lord Lieutenant of Ireland, serving for 10 years under King Richard II. He attended the parliament that met at Salisbury in April 1384, but in July his duties were taken over by the deputies. In 1385 the king gave him powers of administration in Dublin. He did not stay long and returned to London on 6 May. That Christmas the Great Council met to discuss charges of extortion levelled at Courtenay. In January 1386 he was dismissed from his post, and arrested by the Crown in March. Sir Robert de Vere was created Marquess of Dublin and Viceroy. By 1387, De Vere was styling himself as duke of Ireland. Courtenay was elected to the Commons in October 1386, and petitioned against the perceived injustice. He received compensation for the loss of Ireland. By the end of 1387, the Lords Appellant had banished de Vere.

== Landholdings ==
Courtenay also served as Steward of Cornwall in the 12th year of the reign of Richard II. Pope Urban VI challenged the English to join a Crusade in 1383. John of Gaunt opposed any such venture, whereas the clerical party was supported by Henry le Despencer, Bishop of Norwich and Sir Philip Courtenay. Gaunt made the Priory of Somborne over to the Courtenays. There in Hampshire they attacked and tortured the Carmelites, and when they accused Gaunt of treason, the knights caused the death of the friar.

It was perhaps as well for his privilege that Sir Philip was elected to parliament in February 1383, for he was not a favourite of Richard II. Edward III had granted him a pension of £100 for life, which was confirmed by Richard II in 1378. The Black Prince had granted him two annuities of £50 each from the Duchy of Cornwall, which were doubled in 1393.

Richard II demanded his presence in parliament because he had been given the official post of Keeper of Dartmoor forest in 1370, and granted substantial estates in Devon from 1380. In March 1388, he received four parks, which he forfeited to the Merciless Parliament. In 1389 he was given the post of Lord Warden of the Stannaries and granted the Royal Manor of Haslebury Plucknett for a period of six years. In 1391, the manor of Dartmoor and the manor of Bradninch were granted to him and his wife, for the sum of £39 p/a. All these landholding decisions were confirmed by Henry IV.

In December 1404, the king ordered Philip to grant Dartmoor and Bradninch to Henry, Prince of Wales.

== Ireland ==
Courtenay was still Steward of the Duchy of Cornwall until 1392. Two years later he was preparing to go on an expedition with the king to Ireland. Philip was in charge of royal household arrangements as the steward. He was to this end commissioned to find fish from Devon and Cornwall for provisions. Whilst in Ireland he soon fell out with Robert de Vere, Duke of Ireland, the royal favourite, and was removed as royal troops commissioner. He also clashed with Robert Wikeford, the Archbishop of Dublin.

== Military experience ==
By 1399 Sir Philip was an experienced soldier called upon to suppress the Welsh revolt. He called up the Commissions of Array. He bought transporters of the soldiers and horses for the 1402 expedition to Brittany, and the sailing against the king of Scotland in 1400.

== Politician ==
He criticised ships lying idle in the docks, and reported to the Royal Council. They urged Henry IV to bring the experience of the West Country men in provisioning stores against France in 1402. Sir Philip also sat on the Council of 1405. Despite falling into terrible debts governing Ireland, he was exonerated of any crimes and pardoned by the king in 1393. When two men were dispossessed of their property Philip encouraged arbitrators Sir Peter Chudleigh and Sir James Chudleigh MP to decide. Many men complained of Courtenay's conduct: Sir Thomas Pomeroy was returned some property lost in Exeter in 1402. And Nicholas Potyngton managed to renew his complaint of 1393 for the loss of the manor of Bickleigh. Abbot of Newenham's property was stolen by sixty retainers; Courtenay ignored the summons to appear in Westminster. This he also did when summoned to answer for his conduct in forbidding the Abbot of Beaulieu access to his abbey.

== Imprisonment ==
Sir Philip was imprisoned in the Tower in November 1402 for clerical abuses against the Church. On 29 November he was forced to pay a recognizance of £100 by Sir John Arundell, and to Sir John Herle and Sir William Sturmy a surety of £1000.

== Inheritance ==
Philip had been very fortunate to receive property on the death of relatives. In 1357 he received the reversion of the manor of Moreton on the death of his brother, Thomas. In 1374 he had gained Broadwindsor and Cadleigh on the death of his brother, Sir Peter Courtenay, and the reversion of Honiton and Nuneham Courtenay, and East Coker. The Earl left him 100 marks in his will. In 1377, Sir Philip returned advowsons of Honiton and East Coker to Exeter Cathedral to construct a memorial to his father. His mother also left him seven manors from 1391 as well as her chapel.

Philip was granted Powderham Castle by his mother upon her death in 1391, as well as seven other manors. He was succeeded by his son, Richard, Lord Chancellor and Bishop of Ireland, upon his death on 29 July 1406. At that time he held one manor and hamlet in Dorset; three manors and a moiety and three advowsons in Somerset; and seventeen manors and five advowsons in Devon with some smaller properties. He was valued in 1405 to have an income of £140 per annum.

== Marriage and children ==
Courtenay married Anne Wake, the daughter of Sir Thomas Wake of Blisworth, Northamptonshire, by Alice de Pateshulle, the daughter of Sir John de Pateshulle. They had three sons and two daughters:

- Richard Courtenay (died 1415), Bishop of Norwich, son and heir.

Arms of Courtenay impaling Champernowne: Gules, a saltire vair between twelve billets or

- Sir John Courtenay (died before 1415), second son, who pre-deceased his father and elder brother. He married Joan Champernoun (died 1419) daughter of Sir Richard Champernoun of Modbury, Devon. They had two sons, Sir Philip Courtenay (18 January 1404 – 16 December 1463), of Powderham, heir to his uncle Bishop Richard Courtenay, and Sir Humphrey Courtenay.
- Sir William Courtenay
- Agnes Courtenay, who married Sir Otes Champernoun
- Margaret Courtenay, who married (as his first wife) Sir Robert Cary (died c. 1431) of Cockington, Devon, twelve times Member of Parliament for Devon. Some genealogies list her as without progeny, but their son was Philip Cary.

== Ancestry ==
Ancestors of Philip Courtenay (died 1406)

John de Courtenay
Hugh de Courtenay
Hugh de Courtenay, 9th Earl of Devon
Hugh le Despencer, 1st Baron le Despencer
Eleanor le Despenser
Aline Basset
Hugh Courtenay, 2nd Earl of Devon
Sir John de St John
Agnes de St John
Sir Philip Courtenay
Humphrey de Bohun
Humphrey de Bohun, 3rd Earl of Hereford
Eleanor de Braose
Humphrey de Bohun, 4th Earl of Hereford
Enguerrand II de Fiennes
Maud de Fiennes
Isabelle de Conde
Margaret de Bohun, 2nd Countess of Devon
Henry III of England
Edward I of England
Eleanor of Provence
Elizabeth of Rhuddlan
Ferdinand III of Castile
Eleanor of Castile
Jeanne, Countess of Ponthieu

== Notes ==
=== References ===
- Campion, Gilbert, ed. (1946), Erskine May: Parliamentary Practice (14th ed.), pp. 68–69
- Rawcliffe, Carole (1990), "Parliament and the settlement of disputes by arbitration in the later Middle Ages", Parliamentary History, 9 (2): 316–342, doi:10.1111/j.1750-0206.1990.tb00566.x
- Carpenter, William (1867), Peerage for the people, William Carpenter, pp. 203–204
- Richardson, Douglas (2011), Everingham, Kimball G. (ed.), Magna Carta Ancestry: A Study in Colonial and Medieval Families, vol. I (2nd ed.), Salt Lake City, ISBN 978-1449966379
- Richardson, Douglas (2011), Everingham, Kimball G. (ed.), Magna Carta Ancestry: A Study in Colonial and Medieval Families, vol. II (2nd ed.), Salt Lake City, ISBN 978-1449966386
- Vivian, John Lambrick (1887), The visitations of Cornwall: comprising the Heralds' visitations of 1530, 1573 & 1620, W. Pollard, pp. 106, 108
- White, William (1874), History, gazetteer and directory of the county of Devon: including the city of Exeter, and comprising a general survey of the county, White, p. 675
