= John Copplestone =

Member of the Parliament of England

John Copplestone (died 1458) of Copplestone in Colebrooke, Devon was an English Member of Parliament.

He was the son and heir of John Copplestone of Copplestone, by ?Katherine, the daughter and heiress of John Graas of Tengrace.

He was steward of the estates of Bishop of Exeter from 1417 to c.1419, joint keeper of the temporalities of the bishopric from 1419 to 1420 and steward of Bishop Lacey’s estates from c.1420 to after 1440. He was also Escheator of Devon and Cornwall in 1418–19, 1422–23 and January to December 1426.

He was elected to represent the county of Devon in the House of Commons in December 1421, 1435 and 1439.

He sat on numerous commissions, including commissions of enquiry into piracy, navy desertions, prisoner escapes and wills. He became joint receiver-general of the Duchy of Cornwall, joint steward of the duchy's Devon estates and joint Warden of the Stannaries for Devon from May 1422 to February 1423. Towards the end of his working life he was steward of the estates of the Earl of Devon (1422–1423) and joint steward from 1423 to c.1435.

He died in 1458. He had married Elizabeth, the daughter of fellow MP John Hawley (died 1436) and left 3 sons.
