= James de Chudleigh =

English knight, royal servant, nobleman and landowner

James Chudleigh (b. ~1331, d. 1401–1402) was an English knight, Sheriff of Devon, royal servant, nobleman and landowner. He was one of the most important noblemen below peerage rank in Devon in the last two decades of the 14th century. Chudleigh lived roughly 70 years during the height of the Black Death and the start of the Hundred Years' War.

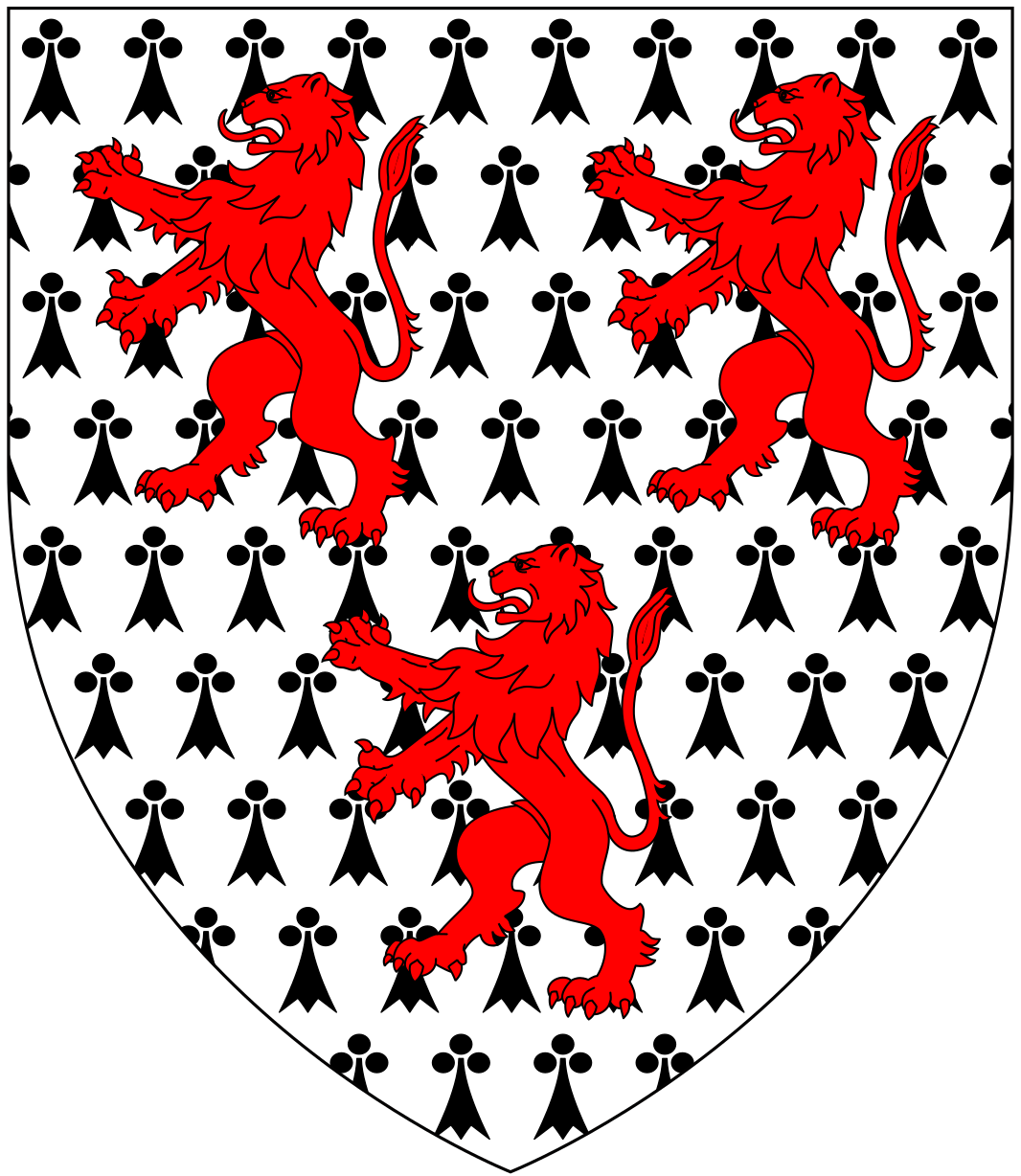
Chudleigh coat of arms

== Career ==
He began as a combat squire and served in this capacity for many years probably originally lacking sufficient wealth to be considered a knight. Chudleigh was called into the Scrope v Grosvenor case of 1389 in which he stated that he fought in the Battle of Poitiers in 1356, serving as a squire; he also served under John of Gaunt in Spain in his failed invasion of 1386. His participation in the battle of Poiters under Edward Despenser, 1st Baron Despenser is confirmed by a letter of protection (TNA, C76/56, m. 31). In 1368 he again traveled overseas to an unknown destination. From May 1372 to January 1373 he served at sea under Philip Courtenay, admiral of the west.

After a lengthy military career Chudleigh had built up prestige, land, and power and was appointed Sheriff of Devon in 1376 as his father had served in 1335.

In 1384 he was again the Sheriff of Devon. Later he was part of the Earl of Devon's retinue which joined the 1387 expedition under Admiral of the west Richard Fitzalan, 4th Earl of Arundel. In 1390 he was the Knight of the shire for Devon as the second knight (the first was Courtenay).

Although Chudleigh derived much of his power from the Earls of Devon, he became an important royal servant and these two loyalties sometimes clashed. In 1391 he and a knight, William Esturmy, were responsible for arresting one of the Earl's retainers. Chudleigh was often employed by the King to enforce royal authority in Devon, for example arbitrating Courtenay's land disputes. Due to his royal service he benefitted from escheats, and was given temporary control of escheated lands on several occasions. In 1394 he was again the sheriff of Devon.

A dispensation allowed his daughter Joan Chudleigh to remarry Philip Bryan son of Guy Bryan, 1st Baron Bryan in order to stop feuding that had occurred between the two fathers.

== Personal life ==
His third marriage was to Joan Champernon.
