= John Cary (died 1395) =

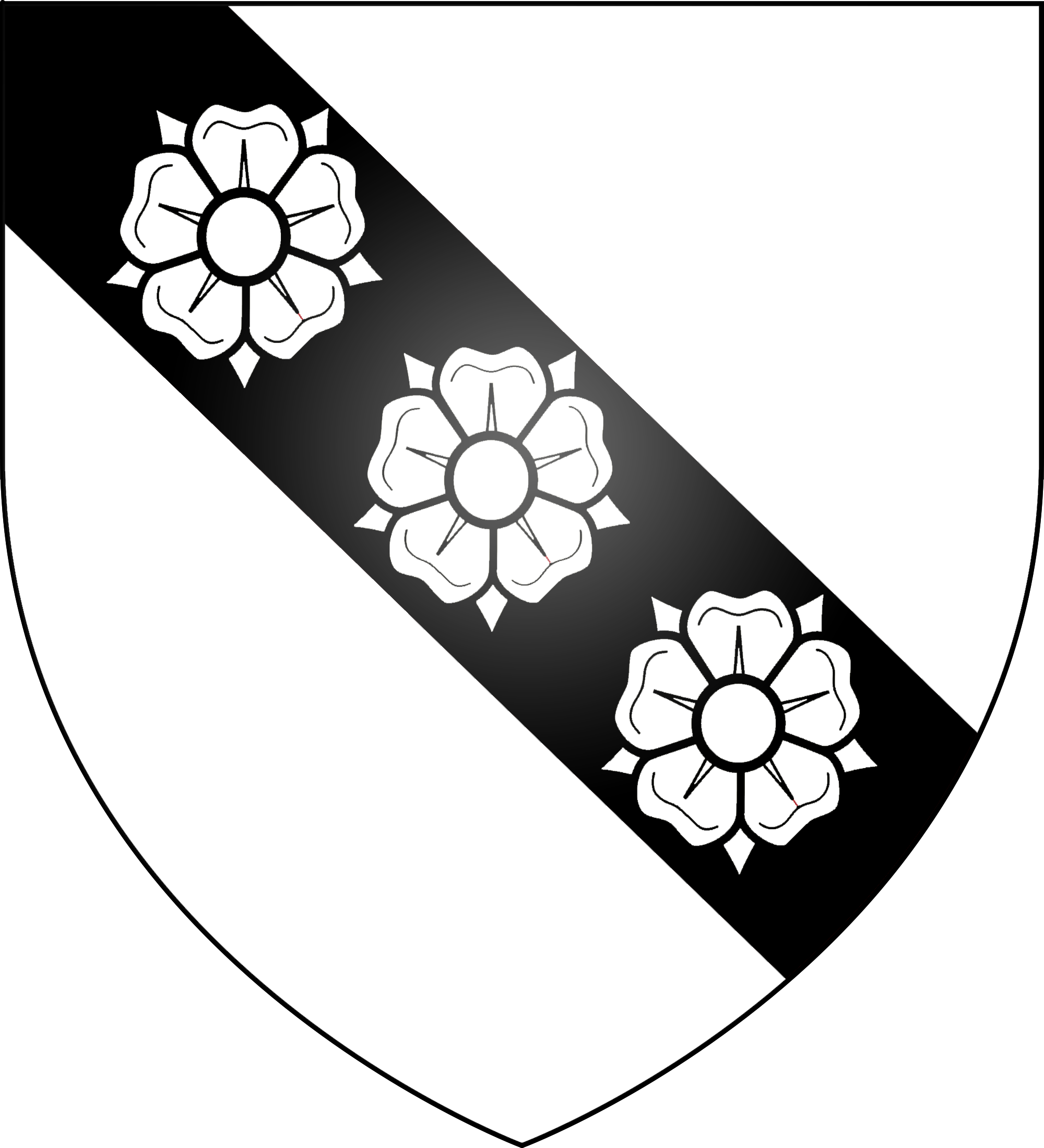
Arms of Cary: Argent, on a bend sable three roses of the field

Sir John Cary (died 28 May 1395), of Devon, was a judge who rose to the position of Chief Baron of the Exchequer (1386–88) and served twice as Member of Parliament for Devon, on both occasions together with his brother, Sir William Cary, in 1363/64 and 1368/69.

== Origins ==
He was a son of Sir John Cary and his second wife Jane Bryan, a daughter of Sir Guy Bryan (died 1349), who held Walwyn's Castle in Pembrokeshire and Torbryan in Devon, and sister of Guy Bryan, 1st Baron Bryan, KG (died 1390).

== Career ==
He served twice as Member of Parliament for Devon, on both occasions together with his brother Sir William Cary, in 1363/4 and 1368/9, and in November 1386 he was appointed Chief Baron of the Exchequer. He was a strong adherent to King Richard II (1377–1399) and was attainted in 1388 by the Merciless Parliament, at which many members of Richard II's court were convicted of treason. He was initially sentenced to death for his part in the "Nottingham judgements", but this was commuted to banishment to Ireland with a pension of £20. His landholdings and goods were thereupon forfeited to the Crown. He died in exile at Waterford, Ireland on 28 May 1395.

== Landholdings ==
Sir John Cary appears to have had his principal home at Cary, thought by some to be Castle Cary in Somerset but in fact at St Giles on the Heath in Devon, where the ancestral estate of Carey Barton continues in other hands. He purchased the manor of Clovelly, on the north coast of Devon, where a junior branch of his descendants was seated until 1739 when it was sold to Zachary Hamlyn (1677–1759) . His son and heir Robert Cary is generally stated to have been the first of the family seated at Cockington, on the south coast of Devon in Torbay. He also held a moiety of the manor of Great Torrington, Devon, possibly inherited from his heiress mother's family, de Bryan, which had inherited a one-fifth moiety of the feudal barony of Great Torrington from the Sully family.

Many of his forfeited lands in Somerset, including Hardington Mandeville, a moiety of Chilton Cantelo, and premises in Trent (now in Dorset) were sold by the crown in July 1389 for 600 marks, jointly to Sir John Wadham of Edge, Branscombe in Devon and Merryfield, Ilton, Somerset, Justice of the Common Pleas (1389–1398) and MP for Exeter in 1399 and for Devon in 1401, together with Sir William Hankford (c. 1350 – 1423) of Annery in the parish of Monkleigh in Devon, Chief Justice of the King's Bench. His son and heir Sir Robert Cary married as his second wife Jane Hankford, daughter of Sir William Hankford and, according to Vivian, the widow of Sir John Wadham, although the will of John Wadham does not appear to support Vivian's contention. The attainder was reversed in 1398.

== Marriage and children ==
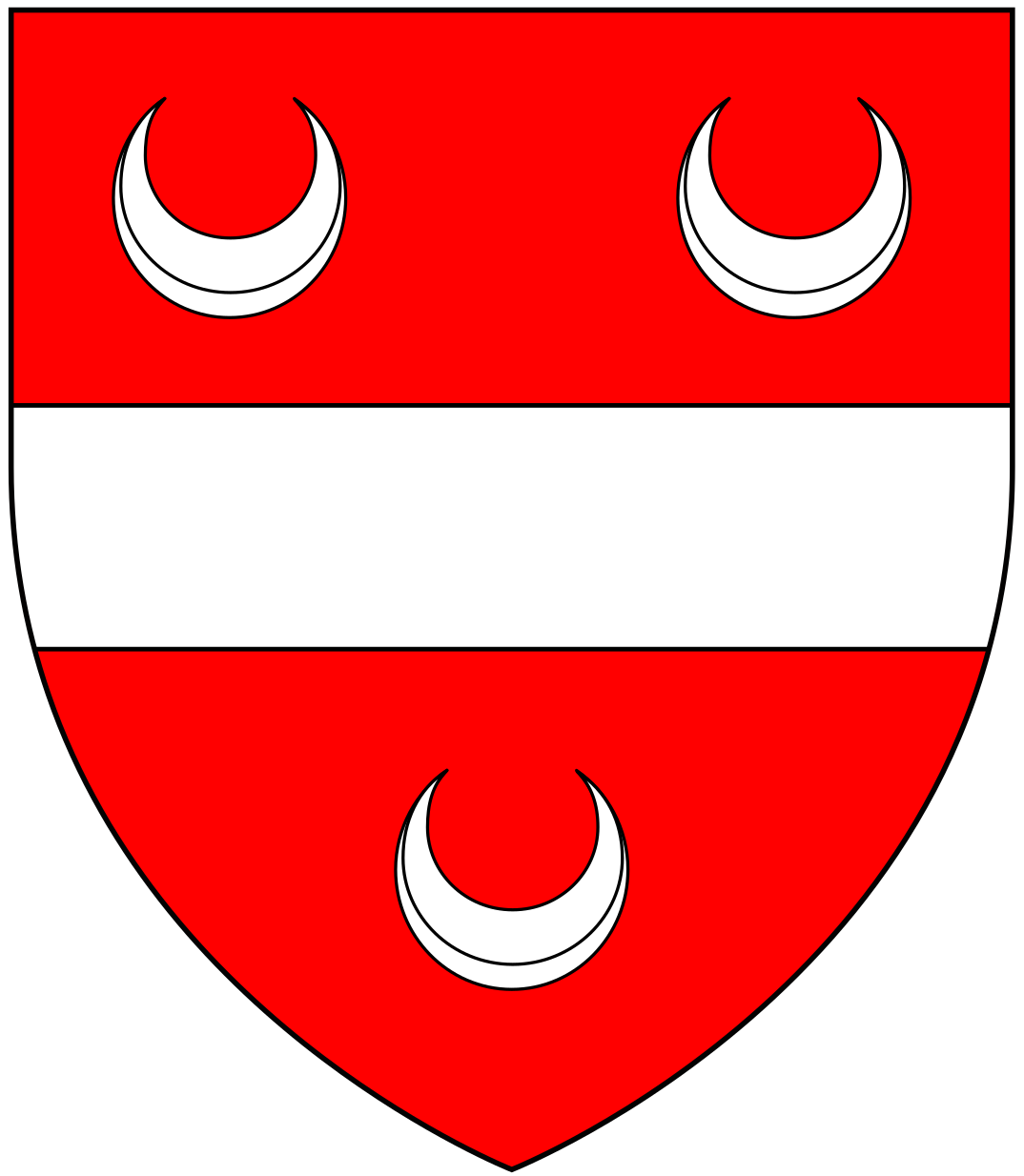
Arms of Holleway (alias Holway) of Holway: Gules, a fesse between three crescents argent

In 1376, he married Margaret Holway, daughter and heiress of Robert Holway,) of Holway in the parish of Northlew in Devon. The arms of "Holway of Holway" are Gules, a fesse between three crescents argent and appear quartered by Cary on the monument in Clovelly Church of Robert Cary (died 1587). Their children included three sons:

- Sir Robert Cary (died c. 1431) (eldest son and heir) of Cockington, Devon, twelve times MP for Devon.
- Thomas Cary.
- John Cary, believed (possibly erroneously) by the Cary family in 1620, when William Cary submitted his return for the Heraldic Visitation of Devon, to have been Bishop of Exeter in 1419. The name of this bishop, who died in 1419, is usually given as John Catterick (alias Ketterick, Keterich, etc.), and he had previously served as Bishop of St David's and Bishop of Coventry and Lichfield.

== Sources ==
- Prince, John, (1643–1723) The Worthies of Devon, 1810 edition, London, pp. 176–179, biography of Cary, Sir John, Knight
- Roskell, J.S., & Woodger, L.S., biography of his son: Cary, Robert (d.c.1431), of Cockington, Devon, published in History of Parliament: House of Commons 1386–1421, ed. J.S. Roskell, L. Clark, C. Rawcliffe., 1993
