= Thomas W. Pomeroy Jr. =

American judge

Associate Justice of the Supreme Court of Pennsylvania
- In office December 26, 1968 – November 18, 1978

Personal details
- Born: November 20, 1908 Crafton, Pennsylvania, U.S.
- Died: December 17, 2002 (aged 94) Pittsburgh, Pennsylvania, U.S.
- Education: Lafayette College (BA); Harvard Law School (LLB)
- Occupation: jurist

Thomas Wilson Pomeroy Jr. (November 20, 1908 – December 17, 2002) was an Associate Justice of the Supreme Court of Pennsylvania. His term started in 1968 and lasted until 1978, and he was nominated by Raymond Shafer.
