= Robert Cary (died c. 1431) =

Member of the Parliament of England

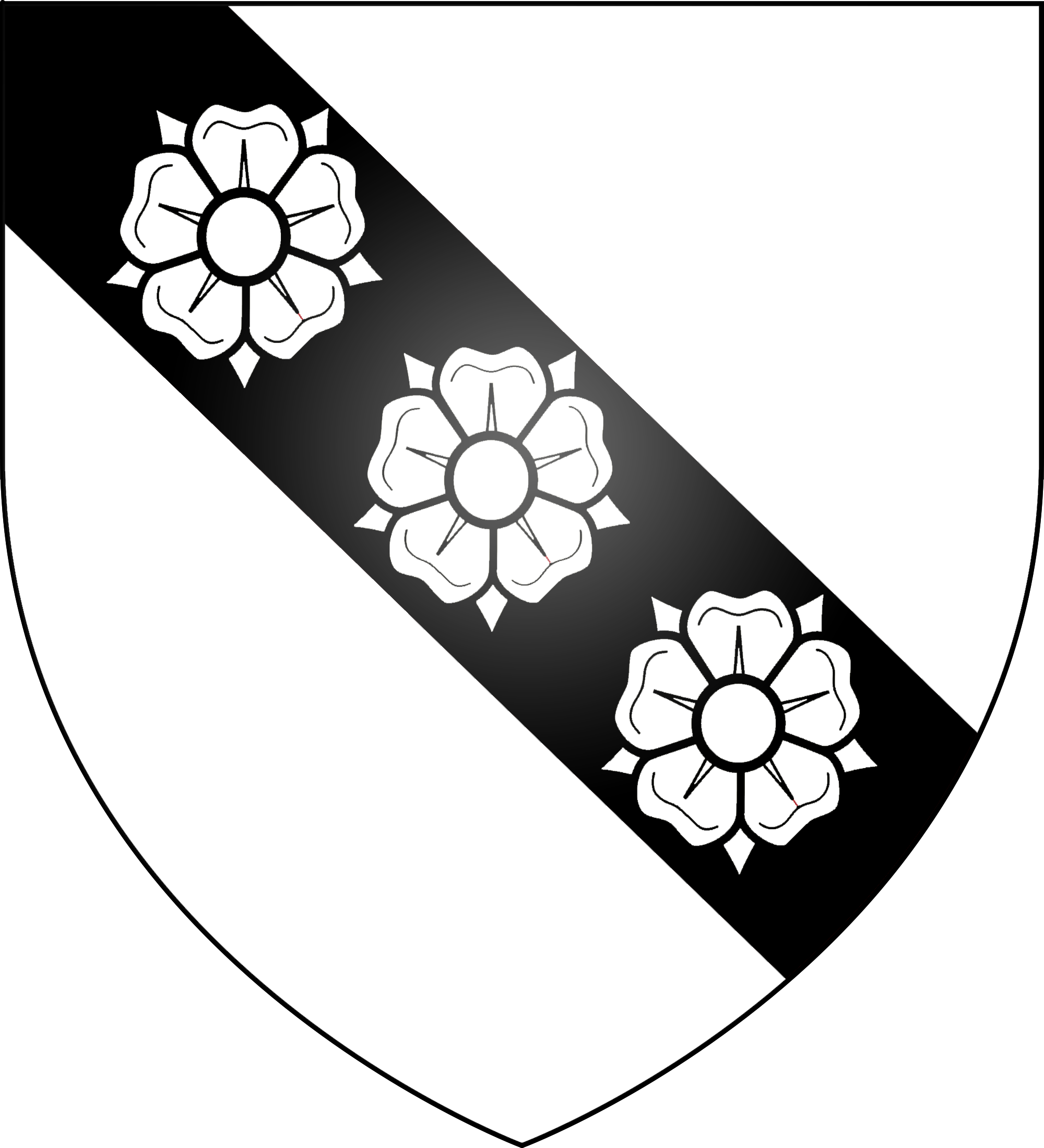
Arms of Cary: Argent, on a bend sable three roses of the field. Said by Prince (died 1723) to be the arms of the Aragonois knight errant vanquished by Sir Robert Cary in combat at Smithfield circa 1413

Sir Robert Cary (died c. 1431) of Cockington, Devon, was twelve times Member of Parliament for Devon, in 1407, 1410, 1411, May 1413, April 1414, Mar. 1416, 1417, 1419, May 1421, 1422, 1425 and 1426. Much of his later life was devoted to regaining the many estates and other landholdings forfeited to the crown following his father's attainder in 1388. He was an esquire in the households of King Richard II (1377–1399) and of the latter's half-brother John Holland, 1st Duke of Exeter (c. 1352 – 1400).

== Origins ==
He was the eldest son and heir of Sir John Cary (died 1395), Chief Baron of the Exchequer and twice Member of Parliament for Devon by his wife Margaret Holleway, daughter and heiress of Robert Holleway, of Holleway in the parish of North Lew, Devon. Due to his support for King Richard II against Henry Bolingbroke, in 1388 Sir John Cary was attainted by the Merciless Parliament, which resulted in his banishment to Ireland and the confiscation of his lands.

== Career ==
=== Supporter of King Richard II ===
Like his father he was a supporter of King Richard II (1377–1399), during the period of that king's reign when he was challenged by Henry Bolingbroke (later King Henry IV (1399–1413)). In 1391 he became an esquire in the household of King Richard II and in 1392 was also an esquire in the household of Richard's half-brother John Holland, 1st Duke of Exeter, 1st Earl of Huntingdon (c. 1352 – 1400). These connections helped to mitigate the effects of his father's attainder, and he received several grants of land from about 1392. The Parliament of 1398 annulled the Acts of the Merciless Parliament of 1388, and thus Robert Cary recovered some of his father's forfeited estates.

=== Career under King Henry IV ===
Following the deposing of King Richard by Bolingbroke in 1399, ruling as King Henry IV, the first Parliament of the new king reversed the Act of 1398 and reaffirmed the 1388 Act of the Merciless Parliament. Thus Cary's chances of recovering his paternal estates looked less favourable. Indeed, in 1399 his father's former estates were granted by Henry IV to Sir Robert Chalons, MP, a member of the royal household. Cary however resorted to physical violence against Chalons in an attempt to deny him possession of these estates, and in 1400 gave his support to the Epiphany Rising being planned by his patron John Holland, 1st Earl of Huntingdon, (now stripped of his dukedom) intended to effect the assassinate King Henry and his sons, and to return Richard, then in prison, to the throne. The revolt failed and in 1400 Holland was executed and Richard died in Pontefract Castle. Cary was declared by juries in Devon to have been guilty of participating in the plot, but managed to escape punishment. Indeed, in 1402 he recommenced his campaign for the recovery of his paternal lands. It appears that his return to royal favour was due to his first marriage in about 1402 and the influence of his brother-in-law Richard Courtenay (died 1415), Bishop of Norwich, a close friend and ally of the new king's son Henry of Monmouth, later King Henry V (1413–1422).

=== Career under King Henry V ===
On the accession of King Henry V in 1413, Cary returned fully to royal favour, it is said by tradition not only due to the influence of Richard Courtenay, but also due to his triumph in a feat of arms against a knight errant of Aragon which much impressed the new king.

==== Combat with Aragonois ====
According to Prince, relying on Richard Izacke (died 1698), at the beginning of the reign of King Henry V (1413–1422):

A certain knight-errand of Arragon, having passed thro' divers countries, and performed many feats of arms, to his high commendation, arrived here in England, where he challenged any man of his rank and quality to make tryal of his valor and skill in arms. This challenge Sir Robert Cary accepted; between whom a cruel encounter and a long and doubtful combat was waged, in Smithfield, London. But at length this noble champion vanquished the presumptious Arragonoise, for which King Henry V restored unto him good part of his father's lands, which for his loyalty to King Richard II he had been deprived of by King Henry IV, and authoriz'd him to bear the arms of the knight of Arragon, viz: in a field silver, on a bend sable three white roses, which the noble posterity of this gentleman continue to wear unto this day, for according to the laws of heraldry whosoever fairly in the field conquers his adversary may justify the bearing of his arms.

==== Later career ====
In 1413 he was appointed Escheator of Devon and Cornwall, which office he retained until 1415. In 1415 he loaned 100 marks to the crown to help the financing of the expedition to Normandy, and received as security (from his brother-in-law Bishop Courtenay, Keeper of the King's Jewels) the Duke of Bergundy's great tabernacle. In December 1415 Richard Courtenay, who by then had inherited Powderham and other estates following the death of his father, died at the Siege of Harfleur, leaving his 11-year-old nephew Philip Courtenay (1404–1463) as his heir. Cary was granted by the king the farm of the lucrative wardship of 16 of the bishop's manors in Devon and Somerset until the heir should attain his majority of 21.

== Military career ==
During the reign of King Henry V (1413–1422) Cary served on Commissions of Array to raise royal troops in Devon, and on commissions to take the musters of the army of the Seneschal of Aquitaine.

== Marriages and children ==
Arms of Courtenay of Powderham: Or, three torteaux a label azure

Cary married twice. His first wife was Margaret Courtenay, a daughter of Sir Philip Courtenay (1340–1406), of Powderham, Devon, son of Hugh Courtenay, 2nd Earl of Devon (1303–1377) by his wife Margaret de Bohun (died 1391), daughter and heiress of Humphrey de Bohun, 4th Earl of Hereford (1298–1322) by his wife Elizabeth, a daughter of King Edward I. Her eldest brother was Richard Courtenay (died 1415), Bishop of Norwich, a close friend and ally of Henry of Monmouth, later King Henry V, who did much to restore Robert Cary to royal favour after his father's attainder. By his first wife Cary had one son, Sir Philip Cary (died 1437), MP for Devon in 1433.

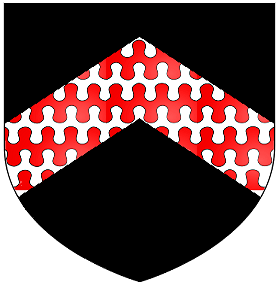
Arms of Hankford: Sable, a chevron barry nebuly argent and gules

His second wife was Jane Hankford (died 1447) a daughter of Sir William Hankford (c. 1350 – 1423) of Annery in the parish of Monkleigh in Devon, Chief Justice of the King's Bench. By Jane, Cary had one daughter, Jane, who became the first wife of William Ayshford of Ayshford in the parish of Burlescombe, Devon, who died without children.

== Death ==
The date of his death is unknown, but probably occurred in 1431, after which there is no mention of his name in surviving records. Furthermore, it is likely he died before his son was elected MP for Devon in 1433.

== Landholdings ==
Robert Cary's landholdings included the following manors:

- Cockington, Devon, purchased by his father.
- Clovelly, Devon, purchased by his father.
- Great Torrington (2/5 moiety of), apparently inherited from the de Bryan family, heirs of the de Sully family, which had inherited 1/5 of the feudal barony of Great Torrington. Also the advowson of the parish church and chapel in the castle. All sold by Robert Cary to Sir Robert Chalons.
- Puncknowle, Dorset (farm of)
- Puddington, Devon
- North Lew, Devon (2/3rds of) (in which parish was Holway, his mother's inheritance)
- Woodrow, Wiltshire (grant for life in 1397)
- Calne, Wiltshire (grant for life in 1397)
- Ellingham Priory, Hampshire (grant for life in 1397)
- Powderham, Devon, in 1413 granted to him for life by Bishop Richard Courtenay.
- Chivelstone, Devon, in 1413 granted to him for life by Bishop Richard Courtenay.
- Many rents from various manors and messuages.

== Sources ==
- Roskell, J.S., & Woodger, L.S., biography of Cary, Robert (d.c.1431), of Cockington, Devon, published in History of Parliament: House of Commons 1386-1421, ed. J.S. Roskell, L. Clark, C. Rawcliffe., 1993
- Roskell, John Smith, The Commons in the Parliament of 1422, pp. 161–2, Robert Cary
- Prince, John, (1643–1723) The Worthies of Devon, 1810 edition, London, pp. 176–179, biography of Cary, Sir John, Knight
