= Thomas Archdeacon (junior) =

English politician (c.1380–1421)

Thomas Archdeacon (c. 1380 – 4 February 1421) was an English politician. He sat as MP for Devon in 1420.

He also served as commissioner to raise royal loans in Devon in January 1420.

He was the son and heir of Richard Archedeacon (the younger brother of Sir Warin Archdeacon) and Joan Bosom. He married a woman called Joan and had two sons and one daughter.
