= Cadhay =

Historic estate in Devon, England

Coordinates: 50.7585°N 3.2926°W

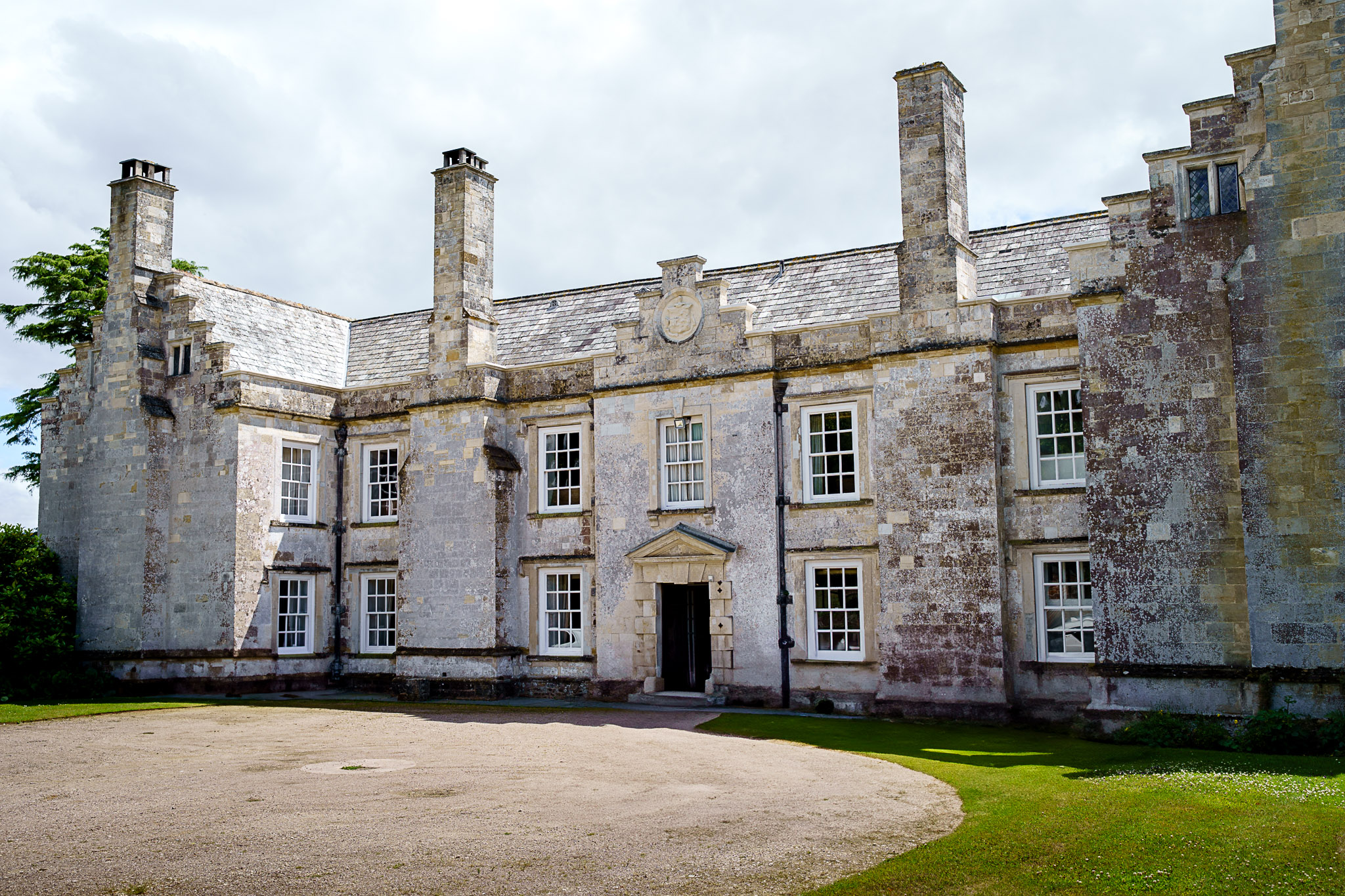
Cadhay House, north front, rebuilt in the Georgian style

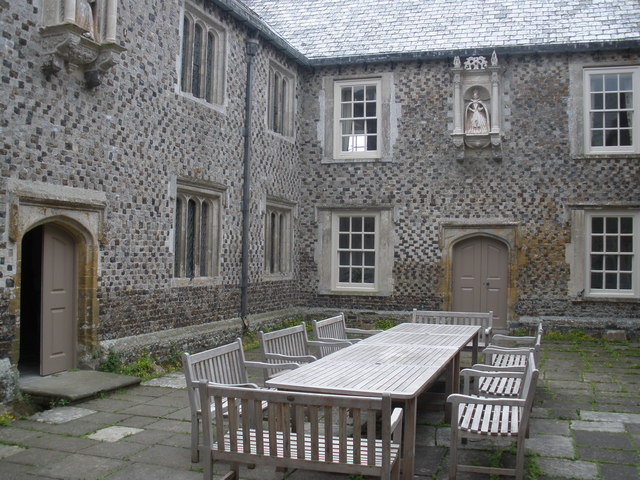
Courtyard of Cadhay House, with statues of Tudor monarchs in niches

Cadhay is an historic estate in the parish of Ottery St Mary in Devon, England, 10 miles (16 km) east of Exeter and 5 miles (8 km) from the sea at Sidmouth. The mansion house known as Cadhay House, 1 mile (2 km) north-west of Ottery St Mary village, is a grade I listed Elizabethan building.

== History and description ==
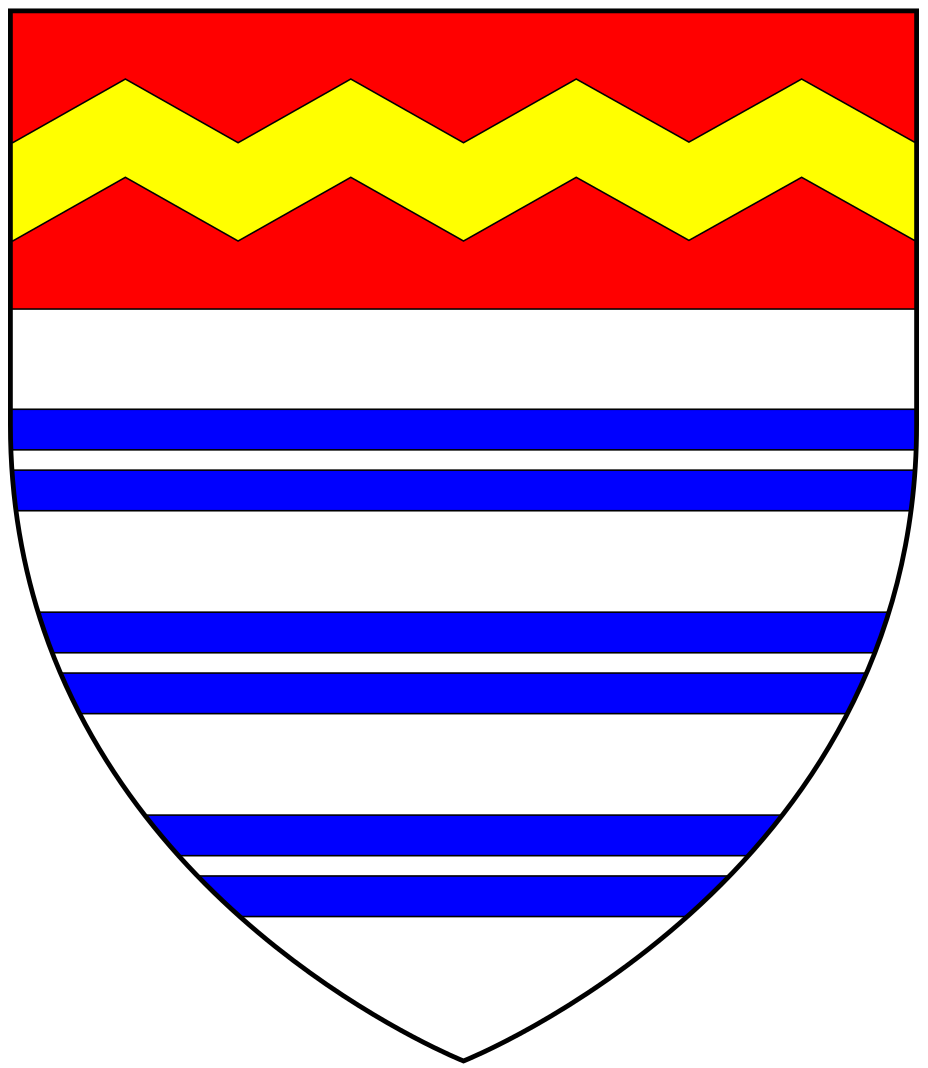
Arms of Haydon: Argent, three bars gemels azure on a chief gules a fess dansettée or

The house stands around a central courtyard within extensive grounds. It was built in 1550 by John Haydon (d.1587), a bencher of Lincoln's Inn, the second son of Richard Haydon (d.1533) of Bowood, Ebford (in the parish of Woodbury), Lympstone and Woodbury in Devon, Mayor of Barnstaple and deputy steward of the Devon lands of the Duchy of Cornwall, whose armorials (Argent, three bars gemeles azure on a chief gules a fess dansettée or) survive on a capital in St Swithin's Church in Woodbury, Devon, where survives the canopy for his intended monument.

John Haydon's brother was George Haydon (c.1517-1558), of Hornshayne in the parish of Farway, Devon, MP for Barnstaple, Devon, in 1545. John Haydon had married Joan Grenvill (d.1592), heiress of Cadhay, whose family had inherited it from the de Cadhay family some generations before. The couple's Easter Sepulchre monument survives in Ottery St Mary Church. John Haydon was the first Governor of the Collegiate Church of Ottery St Mary following the Dissolution of the Monasteries. He died without progeny and bequeathed it to his great-nephew Robert Haydon (1560–1626), the eldest son of his nephew Thomas Haydon of Bowood and Epforde, and the husband of Joan Paulet (d.1630), a daughter of Sir Amias Paulet (1532–1588), Governor of Jersey and gaoler for a period of Mary, Queen of Scots.

It was built on the site of an earlier house, the great hall of which, dating back to 1420, was retained. His great-nephew Robert Haydon subsequently added a long gallery, a feature of late 16th century housebuilding, which closed in the south side of the house to form a courtyard. The residents of the Manor House have had a long association with the parish church of Ottery.

By 1737 the house was in a poor state of repair and the new owner, Peere Williams, restored the house in the Georgian style. He blocked up most of the Tudor hearths and panelled a number of the rooms. He inserted a ceiling in the Great Hall under the magnificent oak-timbered roof to form the present dining room and roof chamber.

During the 18th and 19th centuries the house was at times divided into two and again fell into a poor state of repair. It was bought by Dampier Whetham in 1910 who uncovered the old Tudor hearths and put the house into sound structural condition. In the 1920s he let the house to the William-Powlett family, descendants of Amias Paulet, who purchased the property in 1935, and occupied it until 2002.

In 2002 the house was inherited by Rupert Thistlethwayte, a nephew of the last of the William-Powletts, and a furniture maker. He restored it to its previous splendour and introduced modern comforts such as heating and additional bathrooms, as well as contemporary furniture of his own designs to complement the antique furniture. Sir Simon Jenkins in his book England's Thousand Best Homes described the house thus: "The courtyard...with statues of Henry VIII and his three monarch offspring, Edward, Mary and Elizabeth...is one of the treasures of Devon."

== Statues ==
Four statues dating from 1617 survive, standing over the doors in the courtyard, and represent Kings Henry VIII and Edward VI, and Queens Mary I and Elizabeth I.
