= John Yarde-Buller =

John Yarde-Buller may refer to:

- John Yarde-Buller, 1st Baron Churston (1799 – 1871), British politician
- John Yarde-Buller, 2nd Baron Churston (1846 – 1910), British peer and soldier
- John Yarde-Buller, 3rd Baron Churston (1873 – 1930), British peer and soldier
- John Buller (cricketer) (1823 – 1867), English cricketer and British Army officer

== See also ==
- Joan Yarde-Buller (1908 – 1997), English socialite
- John Buller (disambiguation)
