= Denise Orme =

English music hall singer, actress and musician

Her Grace The Duchess of Leinster
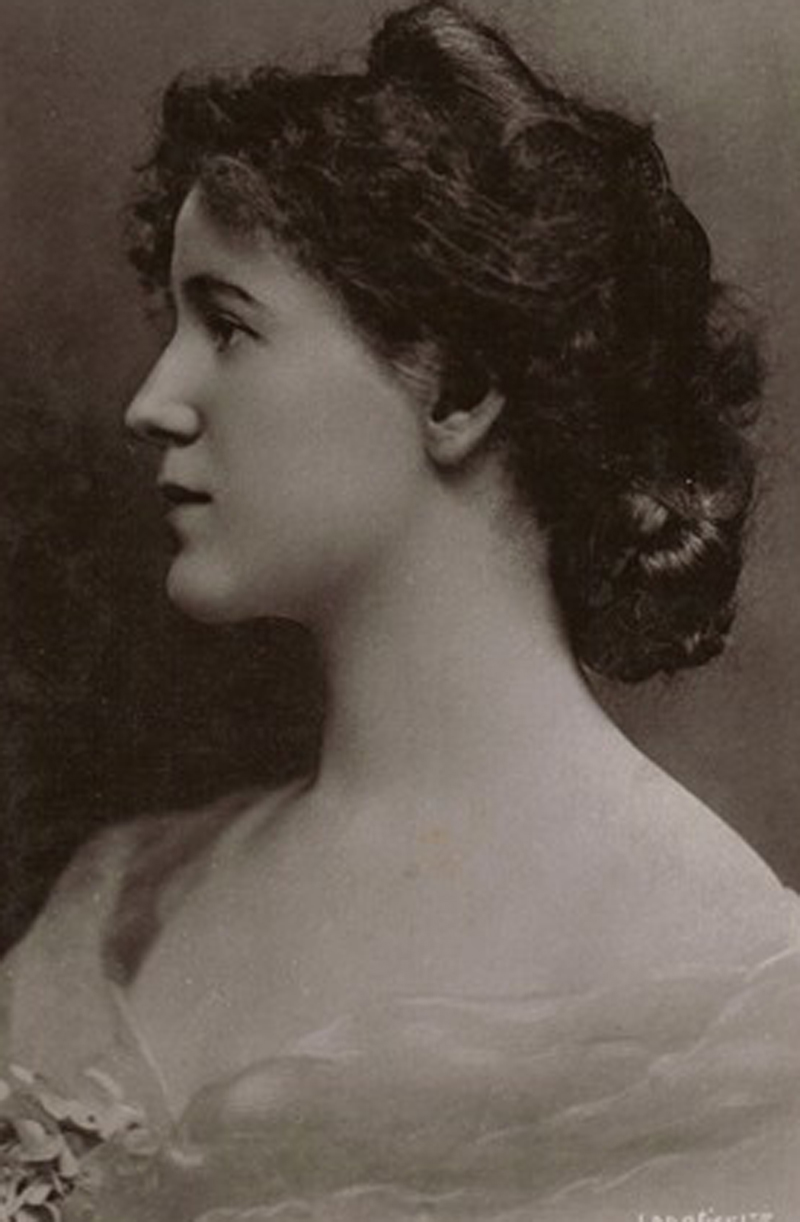
- Orme, c. 1905

Personal details
- Born: Jessie Smither; 25 August 1885
- Died: 20 October 1960 (aged 75) London, England
- Spouses: John Yarde-Buller, 3rd Baron Churston (m. 1907; div. 1928) Tito Wessel (m. 1928; div. 1934) Edward FitzGerald, 7th Duke of Leinster (m. 1946)
- Children: Joan Yarde-Buller; Richard Yarde-Buller, 4th Baron Churston; John Reginald Henry; Denise Grosvenor, Baroness Ebury; Lydia Russell, Duchess of Bedford; Primrose Cadogan, Countess Cadogan; Hugo Wessel
- Relatives: Aga Khan IV (grandson); Amyn Aga Khan (grandson); Charles Cadogan, 8th Earl Cadogan (grandson); John Yarde-Buller, 5th Baron Churston (grandson)
- Education: Royal Academy of Music; Royal College of Music

Jessie Smither, Duchess of Leinster (25 August 1885 – 20 October 1960), known by her stage name Denise Orme, was an English music hall singer, actress and musician who appeared regularly at the Alhambra and Gaiety Theatres in London in the early years of the 20th century. Married, successively, to an English baron, a Danish millionaire, and an Irish duke, she was the maternal grandmother of Aga Khan IV.

== Early life ==
The daughter of Alfred John Smither, a servant working for lawyers, and Jessicah Henrietta Pococke, she studied at the Royal Academy of Music (where she won the Wessely Violin Exhibition in 1899) and later the Royal College of Music where she was 'discovered' as a singer by George Edwardes.

Her cousin Ethel Rose Kendall, who acted under the name Eileen Orme, married the Hon. Maurice Nelson Hood in 1908. He was the son and heir of the second Viscount Bridport (who was also the 5th Duke of Bronte).

== Career ==
Orme's first stage appearance was in 1905 in the chorus of The Little Michus at Daly's Theatre in London, later taking the role of Marie-Blanche in that production, and in 1906 the same year, she appeared in the title role of See-See, composed by Sydney Jones, at the Prince of Wales Theatre. Also in 1906, she also participated in gramophone recording of Gilbert and Sullivan's The Mikado, singing part of the role of Yum-Yum. She appeared in The Merveilleuses into early 1907. After the birth of her first daughter, she returned to the stage in The Hon'ble Phil in October 1908, and as Lady Elizabeth Thanet in Our Miss Gibbs at the Gaiety Theatre, London. She retired from the stage in 1910 when her husband acceded to the baronetcy.

In the 1940s, Orme owned and operated the Beech Hill hotel at Rushlake Green in Sussex, England.

== Personal life ==
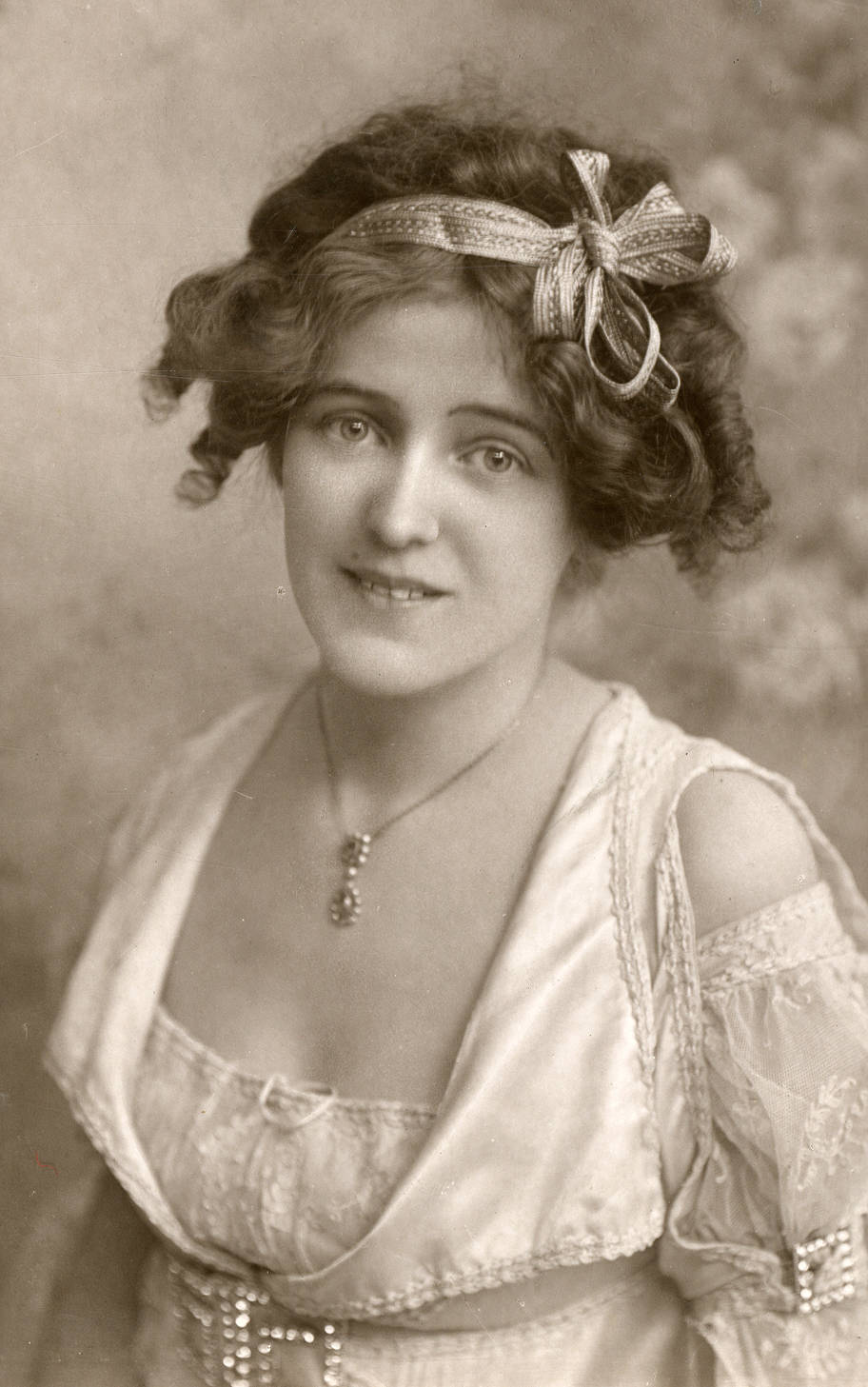
Orme, 1907

Orme was married three times. Her first husband was John Reginald Lopes Yarde-Buller, 3rd Baron Churston (1873–1930), whom she married on 24 April 1907. He was the only son of the John Yarde-Buller, 2nd Baron Churston and Barbara Yelverton (the only child of Sir Hastings Yelverton and the 20th Baroness Grey de Ruthyn). Before their divorce in 1928 due to her affair with Theodore W. Wessel, they had six children:

- Joan Barbara Yarde-Buller (1908–1997), who married Thomas Loel Guinness in 1927. They divorced in 1936 and she married Prince Aly Khan in 1936. They divorced in 1949 and she married Seymour Berry, 2nd Viscount Camrose in 1986.
- Richard Francis Roger Yarde-Buller, 4th Baron Churston (1910–1991), who married three times, including to actress Sandra Storme, whom Orme introduced to her son.
- Hon. John Reginald Henry Yarde-Buller (1915–1962), a soldier who married Guendolen Osborn Roots, daughter of Rev. Charles Roots, in 1939.
- Denise Margaret Yarde-Buller (1916–2005), who married (as his second wife) Robert Grosvenor, 5th Baron Ebury; they had four children together and were divorced in 1954.
- Lydia Yarde-Buller (1917–2006), who married Capt. Ian Archibald de Hoghton Lyle (1909–1942), heir to a baronetcy. Five years after his death, she married, as his second wife, John Russell, 13th Duke of Bedford in 1947; they divorced in 1960.
- Primrose Yarde-Buller (1918–1970), who married William Cadogan, 7th Earl Cadogan; they divorced in 1960.

On 31 October 1928, she married Theodor Wilhelm "Tito" Wessel (1889–1948) in London. Wessel was a Danish millionaire and one-time Danish chargé d'affaires in Chile and by this marriage, she had three stepchildren, Barbara, Frederika, and Nina. Before their divorce in Tahiti in 1934, they were the parents of one son, Hugo Wessel (1930–2012), a businessman and the first husband of Nina Van Pallandt.

In the late 1930s, Orme had an affair with Esmé Ivo Bligh, 9th Earl of Darnley. On 11 March 1946, she married, as his third wife, Edward FitzGerald, 7th Duke of Leinster, Ireland's Premier Peer of the Realm.

Orme died in London on 20 October 1960. Bankrupt, the Duke remarried Vivien Irene Conner, a waitress, in 1965 before his death by suicide by taking an overdose of pentobarbital on 8 March 1976.

=== Descendants ===
Through her eldest daughter, she was a grandmother to Aga Khan IV and Prince Amyn Aga Khan. Through her youngest daughter Primrose, she was a grandmother to four, including Charles Cadogan, 8th Earl Cadogan. Through her youngest son Hugo, she was a grandmother to the Danish photographer Mark Wessel (b. 1963).
