= Lupton, Brixham =

Historic manor in Devon, England

Coordinates: 50.3847°N 3.5449°W

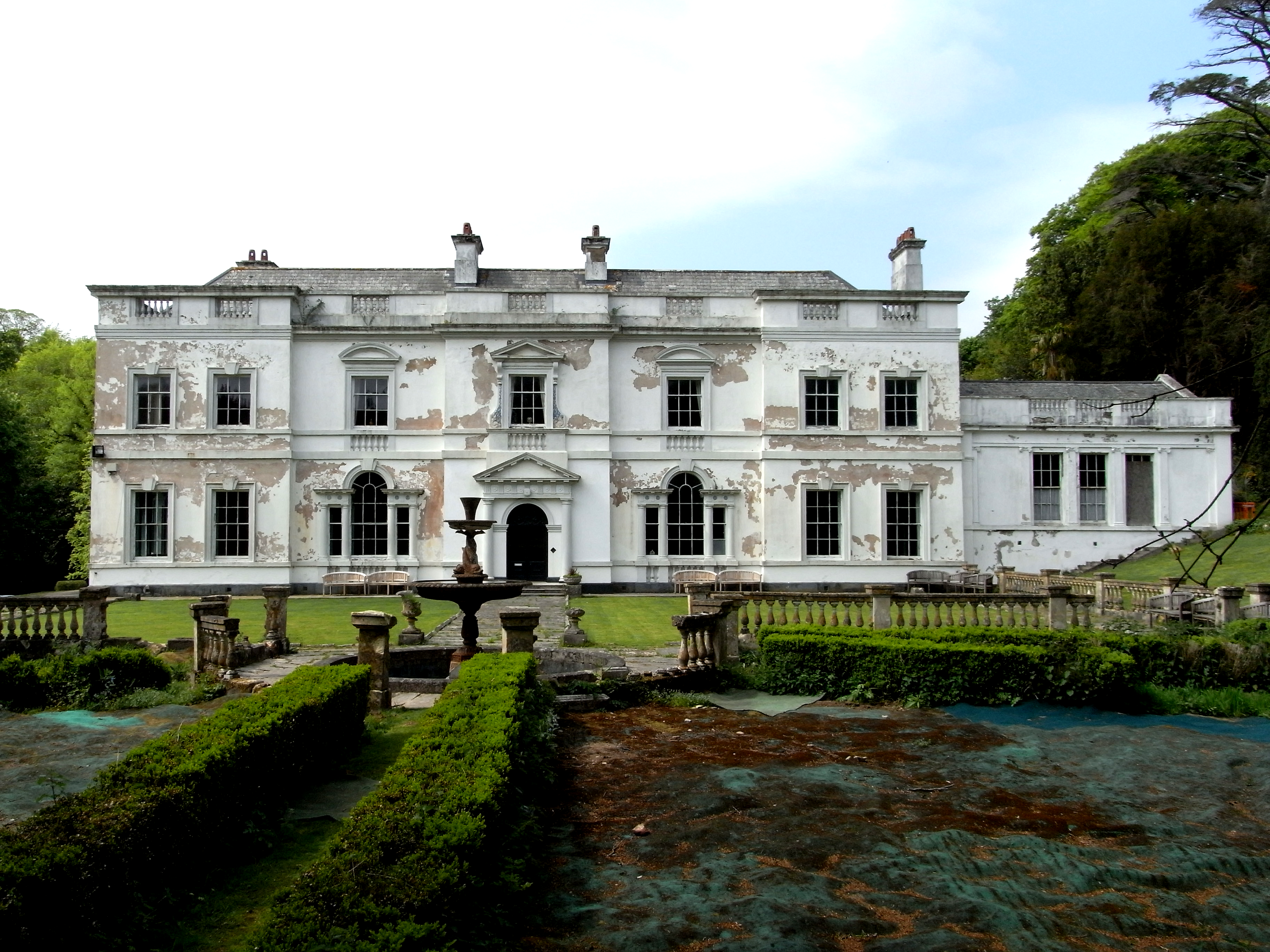
Lupton House, built by Charles II Hayne (1747–1821), Sheriff of Devon in 1772 and Colonel of the North Devon Militia. Palladian south front, original entrance front, viewed in 2013, still "sadly derelict", wings now missing Palladian gables visible in 1793 Swete watercolour (see below). Derelict formal garden in foreground

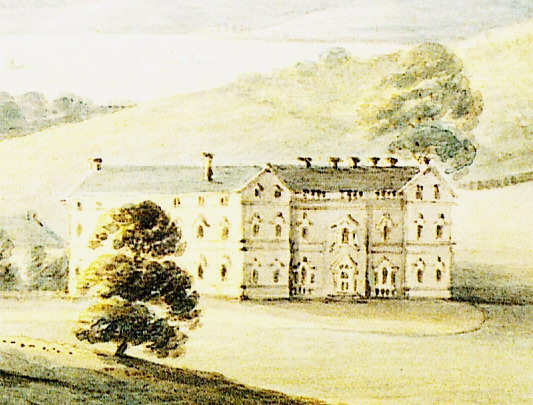
"Lupton, seat of Sir Francis Buller", 1793 watercolour, view from south-west, by Rev John Swete. The Palladian gables topping both wings of the south front are now missing

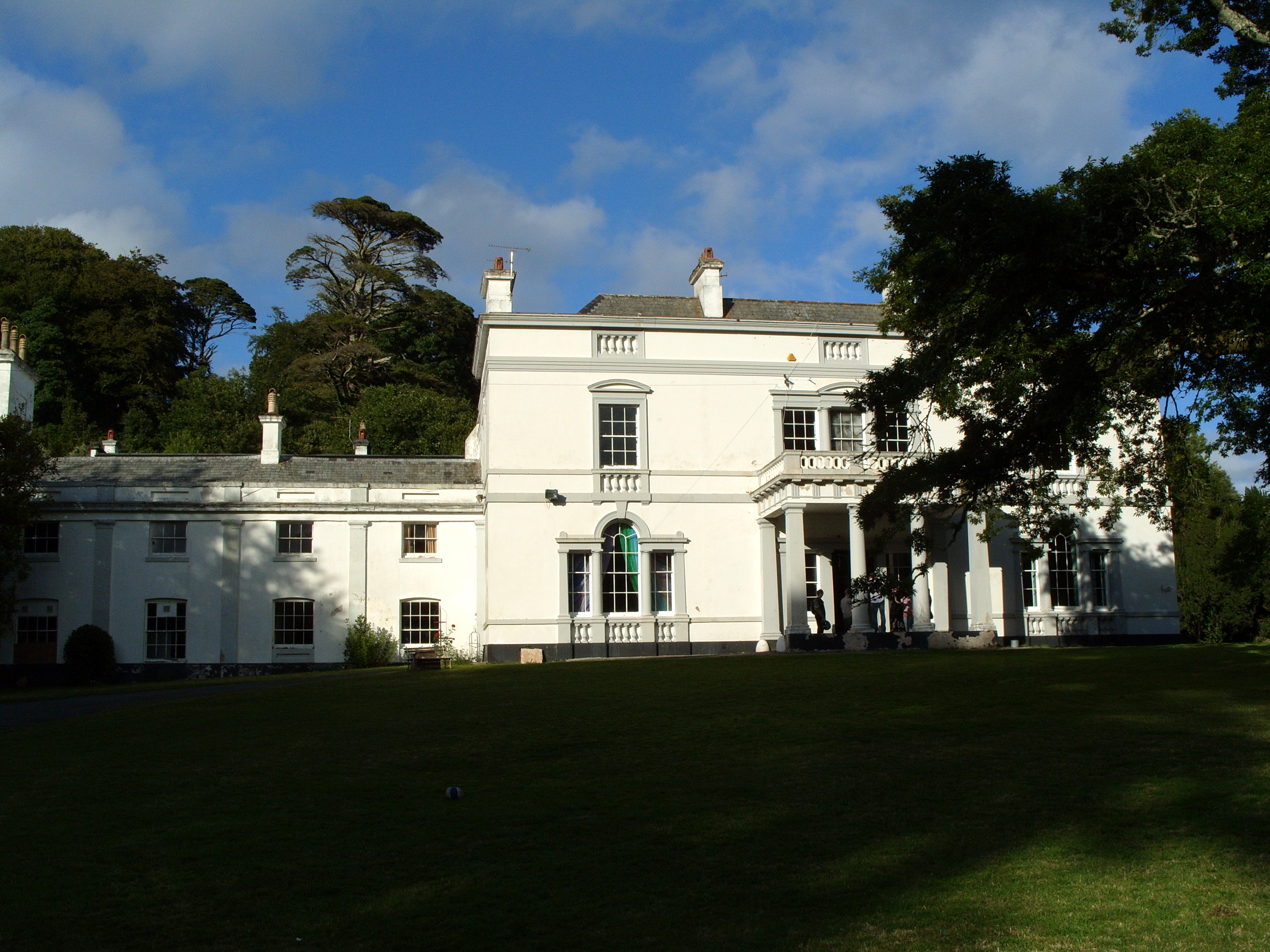
West front, remodelled c.1840 to design of George Wightwick to form new main entrance with porte cochere

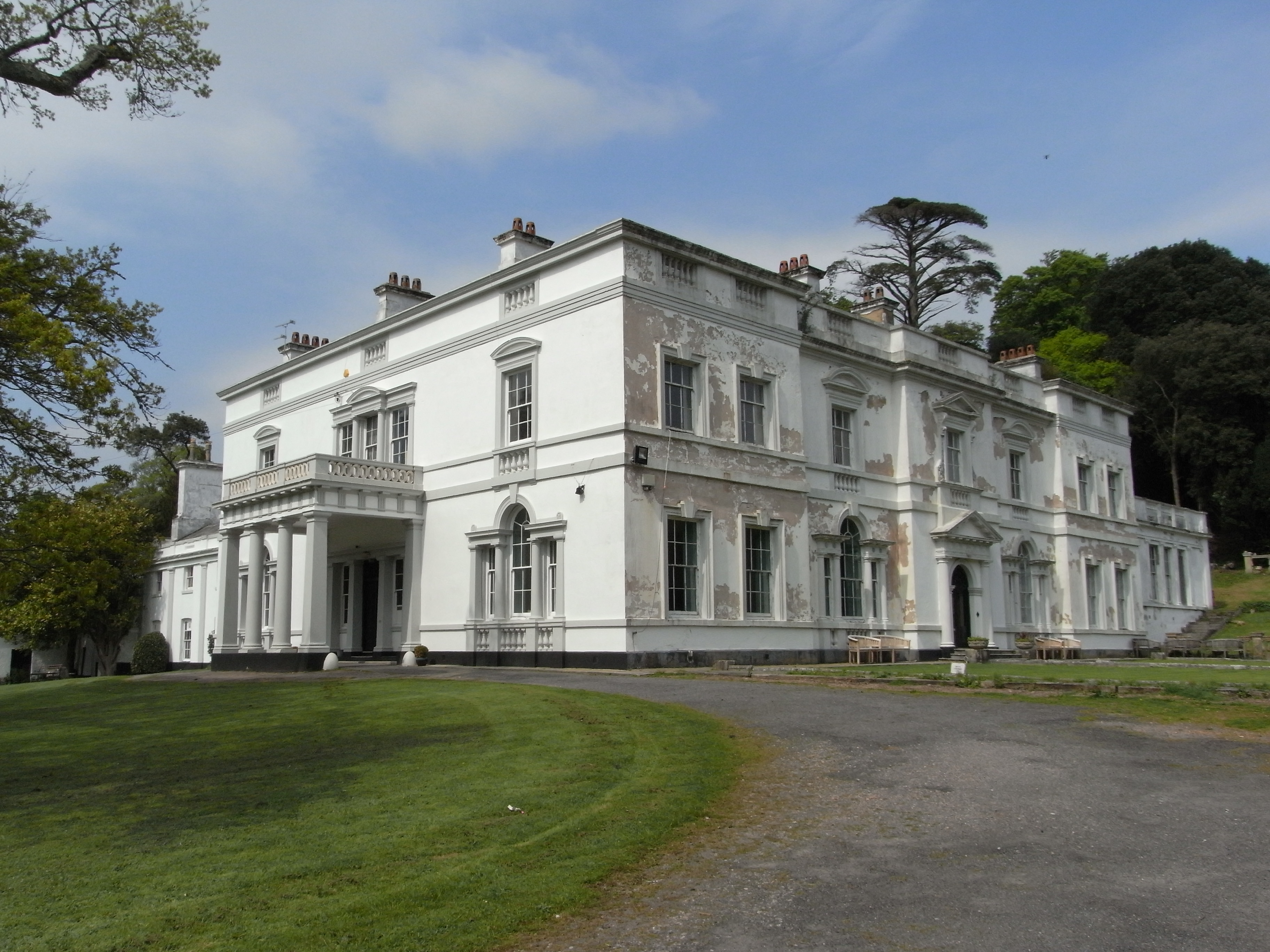
Lupton House, view from west, left: west front; right: south front

Lupton is an historic manor in the parish of Brixham, Devon. The surviving manor house known as Lupton House, is a Palladian Country house built by Charles II Hayne (1747–1821), Sheriff of Devon in 1772 and Colonel of the North Devon Militia. It received a Grade II* listing in 1949. The park and gardens are Grade II* listed in the National Register of Historic Parks and Gardens.

At some time before 1792 it was sold by Charles II Hayne, who had only lived in his new house for about twenty years, to the judge Sir Francis Buller, 1st Baronet (1746–1800), of nearby Churston Court, which he let to a tenant. Judge Buller had another residence, on bleak Dartmoor, known as Prince Hall, where he was a pioneer of moorland reclamation. In about 1840 the house was remodelled in the neo-classical style by his grandson, Sir John Yarde-Buller, 3rd Baronet (1799–1871; created Baron Churston of Churston Ferrers and Lupton in 1858), to the designs of George Wightwick. In 1862 further alterations, since demolished, were made to the designs of Anthony Salvin, who in 1826 had designed Mamhead House for the first baron's father-in-law, Sir Robert William Newman.

== Descent of the manor ==
=== Domesday Book ===
The manor of Lupton was listed as Lochetone in the Domesday Book of 1087 and formed one of the 107 Devonshire holdings of Juhel of Totnes, within his feudal barony of Totnes. Before the Norman Conquest of 1066 it was held by the Saxon Otre (Othere).

=== Peverell/Pennells ===
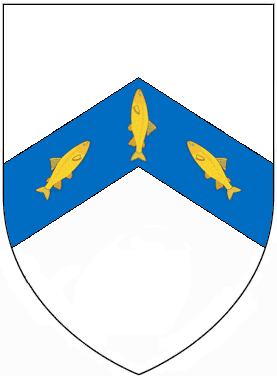
Arms of "Peniles of Luckton" (sic), according to Sir William Pole (d.1635): Argent, on a chevron azure three fishes or.

Lupton later became a seat of the Peverell family, which according to the Devon historian Tristram Risdon (d. 1640) occupied it for ten generations. Pole (d.1635) called this family "Peniles" of "Luckton (which) lieth in this parish of Brixham". Vivian (1895) called them "Pennells". John Peverell (alias Pennells, Peniles, etc.) was the last of the male line and his heir was his sister, Agnes Peverell (or Pennells, etc.), wife of John Upton of Puslinch, the descendants from which marriage thus inherited the manor. Pole gave the arms of "Peniles of Luckton" as "Argent, on a chevron azure three fishes or". These arms are visible as the 4th of 8 quarterings of the arms of Sir William Strode (1562–1637) of Newnham on his mural monument in St Mary's Church, Plympton St Mary.

=== Upton ===
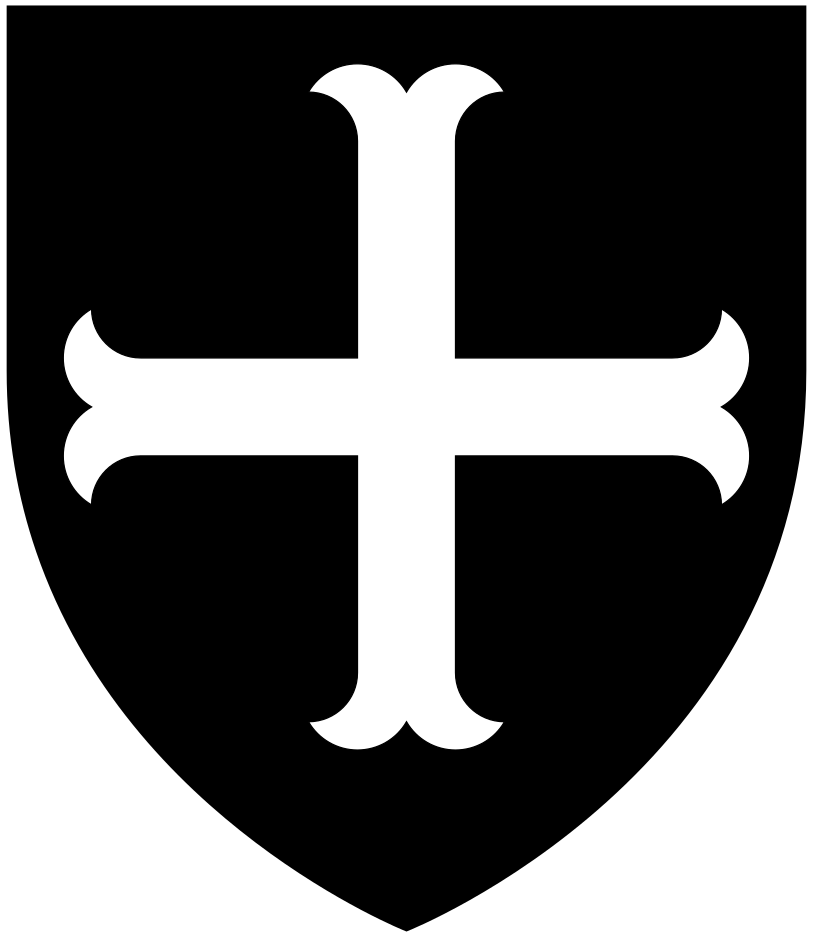
Arms of Upton: Sable, a cross moline argent

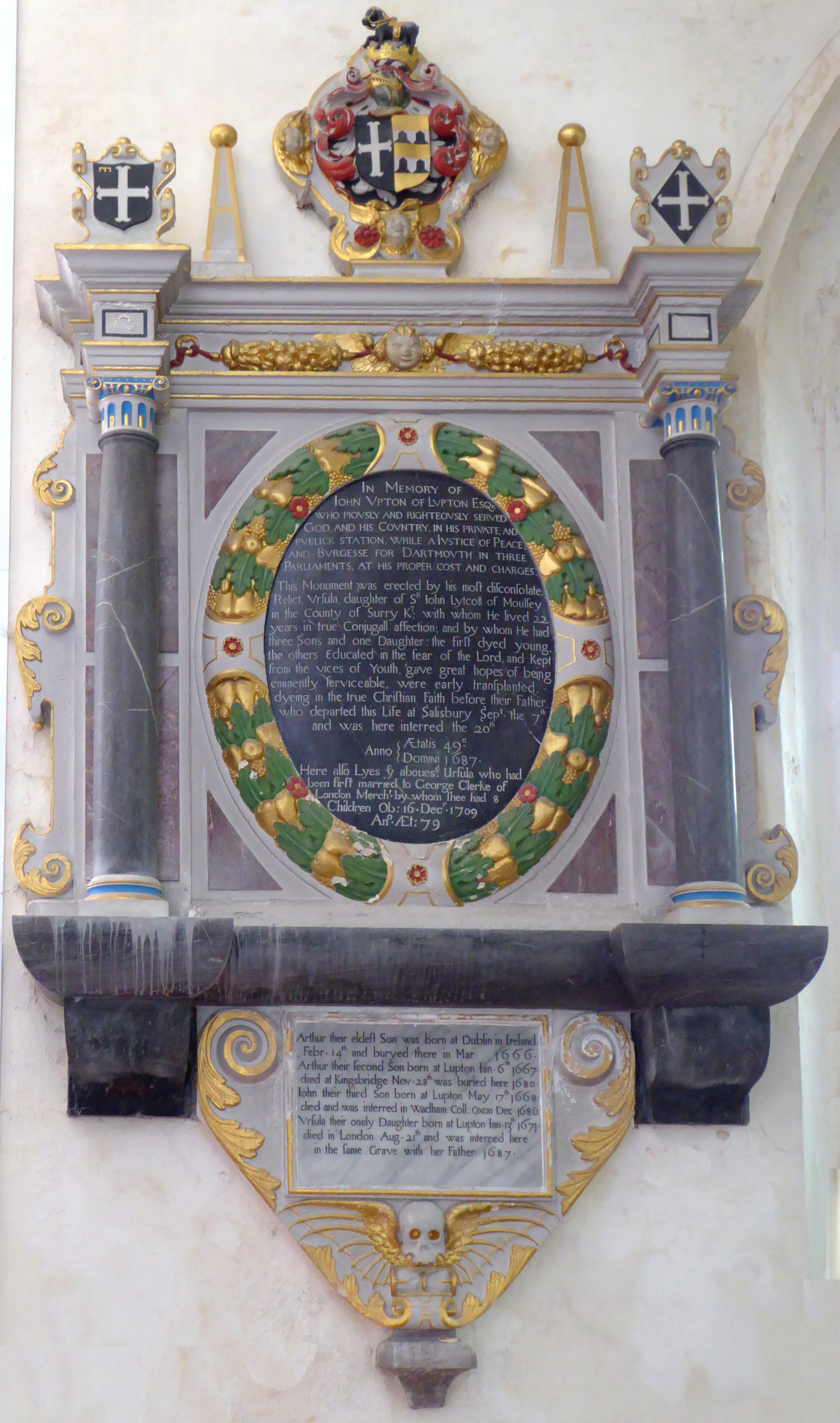
Mural monument to John Upton (1639-1687), Member of Parliament, in St Mary's Church, Brixham

The ancient family of Upton originated at the Cornish manor of Upton. A notable member of this family was Nicholas Upton (1400? – 1457), English cleric, precentor of Salisbury, and writer on heraldry and the art of war.

- John Upton of Puslinch, Devon, married Agnes Peverell (or Pennells), heiress of Lupton.
- William Upton (son), married Joan Punt, daughter of John Punt of Derby.
- John Upton (d.1582), son, married Johana Raleigh, a daughter of Wymond Raleigh of Fardell in the parish of Cornwood, Devon, and an aunt of Sir Walter Raleigh (c.1554-1618), the famous explorer.
- John Upton (d. 1600), son, married Anne Cooper (d. 1573), daughter of Cooper of Somerset.
- Arthur Upton (son), married in 1585 Gertrude Fortescue (d. 1598) of Filleigh.
- John Upton (1590-1641; 3rd surviving son and heir), MP for Dartmouth, married in 1613 Dorothy Rous (or Rowse) (d. 1644), a daughter of Sir Anthony Rous (c. 1555–1620), MP, of Halton Barton (one of Cornwall's richest residents)and sister of Francis Rous (1579-1659), MP and theologian.
- Arthur Upton (1614-1662) (son), a Member of Parliament for Devon in 1654 and 1656 during the Protectorate of Oliver Cromwell. In 1638 he married Elizabeth Gould (d. 1685), daughter of William Gould of Floyer Hayes in the parish of St Thomas, Exeter, and widow of Robert Haydon (1604-1634) of Cadhay in the parish of Ottery St Mary, Devon.
- John Upton (1639-1687), son, an MP for Dartmouth, who married Ursula Lytcott (d.1709), a daughter of Sir John Lytcott (died c.1645), of East Molesey in Surrey and widow of George Clerk of the City of London, merchant. She erected a monument to her husband in St Mary's Church, Brixham, which survives. They had 3 sons two of whom died as infants, and one daughter who died aged 16, all of whom predeceased their father:
  - Arthur I Upton (1666-1666), died an infant.
  - Arthur II Upton (1667-1680), died an infant.
  - John Upton (1668-1686), died aged 18 at Wadham College, Oxford.
  - Ursula Upton (1671-1687), died aged 16, 17 days before her father.

=== Hayne ===
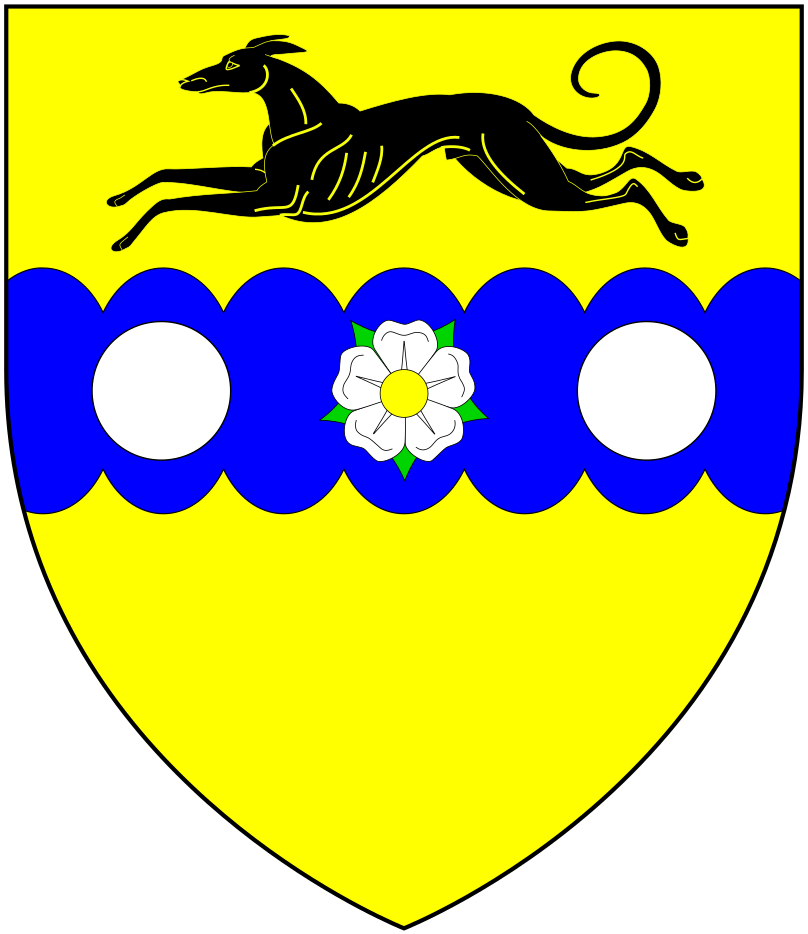
Arms of Hayne: Or, on a fess invected azure a rose argent seeded of the first barbed vert between two plates in chief a greyhound courant sable

Charles I Hayne (d.1769), Sheriff of Devon and Colonel of the 4th Battalion Devon Militia, of Lupton and Fuge House in the parish of Blackawton in Devon, was the eldest son and heir of Cornelius Hayne (d.1733) who had inherited Lupton from his Upton ancestors. His son and heir was Charles II Hayne (1747-1821), Sheriff of Devon in 1772 and Colonel of the North Devon Militia, who inherited from his father Lupton and Fuge. The Hayne family had come to prominence in the person of John Hayne (d.1671) (grandfather of Cornelius Hayne), a merchant at Dartmouth during the reign of King Charles I (1625-1649), who had "acquired by inheritance and purchase various properties in Devon".

Charles II Hayne was only 22 when he inherited Lupton in 1769 and he built Lupton House which largely survives today. He did not marry but lived there alone for about twenty years. In 1788 he sold Lupton to Judge Francis Buller and made Fuge House his principal residence. He died in 1821, having bequeathed Fuge House to his great-nephew Charles I Seale-Hayne (d.1842) (on condition he should adopt the additional surname of Hayne), the second son of Sir John Henry Seale, 1st Baronet (1780–1844), of Mount Boone, Dartmouth, the son of his sister Sarah Hayne. The son of Charles I Seale-Hayne was Charles II Seale-Hayne (1833-1903), Member of Parliament for Ashburton in Devon (1885-1903) and Paymaster General (1892-1895), who by his will founded Seale-Hayne College near Newton Abbot in Devon.

=== Buller ===
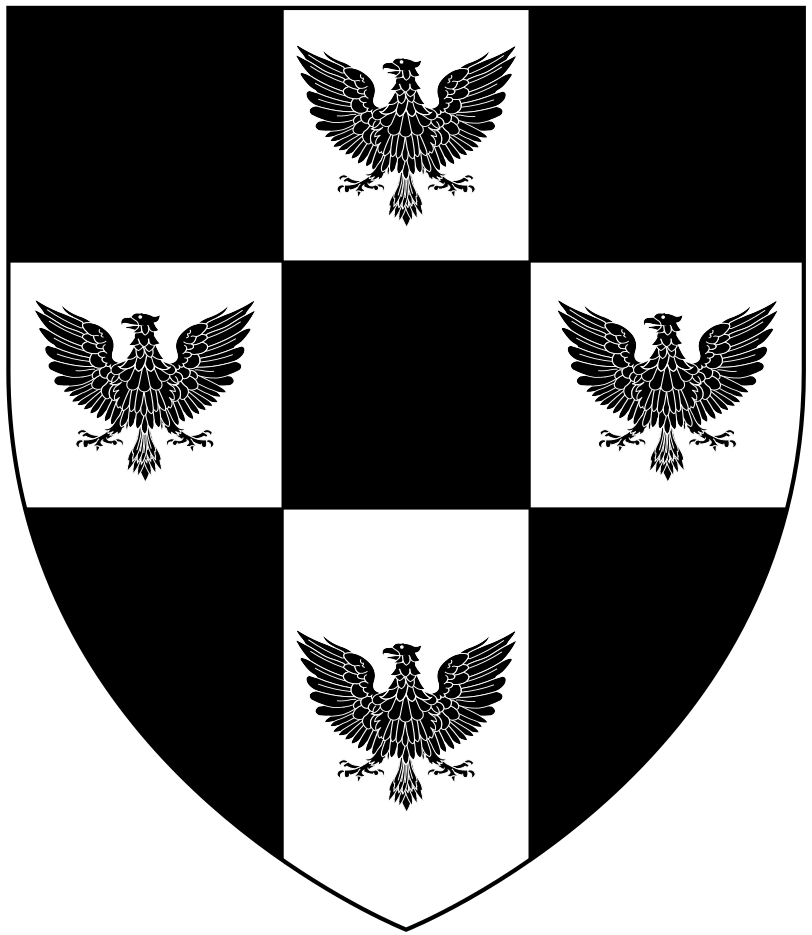
Arms of Buller: Sable, on a cross argent quarter pierced of the field four eagles displayed of the first

The ancient family of Buller is descended from Ralph Buller of Word in Somerset, sixth in descent from whom was Richard Buller who settled in Cornwall and married the heiress of Tregarrick. They derived much of their political power from their kinship to the Trelawny family of Trelawny in the parish of Pelynt, Cornwall, who controlled the pocket borough of nearby East Looe. John Buller (1632–1716), MP, of Shillingham near Saltash, in Cornwall, married Anne Coode, daughter and sole heiress of John Coode of Morval in Cornwall, which then became the family's principal seat.

==== Sir Francis Buller, 1st Baronet (1746-1800) ====
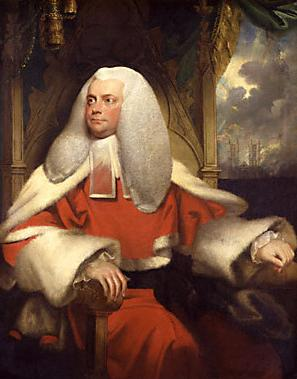
Sir Francis Buller, 1st Baronet (1746-1800)

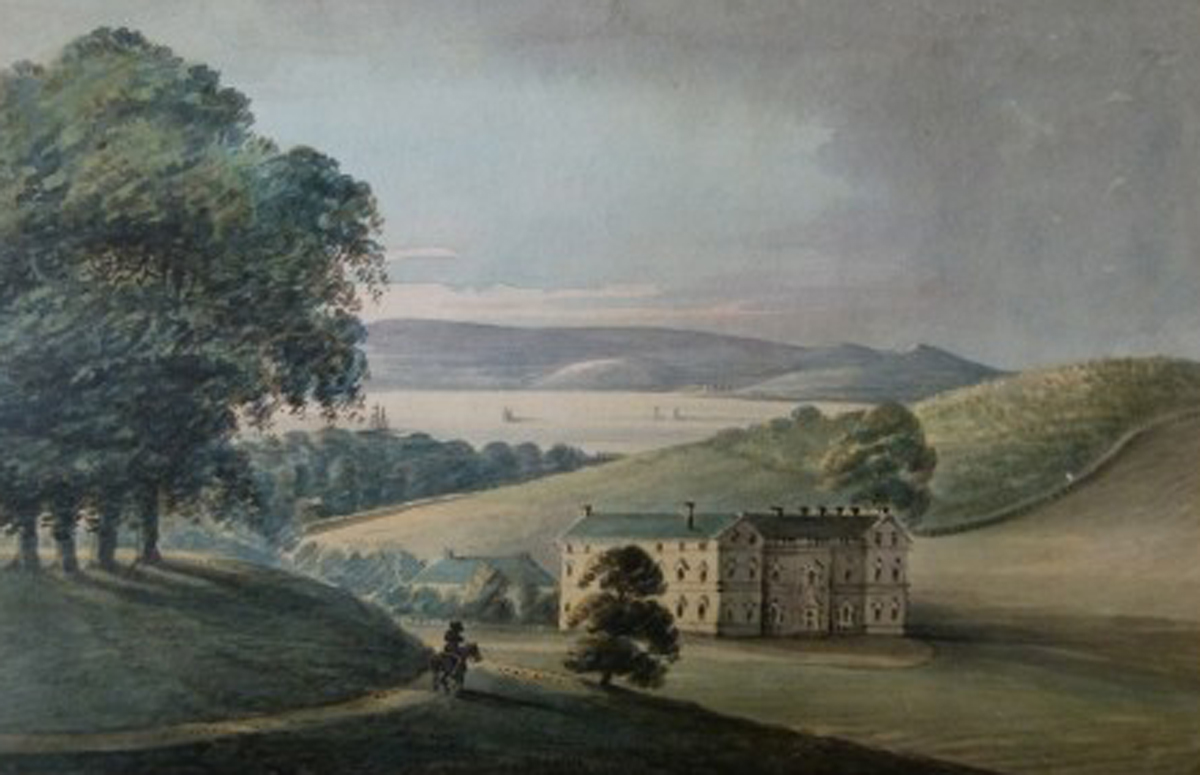
Lupton House, 1793 watercolour by Rev John Swete titled: "Lupton, seat of Sir Francis Buller"

Sir Francis Buller, 1st Baronet (1746-1800) "since the acquisition of so fine a place (i.e. Lupton) hath quitted Churston, the antient seat of the Yarde's", as wrote Rev. John Swete in 1793. Churston Court is about one mile north of Lupton, and long remained a possession of the Buller family after the purchase of Lupton. Sir Francis Buller was the third son of James Buller (1717-1765) of Morval in Cornwall and of Downes, Crediton and of New Place, King's Nympton in Devon, a Member of Parliament for East Looe in Cornwall (1741-7) and for the County of Cornwall (1748-1765). Francis Buller's mother was Lady Jane Bathurst, his father's second wife, a daughter of Allen Bathurst, 1st Earl Bathurst. Morval, the most ancient Buller seat, and Downes, were inherited by his father's eldest son from his first marriage, and thus Francis as a younger son, had to make his own fortune. The Buller family had a history of service in politics, church and law. Francis was an excellent student and at the age of seventeen he entered the Inner Temple to study law. In the same year he married Susanna Yarde, six years his senior, daughter and heiress of Francis Yarde of Churston. He began practicing law aged 19 and was immediately successful. Aged 32, he became a judge and in 1789 he was made a baronet. Judge Buller also had a residence on Dartmoor known as Prince Hall where he was a pioneer of moorland reclamation. In 1788 Francis bought Lupton House. He immediately began an extensive programme of planting and landscape improvement. The topographer and landscaping connoisseur Rev. John Swete visited the house in 1793 and painted the property as shown above. He noted that the north drive passed through 'newly planted grounds' and 'a most luxuriant shrubbery' which included a "great variety of flowering shrubs".

==== Sir Francis Buller-Yarde-Buller, 2nd Baronet (1767–1833) ====
Sir Francis Buller-Yarde-Buller, 2nd Baronet (1767–1833), son and heir, who inherited Lupton and Churston. He incorporated his mother's maiden name into his surname. He married Elizabeth Holliday, only daughter and sole heiress of John Holliday. of Dilhorne Hall in the parish of Dilhorne, Staffordshire. The couple did not live at Lupton House and for some years it was let.

==== John Yarde-Buller, 1st Baron Churston (1799-1871) ====
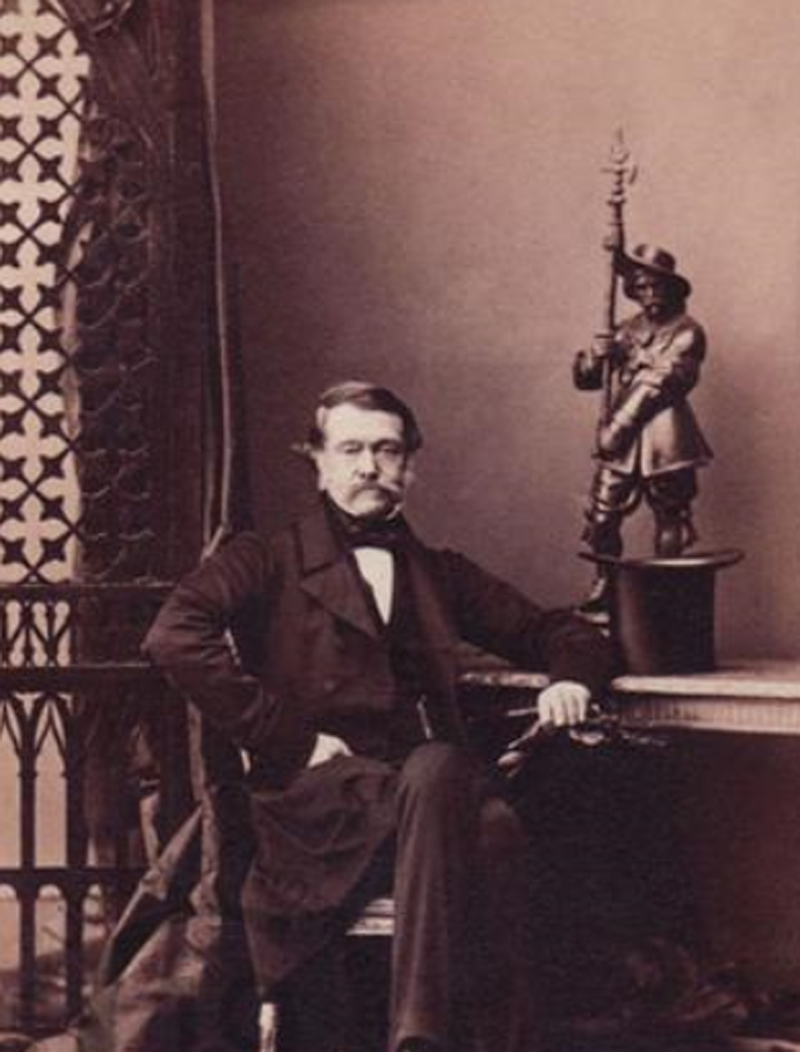
Sir John Yarde-Buller, 3rd Baronet, circa 1850, later 1st Baron Churston

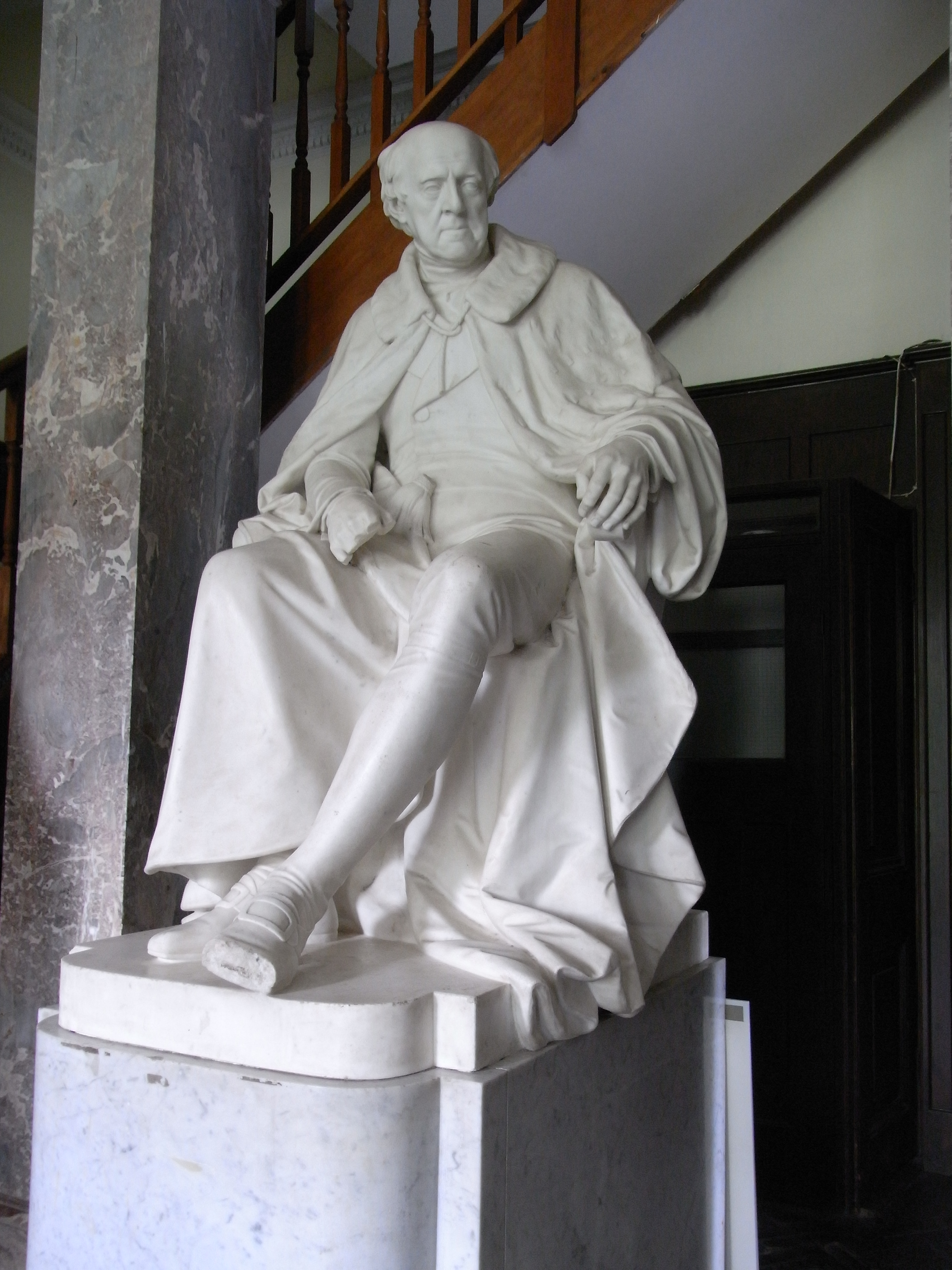
Marble statue of John Rolle, 1st Baron Rolle (1750-1842), by Edward Bowring Stephens, entrance hall of Lupton House, inscribed on rear: "E B Stephens sculp London 1843". This statue dominates the entrance hall of Lupton and was placed there by John Yarde-Buller, 1st Baron Churston, shortly after his remodelling of the house and one year after Lord Rolle's death. It is not known why Buller held Lord Rolle in such high esteem. The statue survived the later disastrous fire, having lost only the tips of the right hand and left foot. The staircase behind was put in the 80s to meet fire regulations as it was a boarding school for boys. An identical version dated 1844 exists in the entrance hall of Bicton House, Lord Rolle's home

John Yarde-Buller, 1st Baron Churston (1799-1871), son and heir, 3rd Baronet, in 1858 created Baron Churston "of Churston-Ferrers and Lupton, Devon", In 1833 he inherited Lupton house and some years later made extensive improvements to Lupton House and gardens, to the designs of George Wightwick. In 1860 by royal licence he dropped the first "Buller" from the family surname.

He was born in 1799 in Staffordshire and was educated at Oxford. In 1834 he was elected as Member of Parliament for South Devon, which seat he held for about 20 years. In 1823 he married Elizabeth Wilson-Patten, a daughter of Thomas Wilson-Pattern, a wealthy land owner, and sister of John Wilson-Patten, 1st Baron Winmarleigh. By his wife he had two children John and Bertha.

A notice appeared in 1841 in a local newspaper:

The recent alterations and improvements at Lupton, the splendid residence of Sir J Yarde Buller having been completed the Honourable Baronet has again returned to it with all of his establishment.

These alterations were designed by George Wightwick, a well-known architect. Twenty six plans survive of the additions he made to the house. The main entrance was moved from the south to the west side and a Doric porte-cochere was added. A Tudor Gothic lodge was also added. At the same time formal gardens and terraces were constructed to the south and east of the house. A new south drive was constructed, and cedars and pines were planted in the park.

Wightwick also designed the stables, conservatory and kennels as surviving plans reveal. At about the same time the artist Samuel Cook was commission to paint murals on the walls of the staircase of views immediately outside the house. Further remodeling of the house was made by the 1st Baron in 1860 when he commissioned Anthony Salvin to make more additions.

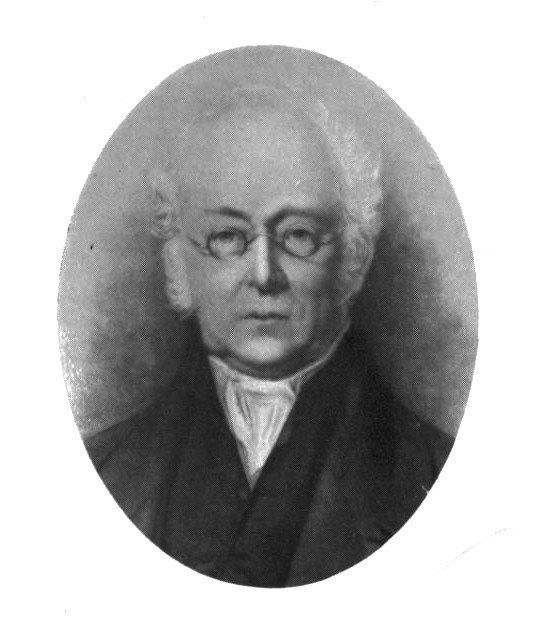
James Veitch, landscape designer for Lupton House

It seems that two famous designers were involved in the laying out of Lupton Gardens in 1840, namely James Veitch and George Wightwick. The Italian gardens appear to have been at least partially designed by George Wightwick as a detailed coloured plan survives in his portfolio entitled: "Design for the Italian gardens, Lupton House, near Brixham: general plan and elevation and section of balustrade on its dwarf wall".

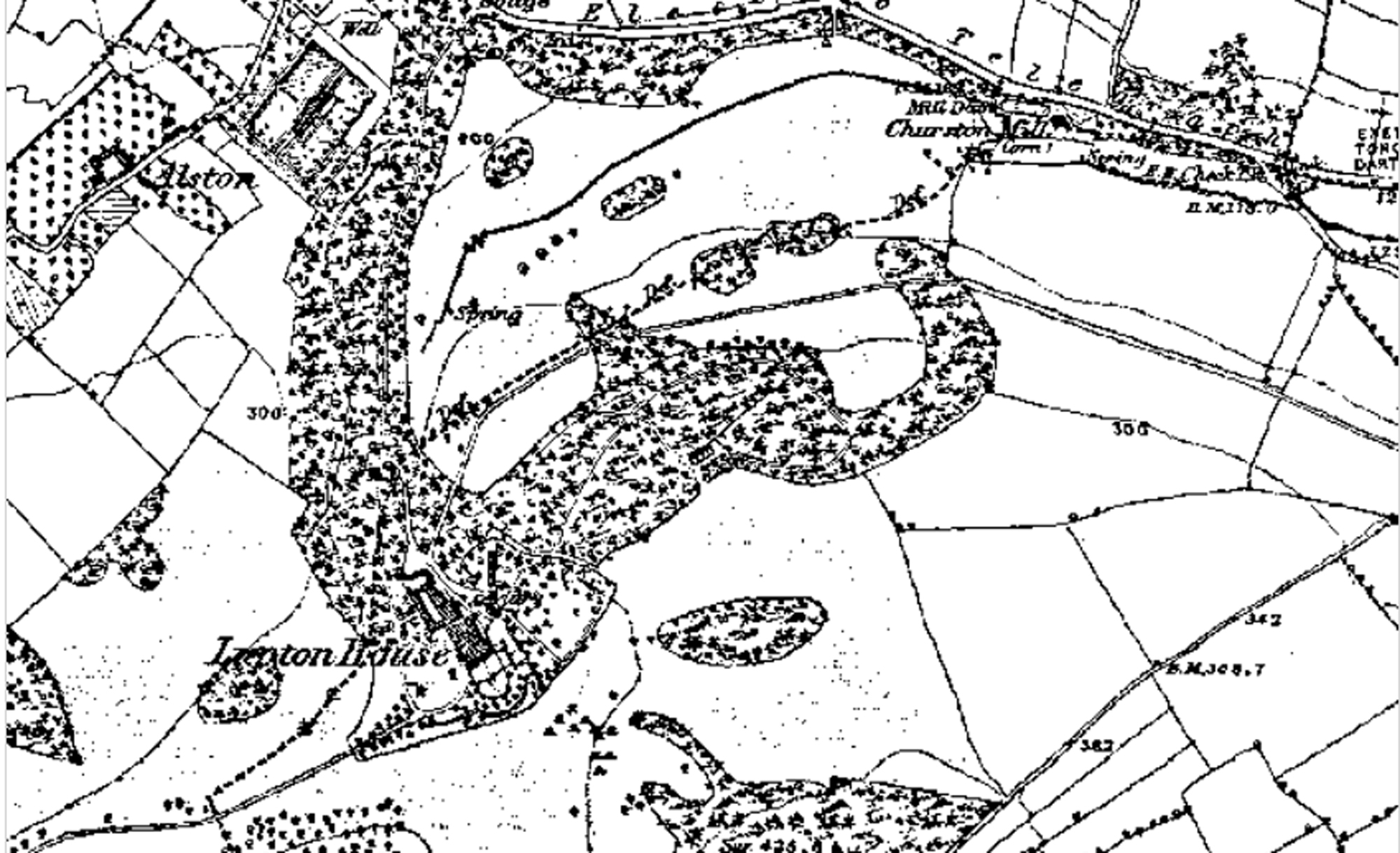
Ordnance Survey Map of Lupton House in 1869, showing the garden

A very detailed description of the whole garden was given in the Gardeners Chronicle and Agricultural Gazette in 1869. This article states that James Veitch designed the gardens, road and the kitchen garden. Some of the highlights of the garden outlined in this two part magazine feature are as follows:

"The garden is bounded and likewise partially divided round the centre with a strong balustraded wall furnished with iron supports and chains drooping between the uprights. These chains prove capital training places for creepers and are well covered. The whole garden is carried out on a level with the base of the mansion. It is laid out on a solid basis of gravel and granite walks, the chief paths being edged with stone. The figure is very simple – a square cut into two by a centre walk which converges upon a fountain, the fountain itself being picked out upon the inner line of the semicircle that completes the boundary of the garden. The secondary arrangements as they may be termed or the dividing of these spaces into beds harmonise well with the general outline, architectural position and character of the garden."

The second part of the feature describes the kitchen garden as follows:

"The garden is divided into two portions – the fruit garden and the vegetable garden; good wide slips of ground are also carried all round outside the walls for cultural purposes and a nice young orchard of thriving trees occupies a space between the garden and a public road. The ground in the fruit garden has been made almost if not quite level that in the vegetable garden has a regular and even fall. Immense quantities of earth had to be moved to secure these forms of surface and it was turned to account thus:- At the boundary of the fruit garden a thick retaining wall was built; in front of this the back wall for a range of glass running right across the garden was built leaving room for fruit rooms, sheds stoke holes etc. between the two walls. All the spare earth was thus used to fill up the space between the two walls and to carry a terrace walk right across the garden, eight or ten feet above the vegetable ground."

The 1st Baron died in 1871 and was succeeded by his grandson in the title and properties, as his only son had predeceased him.

==== John Yarde-Buller, 2nd Baron Churston (1846–1910) ====
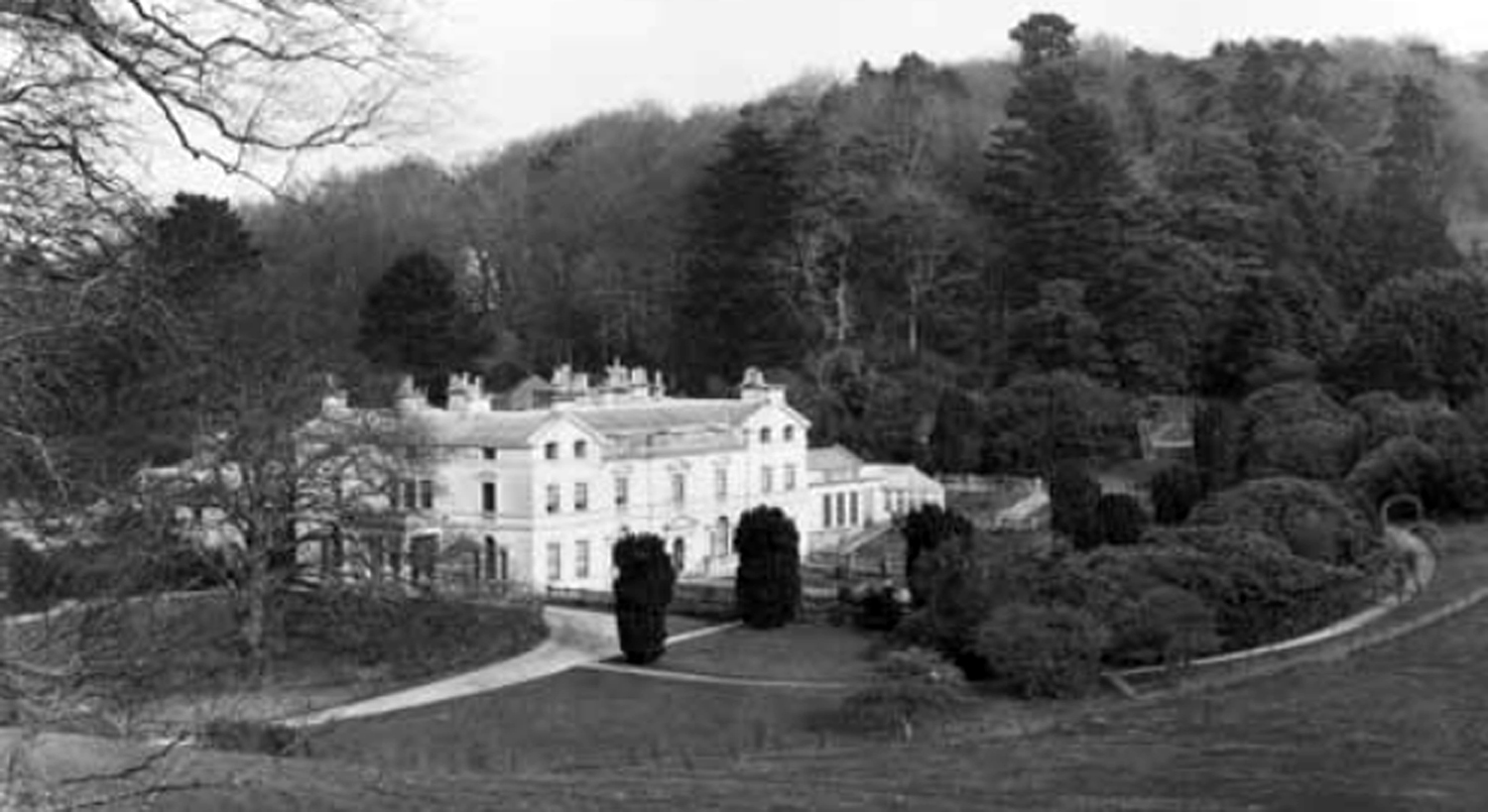
Lupton House circa 1900

John Yarde-Buller, 2nd Baron Churston (1846–1910), grandson and heir, who inherited Lupton on the death of his grandfather the 1st Baron in 1871. He owned Lupton for about 40 years until his death in 1910. He was born in 1846 and until his inheritance served in the Scots Guards. After he inherited the title in 1871 he resigned from the military and concentrated on his estates. He married Barbara Yelverton, a daughter of Admiral Sir Hastings Reginald Yelverton, by whom he had three children, the youngest of whom, Giles Yarde-Buller, died of pneumonia at Lupton House in 1900, aged 24.

He became interested in local community affairs and was President of the Churston Cricket Club and Torquay Club and it was mainly through his efforts that the Churston Golf Club was established. He was also a keen yachtsman and belonged to the Royal Yacht Squadron. He was a friend of the Duke and Duchess of York (later King George and Queen Mary) and was a member of the house party that entertained them at Ugbrooke Park when they visited Devon in 1899. He died in 1910 and was succeeded in the title and estates by his son, John Reginald Lopes Yarde-Buller.

==== John Reginald Lopes Yarde-Buller, 3rd Baron Churston (1873–1930) ====
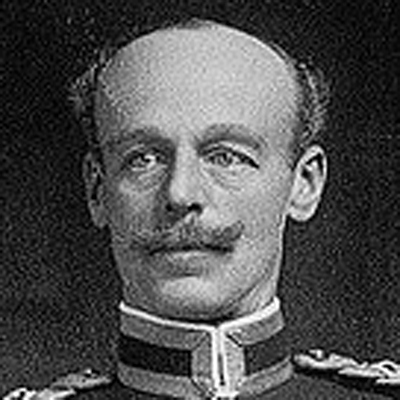
John Reginald Lopes Yarde-Buller, 3rd Baron Churston (1873–1930), wearing the uniform of the Scots Guards

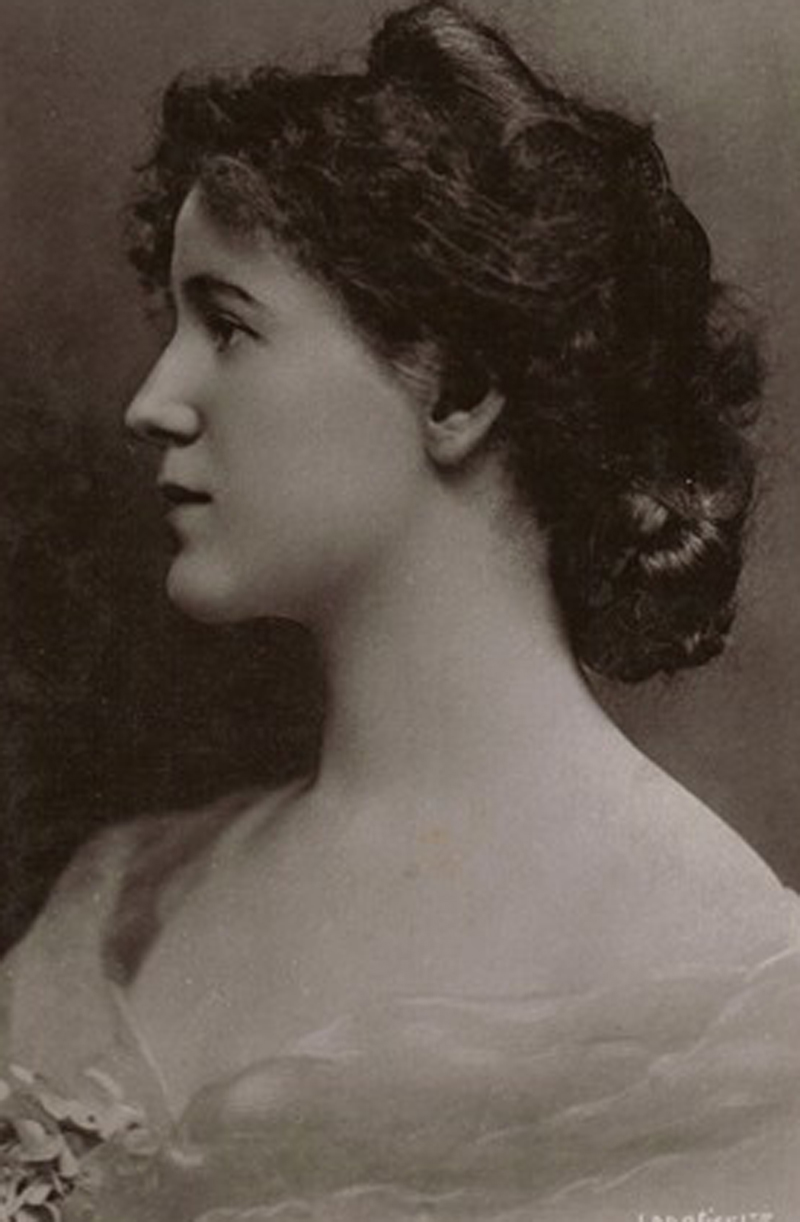
Jessie Smither, wife of the 3rd Baron

John Reginald Lopes Yarde-Buller, 3rd Baron Churston (1873–1930), son and heir, who was born in 1873 and was educated at Winchester College and later served for many years in the Scots Guards. He served in the Boer War and was awarded the Queen's Medal. Later he was Aide-de Camp to the Viceroy of India and to Prince Arthur, 1st Duke of Connaught and Strathearn (1850–1942).

In 1907 at the age of 36 he married Jessie Smither, an actress whose stage name was Denise Orme. Three years later in 1910 after the death of his father, he inherited Lupton House. The 3rd Baron had six children, including Joan Yarde-Buller, who in 1936 married Prince Aly Khan in Paris. In 1926 a major fire damaged Lupton House and resulted in the removal of the third floor. Much of the fine paneling and decorative plasterwork were lost. He died in 1930 and was succeeded in the title and estates by his son, Richard Yarde-Buller.

==== Richard Francis Roger Yarde-Buller, 4th Baron Churston (1910–1991) ====
Richard Francis Roger Yarde-Buller, 4th Baron Churston (1910–1991), son and heir, who owned Lupton until 1960 during most of which time it was let as he did not live there. In 1943 during World War II both the house and estate were requisitioned by the military. The estate played a major role in the support and training of the U.S. Infantry in their preparations for Operation Overlord and the D-Day landings.

== Modern history ==
In 1926 much of the interior was destroyed by fire, and the house was rebuilt, but with the top floor omitted. During World War II the house and grounds were used by American forces. Following the war it became a hotel and then housed successively three schools, Fenton School, Lupton House School, and, between 1990 and 2004, Gramercy Hall School.

In 1960 the property was acquired by Rowland Smith (d. 1979), proprietor of Rowland Smith Motors in Hampstead, North London, and of the Palace Hotel in Torquay, and who in 1949 had purchased as his country residence nearby Coleton Fishacre House, now owned by the National Trust.

In 2008 the Lupton Trust was established which currently uses the house and grounds for a variety of commercial activities, mainly concerning community groups, charities and social enterprises, all designed to assist in financing a restoration.
