= Richard Yarde-Buller, 4th Baron Churston =

British peer (1910–1991)

Lieutenant Commander The Right Honourable The Lord Churston VRD

Personal details
- Born: Richard Francis Roger Yarde-Buller; 12 February 1910
- Died: 9 April 1991 (aged 81)
- Spouses: Elizabeth Mary du Pré (m. 1933; div. 1943) Sandra Needham Dunfee (m. 1949; died 1979) Olga Alice Muriel Rothschild Blair (m. 1981)
- Children: John Yarde-Buller, 5th Baron Churston; Nicole Russell
- Parent(s): John Yarde-Buller, 3rd Baron Churston; Denise Orme
- Education: Eton College

Richard Francis Roger Yarde-Buller, 4th Baron Churston VRD (12 February 1910 – 9 April 1991) was a British peer and a naval officer.

== Early life ==
Yarde-Buller was born on 12 February 1910. He was the eldest son of John Yarde-Buller, 3rd Baron Churston and the former actress Denise Orme. After his parents divorced in 1928, his mother married, and later divorced Theodore William Wessel, the former Danish chargé d'affaires in Chile, before marrying the 7th Duke of Leinster in 1946. His siblings were Hon. Joan Yarde-Buller (who married Loel Guinness, Prince Aly Khan, and 2nd Viscount Camrose); Hon. John Reginald Henry; Denise Grosvenor, Baroness Ebury (wife of the 5th Baron Ebury); Lydia Russell, Duchess of Bedford (wife of John Russell, 13th Duke of Bedford) and Primrose Cadogan, Countess Cadogan (wife of the 7th Earl Cadogan).

He was educated at Eton College.

== Career ==
In 1926, his father's country seat, Lupton House in Churston Ferrers, suffered a major fire which damaged the house and resulted in the removal of the third floor. Much of the fine paneling and decorative plasterwork were lost. After he succeeded to his titles, he inherited Lupton, owning the house until 1960 (when it was sold to Rowland Smith), during most of which time it was let as he did not live there. In 1943, during World War II both the house and estate were requisitioned by the military. The estate played a major role in the support and training of the U.S. Infantry in their preparations for Operation Overlord and the D-Day landings.

Upon his father's death on 19 April 1930, he succeeded as the 4th Baron Churston of Churston Ferrers and Lupton and the 6th Baronet Buller.

He gained the rank of Lieutenant-Commander in the Royal Naval Volunteer Reserve and fought in World War II. He was awarded the Royal Naval Volunteer Reserve Officers' Decoration in 1949.

== Personal life ==
On 5 January 1933, Lord Churston was married to Elizabeth Mary du Pré, the second daughter of Lt.-Col. William Baring du Pré of Wilton Park and, his first wife, the former Youri Wynyard Wright (only daughter of Capt. Henry Townley Wright of the Royal Navy). Before they divorced in 1943, they had two children:

- John Francis Yarde-Buller, 5th Baron Churston (b. 1934), who married Alexandra Joanna Contomichalos, daughter of Anthony Contomichalos, in 1973.
- Hon. Nicole Yarde-Buller (b. 1936), who married, firstly, Richard Wilfred Beavoir Berens, son of Herbert Cecil Berens of Bentworth Hall, in 1958. They divorced in 1962 and she married, secondly, Michael Russell, son of Edward Dennis Russell, in 1963.

After their divorce, Lady Churston married Maj. Peter Laycock on 10 December 1943 before her death on 23 September 1951. On 31 March 1949, Lord Churston remarried to Sandra (née Needham) Griffiths Dunfee, who had acted under the stage name Sandra Storme. She was the daughter of Percy Needham and former wife of Arthur Griffiths and Jack Dunfee. They remained married until her death on 1 December 1979.

In 1981, Lord Churston married for the third time to Olga Alice Muriel (née Rothschild) Blair, the former wife of Bryce Evans Blair. Olga was the illegitimate daughter of Walter Rothschild, 2nd Baron Rothschild by his mistress, Marie Barbara Fredenson (a daughter of Maximilian Fredenson).

Lord Churston died on 9 April 1991. Lady Churston died in 1992.

Peerage of the United Kingdom
Preceded by John Yarde-Buller	Baron Churston; 1930–1991	Succeeded by John Yarde-Buller
