= Puslinch =

Puslinch may refer to the following places:

- Puslinch, Devon, England
- Puslinch, Ontario, Canada
