= Sir Francis Buller, 1st Baronet =

British judge (1746–1800)

The Right Honourable Sir Francis Buller Bt KC
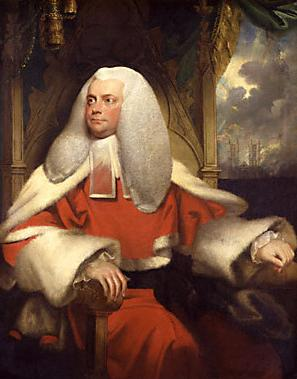

King's Bench
- In office 6 May 1778 – 19 June 1794
- Succeeded by: Sir Francis Buller-Yarde-Buller, 2nd Baronet

Personal details
- Born: 17 March 1746 Devon, England
- Died: 5 June 1800 (aged 54) London, England
- Education: King's School Ottery St. Mary; Christ's Hospital, London.
- Occupation: Judge

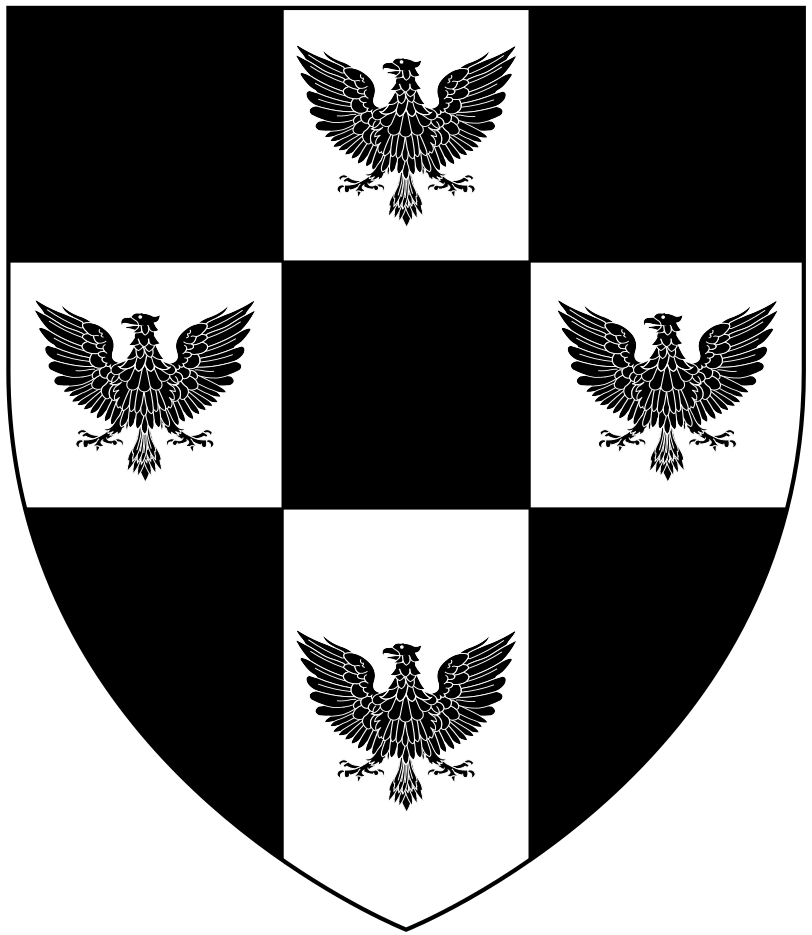
Arms of Buller: Sable, on a cross argent quarter pierced of the field four eagles displayed of the first

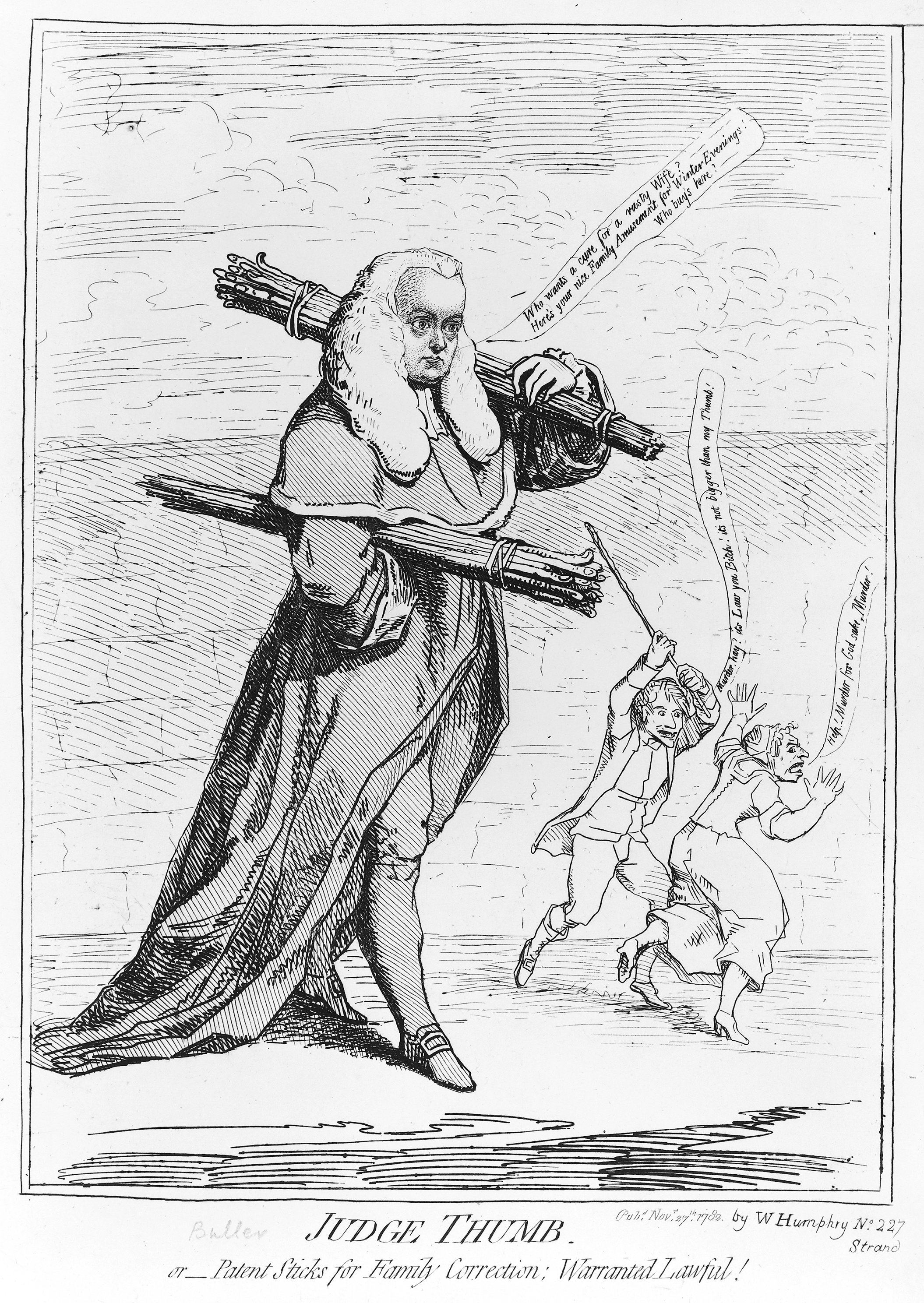
1782 caricature of Buller by James Gillray entitled "Judge Thumb, or, Patent Sticks for Family Correction: Warranted Lawful!". Judge Thumb, carrying two bundles of sticks, one on his shoulder like the fasces of a Roman magistrate, asks: "Who wants a cure for a rusty wife? Here's your nice family amusement for winter evenings! Who buys here?" Woman screams: "Help! Murder, for God sake, murder!" Husband replies: "Murder, hey? It's law, you bitch: it's not bigger than my thumb!"

Sir Francis Buller, 1st Baronet (17 March 1746 – 5 June 1800) was an English judge.

== Origins ==
Buller was born at Downes House in the parish of Crediton in Devon, a younger son of James Buller (1717–1765), of Downes and of King's Nympton Park, both in Devon and of Morval in Cornwall, a Member of Parliament for Cornwall, by his second wife Lady Jane Bathurst, daughter of Allen Bathurst, 1st Earl Bathurst. As his elder brothers inherited the substantial family estates, Buller as a younger son was obliged to make his own fortune, which he achieved both from his brilliant legal career and from having married a wealthy heiress.

== Career ==
=== Legal career ===
After an education at The King's School, Ottery St Mary in Devon, and at Christ's Hospital, London, in February 1763 he entered the Inner Temple as a pupil of William Henry Ashurst, special pleader, and obtained his own certificate as special pleader in 1765. In Easter term 1772 he was called to the bar and rose rapidly, becoming King's Counsel on 24 November 1777. After being appointed Puisne Justice of Chester in 1777 he was promoted, on 6 May 1778 aged just 32, to be a puisne judge of the King's Bench.

His conduct on the bench, however, was often the subject of severe criticism, and he was accused of being hasty and prejudiced. He has been the subject of controversy over time due to an alleged statement he made that "a husband could thrash his wife with impunity provided that he used a stick no bigger than his thumb". This claim was widely circulated and led to Buller being caricatured as "Judge Thumb" by James Gillray in 1782. Under the system of coverture marriage, a couple became one legal person, over which the husband had rights and responsibility; accordingly, crimes by him against her were not recognised except in the most extreme cases. If Buller did indeed make the ruling, it was merely a refinement of earlier precedent, as for example the death of a wife by beating with a pestle had been ruled as murder, but only after consideration that "though a husband by law may correct, the pestle was no instrument for correction".

He was one of the three judges in the 1783 appeal hearing of the Zong massacre case. He also presided over an important trial in 1785 involving the validity of a patent held by Richard Arkwright the cotton manufacturer. The jury held the patent to be invalid because the specification was unclear. Expert evidence showed that Arkwright had claimed as his own inventions made by others. Arkwright had by that time established several cotton spinning mills, and continued to prosper despite losing the patent battle.

Buller was always the second judge in his court, although when Lord Mansfield was absent through illness in the last two years of his life, Buller took the lead and in effect acted as Lord Chief Justice. On Mansfield's death, the Prime Minister William Pitt the Younger having long deliberated, passed over Buller, considered by many to be the superior lawyer, and appointed Kenyon to top role. However, as additional recognition, Pitt made Buller a baronet of Lupton House in the County of Devon on 13 January 1790. On 19 June 1794 Buller resigned from the King's Bench and took his place in the Court of Common Pleas.

He was a guardian of Lady Anne Brydges (died 1836) daughter and sole heiress of James Brydges, 3rd Duke of Chandos and was a trustee of the 1796 marriage settlement between her and Richard Temple, later 1st Duke of Buckingham and Chandos.

=== Moorland improver ===
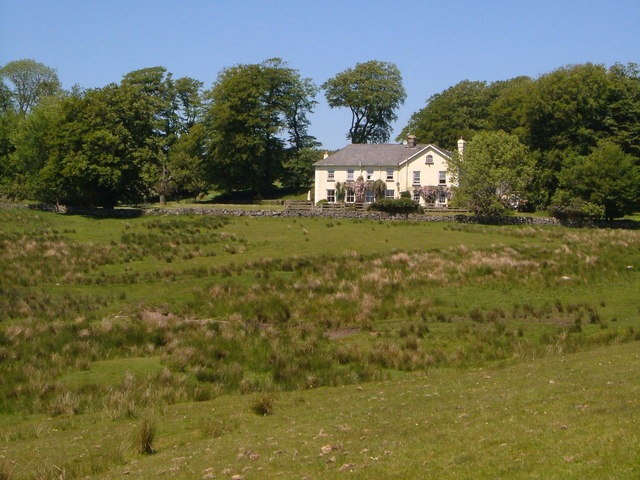
Prince Hall, today a hotel

In 1790 or shortly before, Buller bought the Ancient Tenement of Prince Hall on Dartmoor, Devon, from Christopher Gullet who had acquired it some ten years earlier and had already built new farm buildings on the old site. Buller greatly extended the buildings, converting the property into one of "Georgian opulence". He was friendly towards his tenants and other workers on the moor, whom he invited to weekly religious services at Prince Hall.

He also enclosed some 2,000 acres around Prince Hall, and set about improving the land. There was a strong belief amongst forward thinkers of the time that Dartmoor's poor moorland soil could be "improved" for agriculture. Robert Fraser in his 1794 book General View of the Agriculture of the County of Devon (one of the General View of Agriculture county surveys series) promoted Buller's programme of fertilising the soil, improving the breeds of sheep and cattle and large scale planting of trees, as an example of best practice – even though he noted that almost all of the 40,000 larch and other conifers that Buller had planted had already died. The avenue of trees leading to the property has, however, survived to the present day. While Buller was attempting to "improve" Dartmoor at Prince Hall, Thomas Tyrwhitt was doing the same at nearby Tor Royal.

Buller acquired other estates on Dartmoor, including Skerraton in the parish of Dean Prior. He also built an inn, named the Saracen's Head after the Buller family's crest, at Two Bridges, on a site now occupied by the Two Bridges Hotel.

== Marriage and children ==
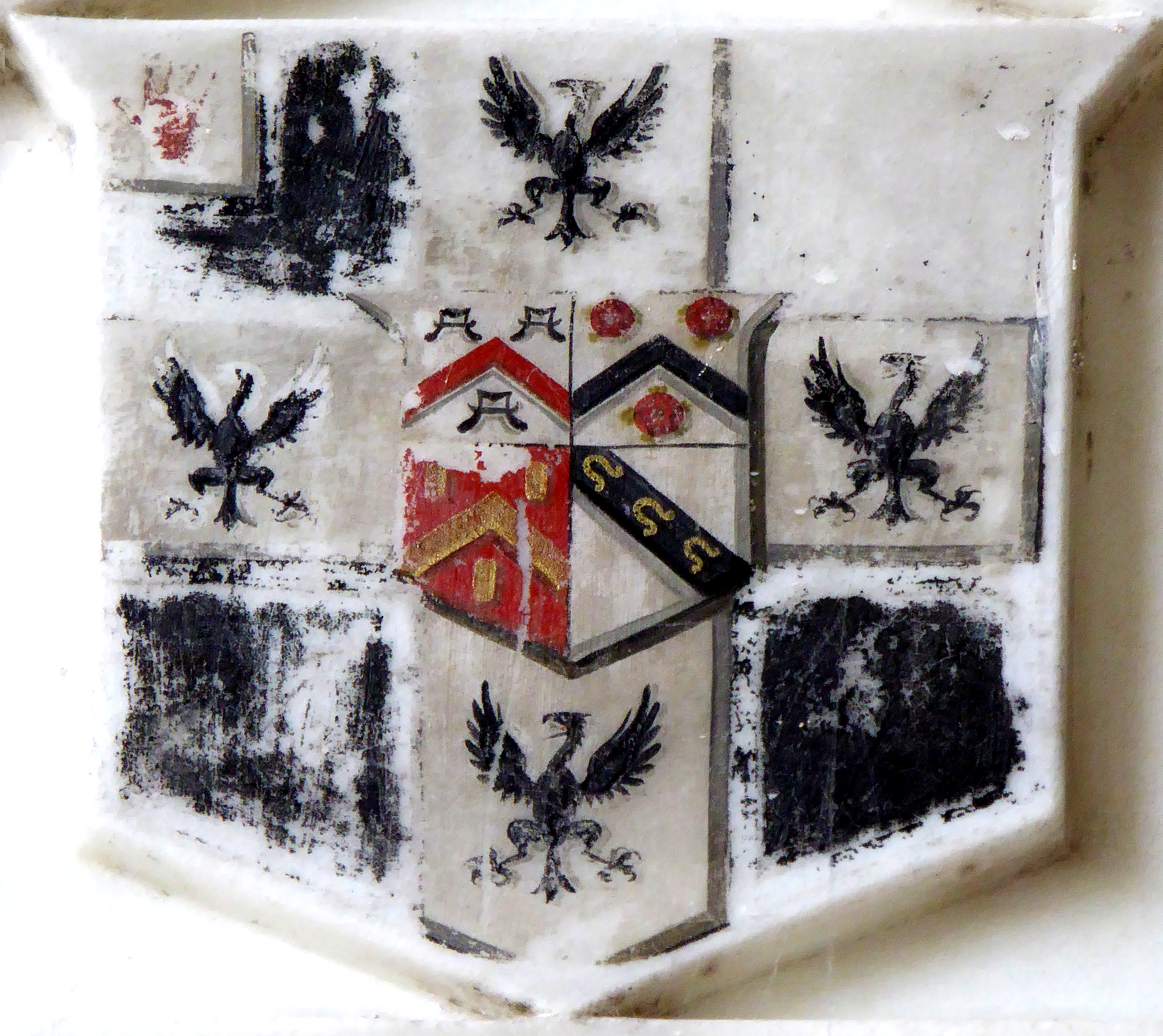
Detail from monument in Brixham Church to Sir Francis Buller, showing arms of Buller with a baronet's canton of the Red Hand of Ulster, with inescutcheon of pretence of Yarde (of 4 quarters: 1: Argent, a chevron gules between three water bougets sable (Yarde); 4: Argent, on a bend sable three horse-shoes or (Ferrers of Churston-Ferrers)) for his heiress wife Susanna Yarde (1740–1810)

In 1763, at the age of 17, he married a wealthy heiress, namely Susanna Yarde (1740–1810), only daughter and sole heiress of Francis Yarde (1704–1750) of Ottery St Mary in Devon, the fifth son of Edward Yarde (1669–1735), of Churston Court in the parish of Churston Ferrers, a Member of Parliament for Totnes in Devon 1695–1698. Susanna was the niece and heiress of John Yarde (1702–1773) of Churston Court, which thus became Buller's residence until he purchased Lupton House, one mile to the south. By his wife he had children including:

- Edward Buller, first-born son and heir apparent, who predeceased his father without children and was buried in the cemetery of St Andrew's Church, Holborn, City of London, near Gray's Inn.
- Sir Francis Buller-Yarde-Buller, 2nd Baronet (1767–1833), second and eldest surviving son and heir, who in compliance with the will of his maternal great-uncle John Yarde (1702–1773) assumed the surname Yarde in lieu of his patronymic, but later by royal sign manual added the additional surname Buller. He was the father of:
  - John Yarde-Buller, 1st Baron Churston (1799–1871), eldest surviving son, who was raised to the peerage in 1858;
  - Sir Edward Manningham-Buller, 1st Baronet (1800–1882), second surviving son, created a baronet in 1866, whose descendant was created Viscount Dilhorne in 1964.

== Death, burial & monument ==
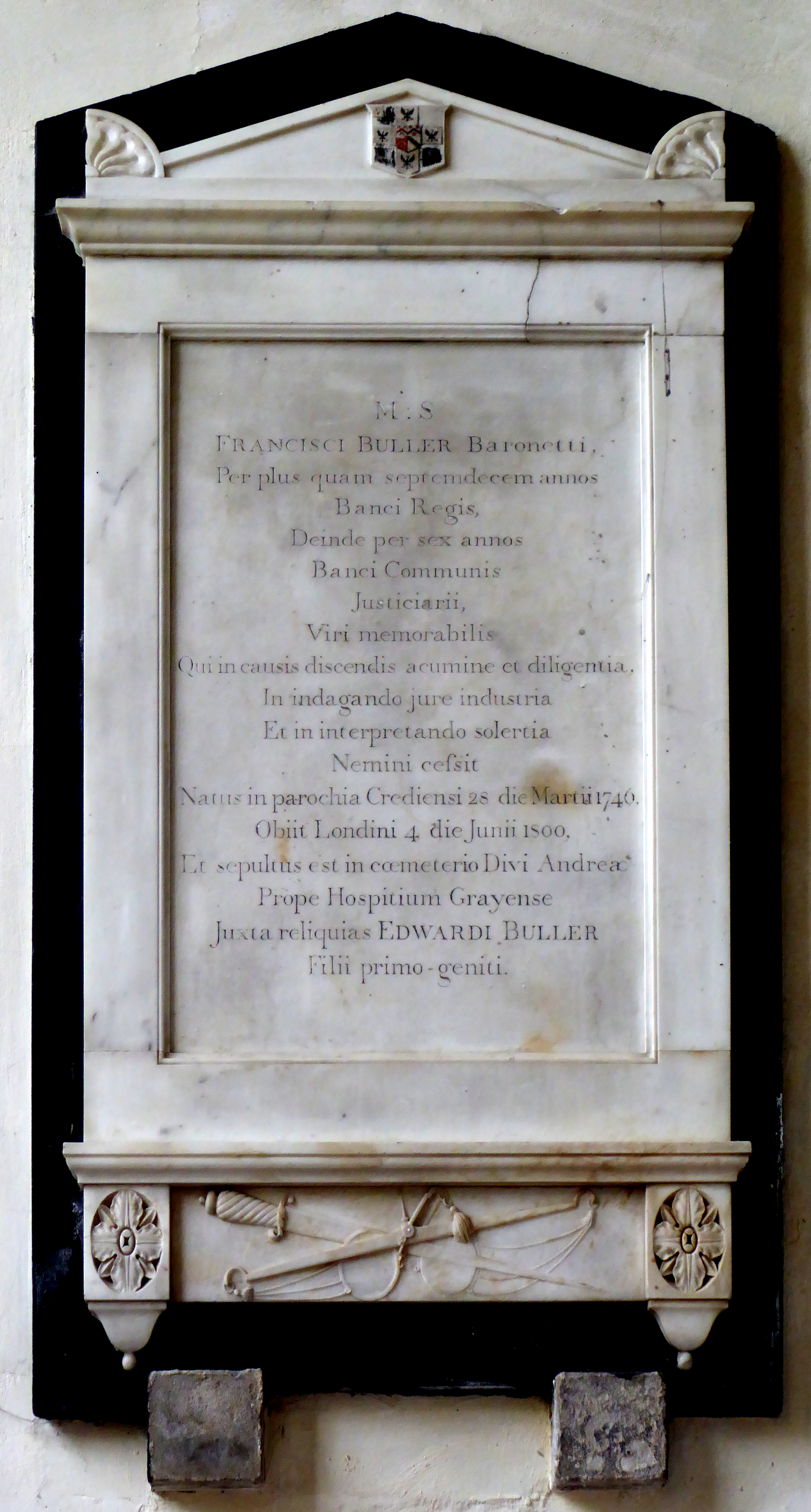
Mural monument to Sir Francis Buller, in the Buller Chapel in St Mary's Church, Brixham, Devon

In the late 1790s Buller was in poor health, suffering from frequent attacks of gout and other ailments. He died during the night of 4/5 June 1800 after suffering an acute breakdown in his health during a game of piquet at his house in Bedford Square in London, shortly before had intended to resign his legal position. He was buried in the churchyard of St Andrew's Church, Holborn, City of London, near Gray's Inn. A mural monument to him survives in the Yarde-Buller Chapel, north transept of St Mary's Church, Brixham, the parish church of Lupton House, inscribed in Latin as follows:

M(emoriae) S(acrum) Francisci Buller Baronetti per plus quam septemdecem annos Banci Regis deinde per sex annos Banci Communis Justiciarii viri memorabilis qui in causis discendis acumine et diligentia in indagando jure industria et in interpretando solertia nimini cessit. Natus in parochia Crediensi 28 die Martii 1746 obiit Londini 4 die Junii 1800 et sepultus est in caemeterio Divi Andrea prope Hospitium Grayense juxta reliquias Edwardi Buller filii primo-geniti

which may be translated as:

"Sacred to the memory of Francis Buller, Baronet, for more than seventeen years a Justice of the King's Bench, thereafter for six years of the Common Pleas, a memorable man who in cases to be decided ceded to no man in sharpness and diligence in researching the law and in industry and interpretation with skilfulness. He was born in the parish of Crediton on the 28th day of March 1746 he died in London on the 4th day of June 1800 and was buried in the cemetery of St Andrew's near Gray's Inn next to the remains of Edward Buller his first-born son".

Sculpted below in low relief is a sword of justice crossed by a beam of a set of scales of justice. At top is shown a shield of the Buller arms with inescutcheon of pretence of Yarde (of 4 quarters) for his heiress wife Susanna Yarde.

== Notes ==
Baronetage of Great Britain
New creation	Baronet (of Churston Court); 1790–1800	Succeeded by Francis Yarde-Buller
