= Joan Yarde-Buller =

English socialite (1908–1997)

The Right Honourable The Viscountess Camrose
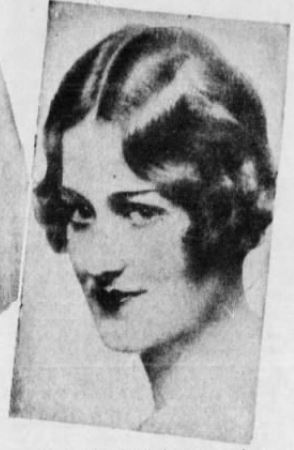
- Full name: Joan Barbara Yarde-Buller
- Born: 22 April 1908
- Died: 25 April 1997 (aged 89)
- Spouses: Loel Guinness (m. 1927; div. 1936) Prince Aly Khan (m. 1936; div. 1949) Seymour Berry, 2nd Viscount Camrose (m. 1986; died 1995)
- Issue: Patrick Guinness; Aga Khan IV; Prince Amyn Aga Khan
- Father: John Yarde-Buller, 3rd Baron Churston
- Mother: Denise Orme

Joan Barbara Berry, Viscountess Camrose (née Yarde-Buller; 22 April 1908 – 25 April 1997), also known as Joan Guinness and Princess Taj-ud-dawlah Aga Khan, was an English socialite who was one of the Bright Young Things.

== Early life ==
Joan Barbara Yarde-Buller was born on 22 April 1908. She was the eldest of six children born to John Yarde-Buller, 3rd Baron Churston, the aide-de-camp to the Viceroy of India, and Denise Orme, a former music hall singer. Among her siblings were brother, Richard Yarde-Buller, who became the 4th Baron Churston; sister Lydia Yarde-Buller, who became the Duchess of Bedford (wife of Ian Russell, 13th Duke of Bedford); and Primrose Yarde-Buller, who became the Countess Cadogan (wife of William Cadogan, 7th Earl Cadogan). After her parents’ divorce in 1928, her mother married Danish diplomat Tito Wessel. They too divorced and Denise married Edward FitzGerald, 7th Duke of Leinster.

Her father was the only son of John Yarde-Buller, 2nd Baron Churston, and Barbara Yelverton (the only child of Sir Hastings Yelverton and the 20th Baroness Grey de Ruthyn).

== Personal life ==
On 4 July 1927, Joan married Loel Guinness, at St Margaret's, Westminster, in London. Guinness, a British Conservative Member of Parliament, was the only son of Irish lawyer Benjamin Seymour Guinness (of the Guinness brewing family) and his first wife, Bridget Henrietta Frances Williams-Bulkeley. They had one son:

- Patrick Benjamin Guinness (1931–1965), who married Baroness Dolores von Fürstenberg-Hedringen (1936–2012), his stepsister from his father's third marriage, on 22 October 1955 in Paris.

Joan left Guinness for Prince Aly Khan, the eldest son of the Aga Khan III, the 48th Imam of the Nizari Ismailis, and Guinness successfully sued Joan and Khan on grounds of adultery. Joan and Khan did not defend the charges and the judge, Mr Justice Bucknill, granted Guinness a decree nisi and full custody of their son and ordered Khan to pay court costs.

=== Second marriage ===
A few days after the divorce from Guinness was effective, on 18 May 1936, in Paris, Joan Yarde-Buller married Prince Aly Khan. Before the wedding, Yarde-Buller converted to Islam and took the name "Taj-ud-dawlah", meaning "Crown of the Realm". Yarde-Buller and Khan had two sons:

- Aga Khan IV (1936–2025)
- Prince Amyn Aga Khan (b. 1937).

They divorced in 1949 and the Prince later married Rita Hayworth.

=== Third marriage ===
In March 1986, Joan married lastly Seymour Berry, 2nd Viscount Camrose, a newspaper magnate. They had been friends for more than thirty years. They lived at Hackwood Park, the Camrose home in Hampshire.

After his death in 1995, she was known as the Dowager Viscountess Camrose, also known as Joan, Viscountess Camrose.

== Ancestry ==
Ancestors of Joan Yarde-Buller

8. The Honourable John Buller
4. John Yarde-Buller, 2nd Baron Churston
9. Charlotte Chandos-Pole
2. John Yarde-Buller, 3rd Baron Churston
10. Sir Hastings Yelverton
5. The Honourable Barbara Yelverton
11. Barbara Rawdon-Hastings, 20th Baroness Grey de Ruthyn
1. Joan Yarde-Buller
12. Francis Dearsley Smither
6. Alfred John Smither
13. Elizabeth Green
3. Denise Orme
14. Vannam Pococke
7. Jessicah Henrietta Pococke
15. Henrietta Elizabeth Smith
