= Sandra Storme =

British actress (1914–1979)

The Right Honourable The Lady Churston
- Born: Eileen Violet Needham; 22 December 1914; London, England
- Died: 1 December 1979 (aged 64); Saint Andrew, Guernsey
- Occupation: Actress
- Spouses: Charles Wynne-Griffiths (died) Jack Dunfee (m. 1939; div. 1943) Richard Yarde-Buller, 4th Baron Churston (m. 1949)
- Children: David Wynne-Griffiths

Sandra Storme (née Eileen Violet Needham) (22 December 1914 – 1 December 1979) was an English dancer and actress, known for the films Murder in Soho (1939) and Q Planes (1939).

== Biography ==
She was born Eileen Violet Needham in London on 22 December 1914. (Note: Some sources give her birth date as April 1911.) Her father was company director Percy Needham. She later took the stage name Sandra Storme.

She signed a contract with Paramount Pictures and went to Hollywood to appear in two films in 1937 where, according to The Illustrated London News, she was known as “Miss Perfection”. She then returned to Britain and appeared in three more films and two experimental live television broadcasts by the BBC.

== Personal life ==
She was married three times: first to Claud Harold Berram Arthur Wynne-Griffiths, from whom she was widowed and with whom she had a son, David Wynne-Griffiths. Her second marriage was on 15 November 1939 to the racing driver Jack Dunfee at the Caxton Hall Register Office in London. That marriage ended in divorce in 1943. On 31 March 1949 she married Richard Yarde-Buller, 4th Baron Churston at the Marylebone Register Office. Storme met Lord Churston in 1948 when she was visiting his mother, the Duchess of Leinster.

Lady Churston died at Woodcote in Saint Andrew, Guernsey on 1 December 1979.

== Filmography ==
- Artist and Models (1937) – Model
- Sophie Lang Goes West (1937) – Helga Roma
- A Spot of Bother (1938) – Sadie
- Murder in Soho (1939) – Ruby Lane
- Rope (1939 live television broadcast) – Leila Arden
- Q Planes (1939) – Daphne
- The Little Father of the Wilderness (1939 live television broadcast) – Mlle. Henriette
