= John Buller =

John Buller may refer to:

- John Buller (Weymouth and Melcombe Regis MP), English Member of Parliament for Weymouth and Melcombe Regis (UK Parliament constituency), 1555
- John Buller (politician, born 1632) (1632–1716), English Member of Parliament for East Looe, Grampound, Liskeard, Saltash and West Looe
- John Buller (Lostwithiel MP) (1668–1701), English Member of Parliament for Lostwithiel, 1701
- John Buller (politician, born 1721) (1721–1786), British Member of Parliament for East Looe
- John Buller (politician, born 1745) (1745–1793), British Member of Parliament for Exeter, Launceston, and West Looe
- John Buller (politician, died 1807), British Member of Parliament for East Looe, 1796–1799, 1802–1807
- John Buller (politician, born 1771) (1771–1849), British Member of Parliament for West Looe, 1796, 1826
- John Buller (composer) (1927–2004), British composer

== See also ==
- John Yarde-Buller, 1st Baron Churston
- Buller (surname)
