= Charles Cadogan, 8th Earl Cadogan =

British billionaire peer and landowner (1937–2023)

The Right Honourable The Earl Cadogan KBE DL
- Earl Cadogan
- Tenure: 1997–2023
- Other titles: Viscount Chelsea (1937–1997)
- Born: Charles Gerald John Cadogan; 24 March 1937
- Died: 11 June 2023 (aged 86)
- Spouses: Lady Philippa Wallop (m. 1963; died 1984) Jennifer Jane Greig Rae (m. 1989; div. 1994) Dorothy Ann Shipsey (m. 1994)
- Issue: Lady Anna-Karina Cadogan; Edward Charles Cadogan, 9th Earl Cadogan; William John Cadogan
- Parents: William Cadogan, 7th Earl Cadogan; Primrose Lilian Yarde-Buller

Charles Gerald John Cadogan, 8th Earl Cadogan, KBE, DL (24 March 1937 – 11 June 2023), styled as Viscount Chelsea until 1997, was a British billionaire peer and landowner.

== Early life and education ==
Cadogan was the son of William Gerald Charles Cadogan, 7th Earl Cadogan and Primrose Lilian Yarde-Buller, and was known as Viscount Chelsea before inheriting the title of Earl Cadogan on the death of his father on 4 July 1997. He was a first cousin of the Aga Khan IV, spiritual head of the Ismaili sect of Shia Muslims.

He was educated at Ludgrove School and Eton College.

== Military service ==
On 14 April 1956, Cadogan was commissioned in the Coldstream Guards, British Army in the rank of second lieutenant to undertake his national service. On 26 September 1957, he was transferred to the Army Emergency Reserve of Officers, thereby ending his period of full-time service. He was promoted to lieutenant on 23 December 1957. On 2 March 1961, he was transferred to the Regular Army Reserve of Officers, thereby ending his military service.

== Career ==
Cadogan chaired Chelsea Football Club from 1981 until 1982 and was also a Governor of Culford School in Suffolk. He owned Bedfordshire-based high-end upholstered furniture manufacturer, Peter Guild Ltd, (now based in Long Eaton) for a period during the 1990s.

He was appointed a Deputy Lieutenant (DL) of Greater London in 1996.

In the Sunday Times Rich List 2023 ranking of the wealthiest people in the United Kingdom, his family was placed 36th with an estimated fortune of £5.57 billion. He was the third richest UK-based peer behind Hugh Grosvenor, 7th Duke of Westminster and Lord Bamford. The Cadogan family's wealth is based on Cadogan Estates, which administers extensive landholdings in Chelsea, a wealthy part of London, including much of Sloane Street and Cadogan Hall.

In July 2021, he was worth over $6 billion according to Bloomberg.

== Honours ==
- Salvation Army Cross of the Order of Distinguished Auxiliary Service - 1970 (for exceptional service rendered to the Army by non-Salvationists)
- Knight Commander of the Order of the British Empire (KBE) - 2012 Birthday Honours (for charitable services)

== Marriages and children ==
On 6 June 1963 Cadogan married Lady Philippa Wallop (1937–1984), daughter of Gerard Wallop, 9th Earl of Portsmouth. They had two sons and one daughter:

- Lady Anna-Karina Cadogan (born 4 February 1964)
- Edward Charles Cadogan, 9th Earl Cadogan (born 10 May 1966)
- Hon William John Cadogan (born 9 November 1973)

Cadogan married secondly the etiquette expert Jennifer Rae (married 1989, divorced 1994).

His third marriage was to Dorothy Ann Shipsey (married 1994), formerly the matron at King Edward VII Hospital for Officers.

== Death ==
Cadogan died on 11 June 2023 at the age of 86. His titles passed to his elder son, Edward, who was educated at St David's College, Llandudno and served with the RAF in the first Gulf war.

== See also ==
- Cadogan Square

Sporting positions
Preceded by Brian Mears	Chelsea chairman 1981–1982	Succeeded by Ken Bates
Peerage of Great Britain
Preceded by William Cadogan	Earl Cadogan; 1997–2023	Succeeded by Edward Charles Cadogan
