= Baron Churston =

Title in the peerage of the United Kingdom

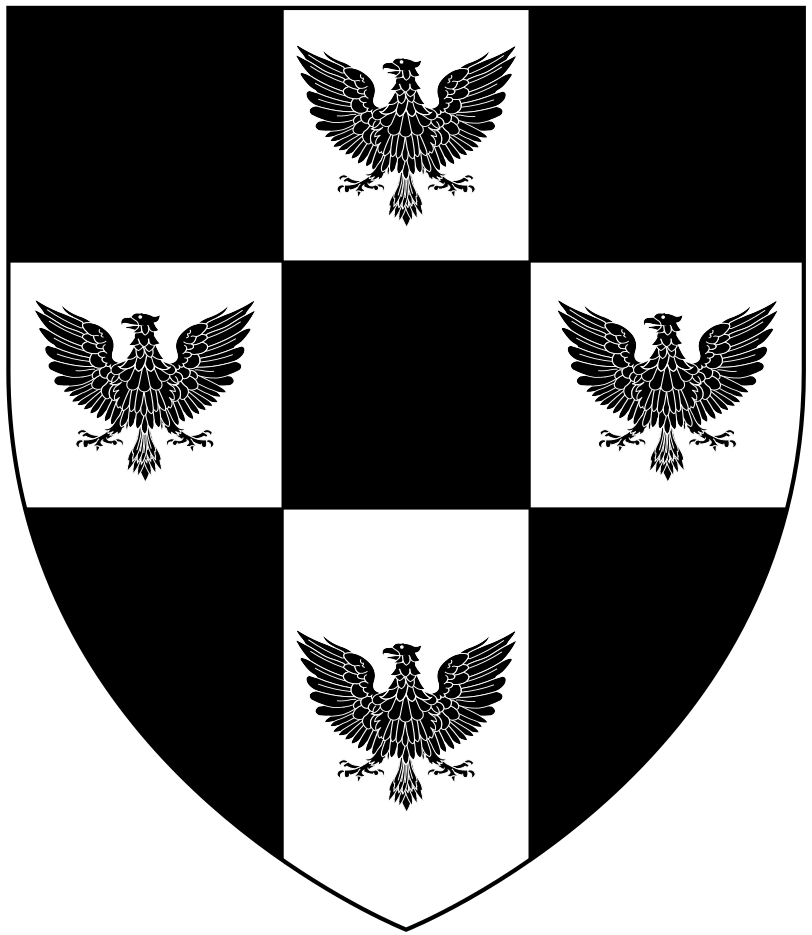
Arms of Buller: Sable, on a cross argent quarter pierced of the field four eagles displayed of the first

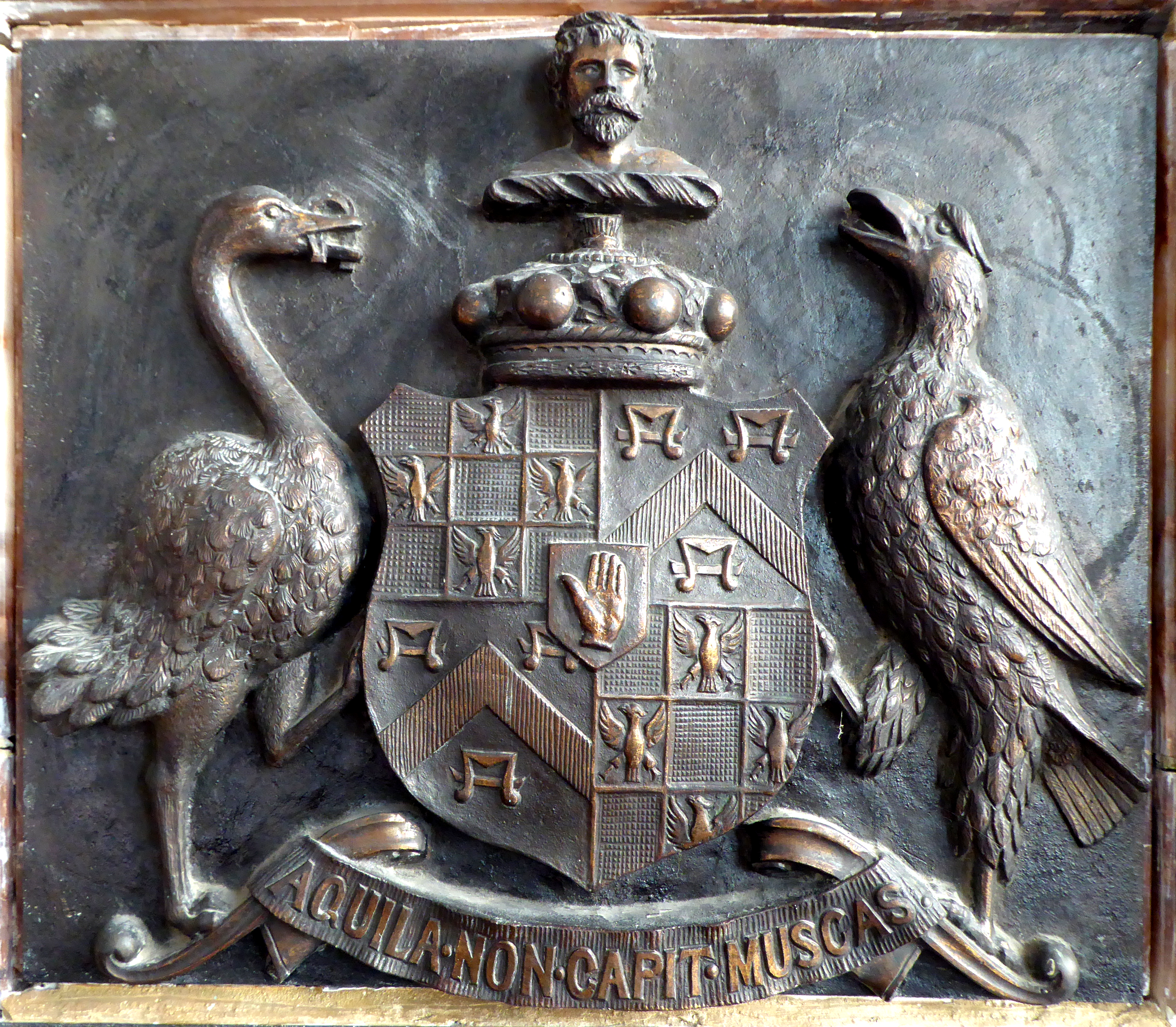
Heraldic achievement of John Yarde-Buller, 2nd Baron Churston (1846–1910), detail from 1901 Yarde-Buller memorial monument in Churston Ferrers Church, Devon

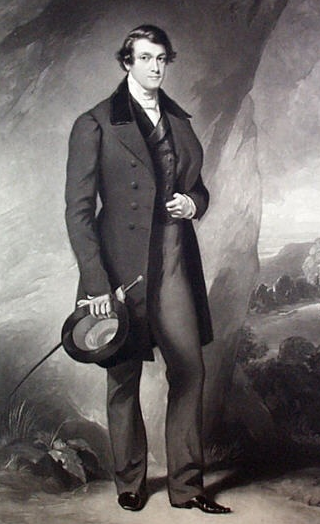
John Yarde-Buller, 1st Baron Churston (1799–1871)

Baron Churston, of Churston Ferrers and Lupton in the County of Devon, is a title in the Peerage of the United Kingdom. It was created in 1858 for the former Conservative Member of Parliament, Sir John Yarde, 3rd Baronet. He had earlier represented South Devon in the House of Commons. Two years later, in 1860, he assumed by Royal licence the additional surname of Buller. As of 2023 the titles are held by his great-great-great-great-grandson, the sixth Baron, who succeeded his father in that year.

The baronetcy, of Lupton House in the County of Devon, was created in the Baronetage of Great Britain on 13 January 1790 for the lawyer Sir Francis Buller. He was the son of James Buller. The first Baronet's son, the second Baronet, represented Totnes in the House of Commons. In 1800, he assumed by Royal licence the surname of Yarde. He was succeeded by his eldest son, the aforementioned third Baronet, who was elevated to the peerage in 1858.

The Barons Churston are related to the Viscounts Dilhorne and the Aga Khans. Sir Edward Manningham-Buller, 1st Baronet, of Dilhorne, third son of Sir Francis Yarde, 2nd Baronet, of Churston Court, was the great-grandfather of Reginald Manningham-Buller, 1st Viscount Dilhorne. The Hon. Joan Yarde-Buller, daughter of the third Baron Churston, married Prince Aly Khan and became Princess Tajuddawlah Aga Khan. The sixth Baron is a second cousin of her grandson Aga Khan V.

The family seat is Yowlestone House, near Tiverton, Devon.

== Buller, Yarde-Buller baronets, of Lupton House (1790) ==
- Sir Francis Buller, 1st Baronet (1746–1800)
- Sir Francis Buller-Yarde-Buller, 2nd Baronet (1767–1833)
- John Yarde-Buller, 3rd Baronet (1799–1871) (created Baron Churston in 1858)

== Barons Churston (1858) ==
- John Yarde-Buller, 1st Baron Churston (1799–1871)
- John Yarde-Buller, 2nd Baron Churston (1846–1910)
- John Reginald Lopes Yarde-Buller, 3rd Baron Churston (1873–1930)
- Richard Francis Roger Yarde-Buller, 4th Baron Churston (1910–1991)
- John Francis Yarde-Buller, 5th Baron Churston (1934–2023)
- Benjamin Francis Anthony Yarde-Buller, 6th Baron Churston (born 1974)

The heir apparent is the present holder's son, Hon. Joseph Francis Yarde-Buller (born 2004).

== See also ==
- Aga Khan IV, the 3rd Baron's grandson
- Viscount Dilhorne
