= Puslinch, Devon =

Historic estate in Devon, England

Coordinates: 50.340°N 4.011°W

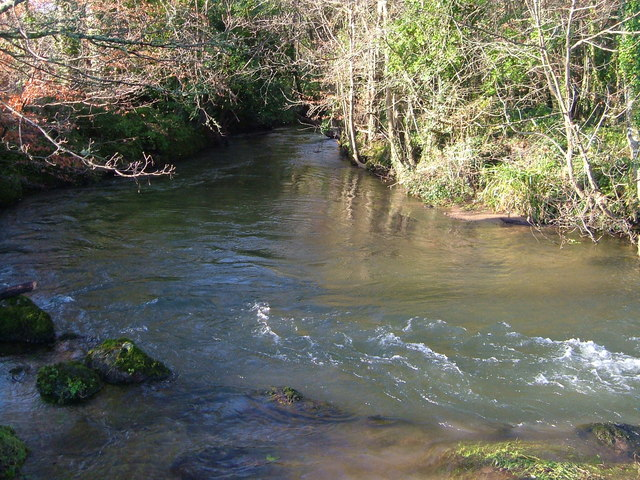
River Yealm at Puslinch

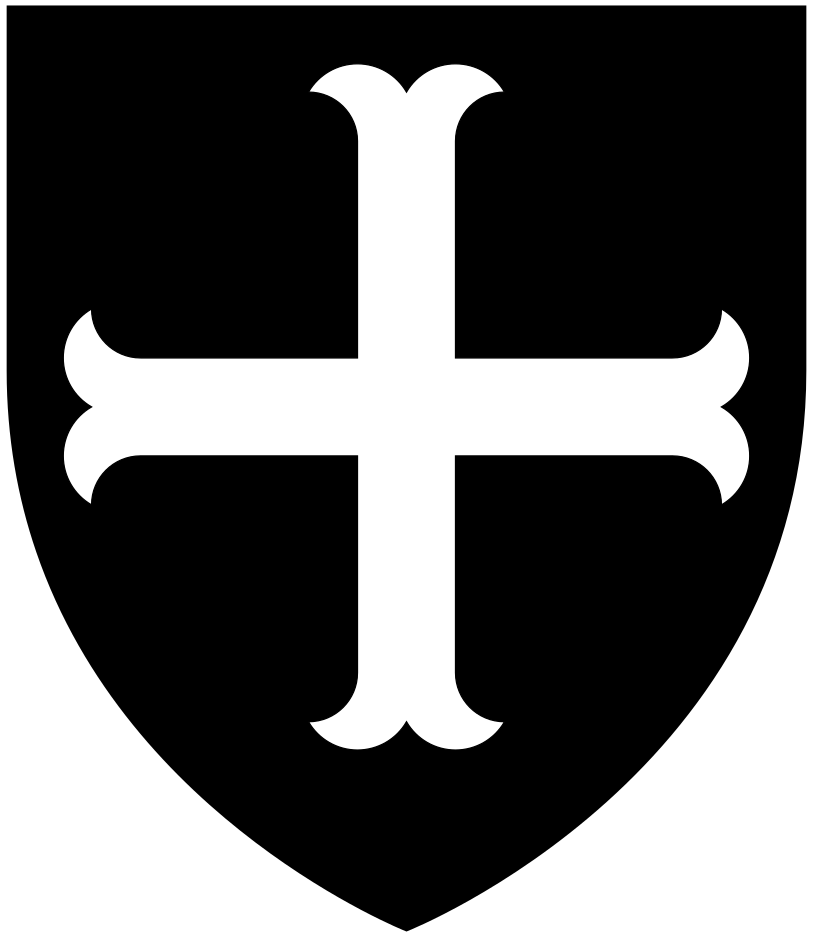
Arms of Upton: Sable, a cross moline argent A younger branch of the family later settled at Lupton

Puslinch is a small but ancient rural locality to the south of Yealmpton village in the South Hams district of the county of Devon, England. The name Puslich or Posylynch means "Pugh's land".

Its most famous landmark is Puslinch House, a Georgian mansion owned for generations by the Yonge family. Previous to that the estate was owned by the Poslylinch, Mohun and Upton families and then from 1718 the Yonges who had the current house built following the marriage of John Yonge and Mary Upton. The earlier medieval house still exists in the grounds as a country cottage. All these families were connected by marriage.

The style is said to be that of Christopher Wren. However he almost certainly was not the architect if indeed there was an architect at all. Most likely it was "designed" by a local craftsman who may perhaps have worked under Wren.

The following is extracted from Polewhele's History of Devonshire, British Library 942.3/5, first published between 1793 and 1806.

"Old Puslinch was inhabited by the family of Uptons or Uppetons, as sometimes spelt for several centuries, till at the beginning of this century it fell into the joint possession of two daughters, Elizabeth and Mary, the latter of whom in this century married James Yonge, surgeon of Plymouth by which means and purchase of the other sisters moiety, he became possessed of the whole, and it has since continued in his family. The above mentioned James Yonge on his marriage to Mary Upton built the house, which is now called Puslinch. It is a large well built brick house, on which was expended 9000 to 10,000 pounds. It has been completed between 60 and 70 years. He purchased also the manor of Puslinch and the perpetuity of the rectory of Newton off the Duke of Leeds. Puslinch House stands on the northern border of the Parish, overlooking the river about a 100 yards to the eastward of the old house, and on a rising ground, and seem about midway from the east and west extreme of the parish. A little detached from the old house stood a chapel of considerable size, as a private chapel: It had been time immemorial been used as an out house for the farm, it is very indifferently built, and was much injured by a large tree falling across it, that it has lately been entirely removed. In all probability a field in the midst of the Puslinch estate and another in that of Collaton containing about 20 acres, was appropriated to the maintenance of the service, one being called Parsons Headon and one being called Parsons Park."

Puslinch House

Other scenic features include a farm, a chapel, and a bridge over the River Yealm, notable for the extent of shelter that its steep sides and natural topography offer.
