= Amyn Aga Khan =

Philanthropist and brother of Aga Khan IV

Prince Amyn Muhammad Aga Khan
- أمين آغا خان
- Born: 12 September 1937; Geneva, Switzerland
- Citizenship: United Kingdom; Switzerland; Portugal
- Education: Institut Le Rosey
- Alma mater: Harvard University
- Occupations: Philanthropist; Businessman; Socialite
- Parents: Prince Aly Khan (father); Joan Yarde-Buller (mother)
- Relatives: Aga Khan IV (brother)
- Family: Fatimid Dynasty

Chairman of the Aga Khan Museum
- Incumbent
- Assumed office 2006

Prince Amyn Muhammad Aga Khan (Persian: امین محمد آغا خان; born 12 September 1937) is philanthropist, socialite and art patron. He is the son of Prince Aly Khan and Joan Yarde-Buller and the younger brother of Karim al-Husseini, Aga Khan IV.

== Early life and education ==
Amyn was born on 12 September 1937 in Geneva. Like his elder brother, he attended the Institut Le Rosey and Harvard College. He graduated from Harvard in 1960 with an A.B. magna cum laude in literature and economics. Amyn further pursued graduate studies in comparative literature at Harvard, receiving an A.M. in comparative literature in 1963 whilst also studying at the New England Conservatory. During his studies, he was additionally engaged as a graduate instructor in French.

== Professional activities ==
After completing his graduate studies, he worked at the United Nations Secretariat for the Department of Economic and Social Affairs from 1964 until 1968, after which time he took on leadership roles in a variety of Ismaili institutions. On 7 December 1974, he was invested as Chief Scout of the Ismaili Scouts Association in a ceremony in Karachi. As of 2006, he is chairman of the executive committee of the Aga Khan Fund for Economic Development (AKFED) and of Tourism Promotion Services, parent company of the Serena Hotels chain and chairman of the Board of the Directors of the Aga Khan Museum. In December 2015, he was accredited as the personal representative of the Aga Khan to Bangladesh. He has variously been a member of the Acquisitions Committee of the Louvre Museum, Chairman of the Friends of the Domaine de Chantilly, a trustee of the World Monuments Fund, and a director of the Silk Road Project. Despite his public engagements, he remains a private figure.

== Awards ==
Amyn Aga Khan received the Medal of Honour of Porto City in a ceremony that took place on 9 July 2019. Amyn Aga Khan was awarded the city's Medal of Honour by the Mayor of the Porto Municipality, Rui Moreira, who presided over a ceremony at the Casa do Roseiral, in the Gardens of the Palacio de Cristal. The medal was presented in honour of "a great patron of the arts."

== Honours ==
- France: Officier de la Légion d'honneur in 2025.
