= John Yarde-Buller, 3rd Baron Churston =

British peer and soldier (1873–1930)

Lieutenant The Right Honourable The Lord Churston OBE, MVO
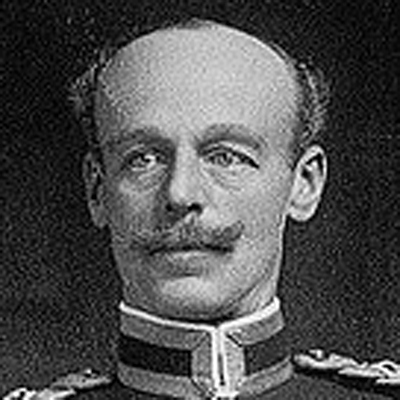
- Yarde-Buller, 1900

Personal details
- Born: John Reginald Lopes Yarde-Buller; 9 November 1873
- Died: 19 April 1930 (aged 56)
- Spouse: Denise Orme (m. 1907; div. 1928)
- Children: Joan Yarde-Buller; Richard Yarde-Buller, 4th Baron Churston; John Reginald Henry; Denise Grosvenor, Baroness Ebury; Lydia Russell, Duchess of Bedford; Primrose Cadogan, Countess Cadogan
- Parent(s): John Yarde-Buller, 2nd Baron Churston; Barbara Yelverton
- Relatives: John Buller (grandfather); Hastings Yelverton (grandfather); Barbara Yelverton, Marchioness of Hastings (grandmother); Aga Khan IV (grandson)
- Education: Winchester College

Military service
- Service: British Army
- Battles/wars: Second Boer War

John Reginald Lopes Yarde-Buller, 3rd Baron Churston OBE, MVO (9 November 1873 – 19 April 1930) was a British peer and soldier. He was the maternal grandfather of the Aga Khan IV, leader of the Nizari Ismailis, a Shia Muslim denomination.

== Early life ==
Yarde-Buller was born on 9 November 1873. He was the only son of the John Yarde-Buller, 2nd Baron Churston and Barbara Yelverton. His mother was the only child of Sir Hastings Yelverton and the 20th Baroness Grey de Ruthyn.

He was educated at Winchester College.

== Career ==
Yarde-Buller was commissioned a second-lieutenant in the Scots Guards on 8 April 1896 and promoted to lieutenant on 13 April 1898. Following the outbreak of the Second Boer War in late 1899, Yarde-Buller was with the 2nd Battalion of his regiment as it left Southampton for South Africa on the SS Britannic in March 1900. On arrival, the battalion was attached to the 16th Infantry Brigade serving as part of the 8th Division under Sir Leslie Rundle. Yarde-Buller was present at operations in the Orange River Colony May–November 1900, including the action at Biddulphsberg in May 1900 and Wittebergen in July 1900.

After his return from the war, he was appointed aide-de-camp to The Lord Curzon, Viceroy of India in January 1902, and promoted to captain on 23 April 1902. He served in India until the following year, then as ADC to The Duke of Connaught from 1904 to 1906. He later became a lieutenant-colonel in the short-lived 3rd Resident Battalion of the Scots Guards.

== Personal life ==
On 24 April 1907, he married the music hall singer Jessie Denise Orme Smither, only daughter of Alfred John Smither. Before their divorce in 1928, they had six children, most of whom were known for their high-profile marriages and divorces:

- Hon. Joan Barbara Yarde-Buller (1908–1997), who married G/Capt Loel Guinness in 1927. They divorced in 1936 and she remarried to Prince Aly Khan. They too divorced, in 1949, and she married, thirdly, to the 2nd Viscount Camrose.
- Richard Francis Roger Yarde-Buller, 4th Baron Churston (1910–1991), who married three times.
- Hon. John Reginald Henry Yarde-Buller (1915–1962), soldier who married Guendolen Osborn Roots, daughter of Rev. Charles Roots, in 1939.
- Hon. Denise Margaret Yarde-Buller (1916–2005), who married the 5th Baron Ebury before divorcing in 1954.
- Hon. Lydia Yarde-Buller (1917–2006), who married John Russell, 13th Duke of Bedford.
- Hon. Primrose Lillian Yarde-Buller (1918–1970), who married the 7th Earl Cadogan before divorcing in 1960.

In 1910, Yarde-Buller inherited his father's title and he and his wife divorced in 1928. In 1926. When he died on 19 April 1930, his eldest son inherited his title. Lady Churston later married and divorced Theodore William Wessel, the former Danish chargé d'affaires in Chile, before marrying the 7th Duke of Leinster in 1946.

== Ancestry ==
Ancestors of John Yarde-Buller, 3rd Baron Churston

8. John Yarde-Buller, 1st Baron Churston (1799–1871)
4. Hon. John Yarde Buller (1823–1867)
9. Elizabeth Wilson-Patten (d. 1857)
2. John Yarde-Buller, 2nd Baron Churston; (1846–1910)
10. Edward Sacheverell Chandos-Pole; (1792–1863)
5. Charlotte Chandos-Pole (1822–1895)
11. Anna Maria Wilmot
1. John Yarde-Buller, 3rd Baron Churston (1873–1930)
12. John Joseph Henry
6. Sir Hastings Reginald Yelverton; (1808–1878)
13. Lady Emily Elizabeth FitzGerald; (1778–1856)
3. Hon. Barbara Yelverton; (1849–1924)
14. Henry Yelverton, 19th Baron Grey de Ruthyn; (1780–1810)
7. Barbara Rawdon-Hastings, 20th Baroness Grey de Ruthyn; (1810–1858)
15. Anna Maria Kellam (1792–1875)

Peerage of the United Kingdom
Preceded by John Yarde-Buller	Baron Churston; 1910–1930	Succeeded by Richard Yarde-Buller
