= Churston Ferrers =

Village in Devon, England

Coordinates: 50.400°N 3.557°W

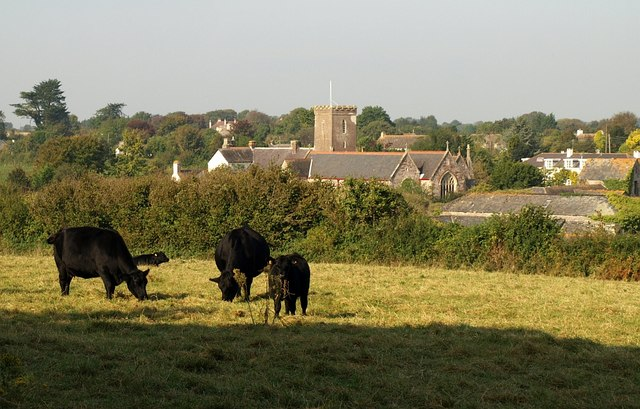
- Churston Ferrers, with St Mary's Church and Churston Court (left, west of church), viewed from south-east

- Location within Devon
- OS grid reference: SX9056
- Unitary authority: Torbay
- Ceremonial county: Devon
- Region: South West
- Country: England
- Sovereign state: United Kingdom
- Post town: BRIXHAM
- Postcode district: TQ5
- Dialling code: 01803
- Police: Devon and Cornwall
- Fire: Devon and Somerset
- Ambulance: South Western
- UK Parliament: Totnes

Churston Ferrers is an area and former civil parish, in the borough of Torbay, Devon, England, situated between the south coast towns of Paignton and Brixham. Today it is administered by local government as the Churston-with-Galmpton ward of the Torbay unitary authority area. It contains the coastal village of Churston, the now larger village of Galmpton and the Broadsands area.

The place-name 'Churston Ferrers' is first attested in the Domesday Book of 1086, where it appears as Cercetone, meaning 'church town or settlement'. The manor was held by Hugh de Fereris in 1303, according to Feudal Aids records, giving the second part of the name.

Churston Ferrers was a civil parish in the Totnes Rural District until 1 April 1968 when the parish was abolished. The more built-up northern part of the parish, including the village itself, became part of the new parish and county borough of Torbay. The more rural southern part was transferred to the parish of Kingswear.

Churston residents tend to associate mostly with Brixham, though those in the northern part of the Churston-with-Galmpton ward often think of themselves as part of Paignton.

Churston railway station is on the Paignton and Dartmouth Steam Railway from which steam trains run daily. It is served by the frequent "Hop 12" service between Brixham and Newton Abbot operated by Stagecoach South West. In Churston Ferrers is the selective Grammar School Churston Ferrers Grammar School.

The president of Churston Ferrers golf club was Ray Reardon, the Welsh six-time world snooker champion and former world number one snooker player. Churston Court, the former manor house of Churston Ferrers and today a hotel, is a Grade II* listed building situated to the immediate west of the parish church. Within the parish, off the Brixham Road, is situated Lupton House, a Palladian Country house. Both houses were seats of the Yarde-Buller family, created Baron Churston in 1858.

== Cultural references ==
The novelist Agatha Christie was a regular guest of Lord Churston at Churston Court. In her Hercule Poirot mystery The A.B.C. Murders, the third murder takes place in Churston. Agatha Christie commissioned the installation of a stained glass window on the eastern side of the parish church in the 1950s.
