= William Cadogan, 7th Earl Cadogan =

British peer

Earl Cadogan in 1969.

William Gerald Charles Cadogan, 7th Earl Cadogan, MC, DL (13 February 1914 – 4 July 1997) was a British peer and professional soldier.

== Early life ==
Born on 13 February 1914, he was the eldest son of Gerald Cadogan, 6th Earl Cadogan and his wife Lilian Cadogan. He was educated at Eton College, an all-boys public boarding school in Eton, Berkshire.

He inherited his titles on the death of his father on 4 October 1933, his family seat at Culford Park was sold in 1935 and became Culford School. On 12 May 1937, as a peer of the realm, he attended the Coronation of George VI and Elizabeth.

== Military service ==
Having attended Royal Military College, Sandhurst, Cadogan was commissioned on 1 February 1934 as a second lieutenant in the Coldstream Guards, British Army. He transferred to the Supplementary Reserve of Officers on 3 June 1936, thereby becoming a part-time soldier. He was promoted to lieutenant on 1 February 1937. On 12 April 1937, he transferred from the Coldstream Guards to the Royal Wiltshire Yeomanry, Territorial Army, in the rank of second lieutenant.

Cadogan saw active service during the Second World War. On 4 February 1943, as a lieutenant (temporary captain), he was awarded the Military Cross (MC) "in recognition of gallant and distinguished services in the Middle East".

On 1 May 1947, he transferred from the Reserve of Officers to the Royal Wiltshire Yeomanry, a Territorial Army unit of the Royal Armoured Corps and was promoted to lieutenant colonel. He relinquished his commission on 1 May 1948 and was granted the honorary rank of lieutenant colonel.

== Later life ==
Cadogan held the office of Deputy Lieutenant (DL) of the County of London in 1958 and was Mayor of Chelsea in 1964.

On his death in 1997 his titles passed to his son Charles Gerald John Cadogan, 8th Earl Cadogan.

== Personal life ==
Cadogan married twice; firstly, on 11 June 1936 Primrose Lilian Yarde-Buller, daughter of John Reginald Lopes Yarde-Buller, 3rd Baron Churston of Churston Ferrers and Lupton and secondly Cecilia Margaret Hamilton-Wedderburn (10 March 1916 – 31 March 1999), daughter of Lt-Col. Henry Kellerman Hamilton-Wedderburn, on 13 January 1961. With his first wife he had four children, the eldest son of whom was his heir Charles Gerald John Cadogan, 8th Earl Cadogan.

He was a Freemason and served as the Pro Grand Master of the United Grand Lodge of England from 1969 until 1982.

Peerage of Great Britain
Preceded by Gerald Oakley Cadogan	Earl Cadogan; 1933–1997	Succeeded by Charles Gerald John Cadogan
