= John Yarde-Buller, 2nd Baron Churston =

British peer and soldier

John Yarde-Buller, 2nd Baron Churston (26 October 1846 – 30 November 1910) was a British peer and soldier.

The elder son of the Hon. John Yarde-Buller (eldest son of John Yarde-Buller, 1st Baron Churston) and of Charlotte, a daughter of Edward Sacheverell Chandos-Pole, of Radbourne, Derbyshire, he joined the Scots Fusilier Guards as an Ensign & Lieutenant on 5 April 1865 and was promoted to Lieutenant & Captain on 12 April 1869. He retired in 1871 when he succeeded to his grandfather's titles and estates (amounting to some eleven thousand acres), residing at Brook House, Marchington, Staffordshire. He then took a commission as a lieutenant in the part-time Staffordshire Yeomanry on 14 April 1875.

The family seat was at Churston Court, Devonshire, and Lord Churston served as a Justice of the Peace in that county. He was appointed a Captain in the 1st Devonshire Artillery Volunteers on 10 January 1877 and resigned his commission in the Staffordshire Yeomanry on 20 June 1877. He was granted the honorary rank of Major in the 1st Devonshire Artillery on 17 July 1886. He retired on 13 February 1895.

In 1872, he married Barbara, the only child of Admiral Sir Hastings Yelverton and of Barbara, 20th Baroness Grey de Ruthyn. They had three children:

- Hon John Reginald Lopes Yarde-Buller, born 9 November 1873
- Hon Barbara Lois Yarde-Buller, born 5 January 1875, died unmarried, 31 October 1945
- Hon Giles Yelverton Yarde-Buller, born 10 December 1875, died unmarried 9 September 1900

Lord Churston died on 30 November 1910 was succeeded by his surviving son, John, who became the 3rd Baron Churston. Lady Churston died on 1 October 1924.

He is the great-grandfather of Aga Khan IV.

== Notes ==
Peerage of the United Kingdom
| Preceded by John Yarde-Buller | Baron Churston; 1871–1910 | Succeeded by John Yarde-Buller |
