= Sidbury (disambiguation) =

Sidbury is a large village in Devon, England.

Sidbury may also refer to:

== Places ==
- Sidbury, Eastern Cape, a village in the Albany district, Eastern Cape, South Africa
- Sidbury, Shropshire, England, a village and civil parish
- Sidbury Castle, an Iron Age hillfort near Sidbury in Devon, England
- Sidbury Hill, site of a hillfort in Wiltshire, England
- Sidbury Manor, a privately owned mansion near Sidbury, Devon, England

== People with the surname ==
- Daniel Sidbury (born 1994), British wheelchair racer
- James Sidbury, American historian
- Lawrence Sidbury (born 1986), American football player
