= High Sheriff of Devon =

The High Sheriff of Devon is the Kings's representative for the County of Devon, a territory known as his/her bailiwick. Selected from three nominated people, they hold the office for one year. They have judicial, ceremonial and administrative functions and execute High Court Writs. The title was historically "Sheriff of Devon", but changed in 1974 to "High Sheriff of Devon".

== History ==
The office of Sheriff is the oldest under the Crown. It is over 1000 years old; it was established before the Norman Conquest. It remained first in precedence in the counties, until the reign of Edward VII, when an Order in Council in 1908 gave the Lord-Lieutenant the prime office under the Crown as the Sovereign's personal representative. Under the provisions of the Local Government Act 1972, on 1 April 1974 the office previously known as Sheriff was retitled High Sheriff. The High Sheriff remains the Sovereign's representative in the county for all matters relating to the Judiciary and the maintenance of law and order.

== Sheriffs of Devon ==
=== Before 1300 ===
Names indented are those of undersheriffs.

- ?–1066: Heche
- 1068–1096: Baldwin de Moeles (or de Brionne)
- T. R. W.: William fitz Baldwin
- 1100: Geoffrey de Mandeville
- 1116: Richard fitz Baldwin
- 29 September 1129: Geoffrey de Furnell.
- 1135–1136: Richard fitz Baldwin.
- 1137–1142: Adelise (Alice). – wife of Richard fitz Baldwin.
- 1142–?: Adelise (Alice).
- 29 September 1154: Richard de Redvers, 2nd Earl of Devon
- 29 September 1157: William de Boterellis
- 29 September 1161: Hugh de Ralegh
- 29 September 1167: Robert filius Bernardi
- Easter 1173: Reginald de Dunstanville, 1st Earl of Cornwall
  - 29 September 1174: Payne the Chaplain and Alan de Furnellis
- 1175: William Rufus
- Easter 1177: Hugh de Gundevilla
- 29 September 1179: William Brewer
- 29 September 1189: John, Count of Mortain
- Christmas 1193: Sir Richard Reynell
  - Christmas 1193: Henry de Furnell
- Michaelmas 1194: Sir Richard Reynell
  - Michaelmas 1195: Henry de Furnell
- Michaelmas 1198: John de Torrington and William of Wrotham
- Easter 1199: Hugh Bardulf
  - Easter 1199: Osbert FitzWilliam
- Easter 1200: William Brewer
- Michaelmas 1200: Ralph Morin
- Easter 1202: William Brewer
  - Easter 1201: Ralph de Mora
- Michaelmas 1209: Robert de Veteri Ponte
  - Michaelmas 1209: Eudo de Bello Campo
- 13 May 1215: Henry de la Pomeray
- 14 May 1215: Robert de Erlegh
- unknown: Robert de Courtenay
- 14 August 1217: William, Earl of Salisbury
- 30 March 1218: Robert de Alba Mara
- 8 May 1218: Robert de Courtenay
  - Michaelmas 1218: William de Lunet
- 12 June 1222: Walter le Poer
- 4 February 1224: William Brewer the younger
  - Christmas 1223: Roger de Langeford
- 20 October 1225: William de Ralega
- 10 November 1228: Roger la Zouch
  - Michaelmas 1229: Adam de Cerne
  - Michaelmas 1230: Ranulph de Cerne
- 17 April 1231: Thomas de Cyrencestria
  - Easter 1231: Thomas de la Wyle
- 11 July 1232: Peter de Rivall
- Michaelmas 1232: Thomas de la Wyle
- Michaelmas 1233: Robert de Vallibus
  - Michaelmas 1233: Richard de Langeford
- 15 January 1234: Peter de Russell
- 26 May 1234: Nicholas de Moels
  - Easter 1234: Walter of Bath
- 25 April 1236: Walter of Bath
- Easter 1251: William of Englefeld
- 25 May 1254: Ralph de Willington
- 29 April 1255: Gervase de Horton, apparently died in office and accounts rendered by his son Henry de Horton
- 28 March 1257: Robert le Peytevin, of Cridy
- 3 November 1258: William de Courtenay
- Michaelmas 1259: Ralph de Doddiscomb
- 9 July 1261: John de Muscegros
- Midsummer 1264: Hugh Peverel
- 22 October 1264: Ralph de Esse
- Michaelmas 1265: Ralph de Gorges
- 23 November 1267: William de Bykeley
- Easter 1270: Simon de Grindham
- 10 August 1270: Richard of Cornwall
- Christmas 1270: Roger de Pridias
  - Christmas 1270: Ralph de Teygnemue and John de Wilton, clerks
- Michaelmas 1271: Richard of Cornwall
  - Michaelmas 1271: Roger de Pridias
- 13 September 1273: Thomas del Pyn
- 13 October 1274: John Wiger, apparently died in office and accounts rendered by his son Henry Wiger
- 15 January 1277: Matthew de Eggleshill or de Eglesheyl
- 18 January 1278: Thomas del Pyn
- 25 October 1278: Warren de Sechevile
- 1 October 1280: Thomas del Pyn
- 13 May 1286: Robert de Wodton
- 17 May 1287: Matthew FitzJohn
- 16 October 1294: Gilbert de Knovill
  - Michaelmas 1296: Robert de Uppehaye and Richard de Brankescumb, clerks
- Michaelmas 1297: Gilbert de Knovill
  - Michaelmas 1298: Robert de Uppehaye and Richard de Brankescumb
- Michaelmas 1299: Gilbert de Knovill

=== 1300–1399 ===
- 1 October 1300: Thomas de Ralegh
- 16 April 1306: Ralph de Gorges
- 14 December 1307: Thomas de Ralegh
- 5 December 1308: Nicholas de Kirkham
- 19 June 1309: Nicholas de Tewkesbury
- 22 May 1311: Matthew de Furneux
- 16 January 1315: Robert de Horton
- 8 October 1316: Matthew de Clivedon
- 15 May 1318: Robert Bendyn
- 29 November 1318: John de Bikkebury or Bigbiry
- 12 October 1319: Robert Bendyn
- 16 June 1321: Nicholas de Cheigne or Cheyney
- 30 November 1321: John Inge
- 30 May 1322: Matthew de Crauthorne
- 1324: Walter Bathon
- 4 October 1325: James de Cokynton or Cockington
- 1326: Henry Tirell
- 15 February 1327: Roger Rodd
- 2 March 1327: James de Cokynton
- 19 February 1328: William de Chivereston
- 5 November 1328: William de Faucomberge
- 5 December 1330: Matthew de Crauthorne
- 20 September 1332: Reginald de Monte Forti
- 7 November 1333: William de Aumarle
- 7 Oct 1335: John de Chudelegh
- 3 November 1335: Hildebrand de London, ordered to surrender office on 5 December, as ineligible
- 9 April 1336: Peter de Veel
- 25 September 1337: John de Ralegh, of Beaudeport
- 28 January 1340–1341: John de Ralegh, of Charneys
- 16 March 1341: Roger Prideaux
- 2 May 1341: Henry Tirrell
- 27 March 1342: William Pipard
- 29 July 1343: William Chambernon
- 1 September 1343: John de la Ryvere
- 16 October 1343: Walter de Horton
- 4 November 1344: James de Cokynton
- 9 November 1344: John de Chiverston
- 26 November 1345: Walter de Horton
- 30 December 1345: Hervey Tirrell
- 16 January 1347: Thomas de Ralegh, on a pretended commission
- 22 February 1347: Richard Cogan
- 20 March 1347: Ralph Beaupel
- 28 April 1347: Ralph Bryt
- 7 February 1348: Almaric Fitz-Waryn
- 4 December 1350: Robert de Hach
- 8 November 1351: William Auncel
- 14 November 1353: John de Northcote
- 10 November 1354: Peter de Ralegh
- 7 February 1355: Richard Chaumbernoun
- 30 May 1356: John Daubernoun
- 20 November 1357: John Daumarle, of Flete
- 13 January 1358: William Atte Yeo
- 3 November 1358: Richard de Brankescombe
- 10 December 1361: Almaric Fitz Waryn
- 8 January 1362: Martin Fishacre
- 27 April 1364: William de Brightelee
- 10 November 1364: John Fitzpayne
- 5 December 1364: John Boys, of Halberton
- 17 November 1365: William Servyngton
- 16 November 1366: Richard de Brankescombe
- 26 November 1367: Thomas Chaumbernoun
- 27 November 1368: Richard Champernowne (died 1419)
- 5 November 1369: Richard Chiselden
- 29 November 1369: Thomas de Afton
- 28 November 1370: Richard Beaumont
- 5 November 1371: Nicholas Whyting
- 12 December 1372: Richard de Chiselden
- 17 November 1373: Sir John Daumarle
- 12 December 1374: Richard Brankescombe
- 4 October 1375: Nicholas de la Pomeroy
- 26 October 1376: Sir John Ralegh
- 7 November 1376: James Chudleigh
- 22 June 1377: Sir John Ralegh
- 26 November 1377: Richard de Chiselden (pleaded a charter of exemption from office)
- 12 December 1377: Sir John Daumarle
- 25 November 1378: John Fitz Payne
- 5 November 1379: Sir John Stretch
- 18 October 1380: Richard Stapledon
- 16 November 1380: John Keynes
- 14 December 1380: Walter Corneu or Cornu
- 1 November 1381: Richard Champernowne (died 1419)
- 24 November 1382: Richard Kendale
- 1 November 1383: Sir William de Ashthorp
- 11 December 1384: Sir James Chudleigh
- 20 October 1385: Richard Whitelegh
- 18 January 1387: Richard Champernowne (died 1419)
- 18 November 1387: Sir John Poulet
- 1 December 1388: Nicholas Kirkham
- 15 November 1389: Sir William Bonville
- 7 November 1390: William Carmynowe
- 21 October 1391: Sir John Grenville
- 18 October 1392: Thomas Ralegh
- 7 November 1393: Walter Cornu
- 13 November 1393: Sir Thomas Brooke
- 11 November 1394: Sir James Chudleigh
- 9 November 1395: William Ferrers, of Chircheton
- 1 December 1396: William Malerbe
- 3 November 1397: Thomas Peverel
- 18 December 1398: William Beaumont
- 30 September 1399: Sir John Pomeroy
- 3 November 1399: John Keynes

=== 1400–1499 ===
- 24 November 1400: Sir Thomas Pomeroy
- 8 November 1401: John Herle
- 29 November 1042: John Wyke, of Neanyde
- 5 November 1403: Thomas Gorges
- 22 April 1404: John Beville
- 22 October 1404: John Chusilden
- 22 November 1405: John Cole
- 5 November 1406: Sir John Herle
- 30 November 1407: Edmund Pyne
- 15 November 1408: Sir William Cheney
- 4 November 1409: Sir Robert Chalons
- 29 November 1410: Sir Thomas Pomeroy
- 10 December 1411: Richard Piperell
- 3 November 1412: Thomas Beaumont
- 6 November 1413: Sir Thomas Pomeroy
- 19 May 1414: Sir John Arundell
- 1 December 1415: John Beville
- 30 November 1416: Sir William Talbot
- 10 November 1417: Stephen Derneford
- 4 November 1418: Sir Hugh Courtenay, the elder
- 23 November 1419: Thomas Beaumont
- 16 November 1420: Sir Robert Chalons
- 1 May 1422: Thomas Beaumont
- 14 February 1423: Sir William Bonville
- 13 November 1423: Richard Hankeford
- 6 November 1424: Sir Thomas Brooke
- 15 January 1426: Sir William Palton
- 12 December 1426: John Baunfeld
- 7 November 1427: Sir Thomas Beaumont
- 4 November 1428: Robert Hill
- 10 February 1430: James Chuddelegh
- 5 November 1430: John Bosom
- 26 November 1431: Edward Pomeroy
- 5 November 1432: Edmund Pyne
- 5 November 1433: John Cheney, of Pinhoe
- 3 November 1434: Sir Thomas Stawell
- 7 November 1435: Roger Chaumbernon
- 8 November 1436: Sir Thomas Beaumont
- 7 November 1437: Sir Thomas Arundell
- 3 November 1438: James Chidlegh or Chidelegh
- 5 November 1439: Sir William Beauchamp
- 4 November 1440: Robert Burton
- 4 November 1441: Sir William Wadham
- 6 November 1442: Richard Yarde
- 4 November 1443: John Cheney, of Pinhoe
- 6 November 1444: Sir John Blewet
- 4 November 1445: Nicholas Broughton
- 4 November 1446: Henry Fortescue
- 9 November 1447: Thomas Buttokessyde
- 9 November 1448: Hugh Stucley
- 20 December 1449: James Chudley or Chiddelegh
- 3 December 1450: Robert Burton
- 8 November 1451: Sir Edward Hill
- 8 November 1452: Henry Fortescue
- 5 November 1453: John Cheney, of Pinhoe
- 4 November 1454: Richard Hals
- 4 November 1455: Andrew Hillersdon
- 17 November 1456: Edward Langford
- 7 November 1457: John Nanfan
- 7 November 1458: Richard Hals
- 7 November 1459: Sir Baldwin Fulford
- 7 November 1460: John Dynham
- 7 November 1461: John Cheney, of Pinhoe
- 5 November 1463: Richard Chichester
- 5 November 1464: John Arundel
- Michaelmas 1465: Christopher Worseley
- 5 November 1466: William Denys
- 5 November 1467: Philip Beaumont
- 5 November 1468: Richard Chichester
- 5 November 1469: Nicholas Carewe
- 6 November 1470: (Sir) Philip Courtenay
- 9 November 1471: Philip Copleston
- 9 November 1472: John Cheney, of Pinhoe
- 5 November 1473: Richard Pomeray
- 7 November 1474: Richard Chichester
- 5 November 1475: Otes Gilbert
- 5 November 1476: Charles Dinham
- 5 November 1477: John Sapcot
- 5 November 1478: Edward Courtenay
- 5 November 1479: Halnatheus Maleverer
- 5 November 1480: Sir Robert Willoughby
- 5 November 1481: Sir Giles Daubeney
- 5 November 1482: Sir William Courtenay
- 6 November 1483: Halnatheus Maleverer
- 5 November 1484: Sir Thomas Maleverer
- 12 September 1485: Sir John Halwell
- 5 November 1486: Sir Richard Edgcumbe
- 4 November 1487: Sir Robert Willoughby
- 4 November 1488: Roger Holland
- 5 November 1489: Sir John Halwell
- 5 November 1490: Sir William Stoner
- 5 November 1491: Walter Enderby
- 26 November 1492: Richard Pomeray
- 7 November 1493: Roger Holland
- 5 November 1494: Sir Piers (or Peter) Edgcumbe
- 5 November 1495: John Fortescue
- 5 November 1496: Sir William Carew
- 5 November 1497: Sir Piers (or Peter) Edgcumbe
- 5 November 1498: Roger Holland
- 11 November 1499: James Chudlegh

=== 1500–1599 ===
- 15 November 1500: Richard Whiteley
- 5 November 1501: Nicholas Wadham
- 8 November 1502: Richard Halwell
- 18 November 1503: John Fortescue
- 5 November 1504: William Marwood
- 1 December 1505: Sir John Kirkham
- 27 November 1506: John Fortescue
- 3 December 1507: Thomas Denys
- 14 November 1509: John Crocker
- 9 November 1510: Richard Coffin
- 8 November 1511: Thomas Goodman
- 7 November 1512: Thomas Denys
- 9 November 1513: William Carew
- 7 November 1514: Sir Nicholas Wadham
- 5 November 1515: Sir John Shylston
- 10 November 1516: John Speke
- 9 November 1517: Sir Piers Edgcumbe
- 8 November 1518: Sir Thomas Denys
- 8 November 1519: Ralph Pexsall
- 6 November 1520: Sir Thomas Stucley
- 3 February 1522: Sir William Courtenay
- 12 November 1522: Sir Thomas Denys
- 13 November 1523: Sir John Kirkham
- 10 November 1524: Sir John Basset
- 26 November 1525: Sir William Courtenay
- 7 November 1526: Sir Philip Champernowne
- 16 November 1527: Sir Thomas Denys
- 7 November 1528: Sir Piers Edgcumbe
- 9 November 1529: John Chamond
- 11 November 1530: Sir George St Leger
- 9 November 1531: Sir Thomas Denys
- 20 November 1532: Richard Grenville
- 17 November 1533: Sir William Courtenay
- 14 November 1534: John Fulford
- 22 November 1535: (Sir) Hugh Pollard
- 27 November 1536: Sir George Carew
- 14 November 1537: Richard Pollard
- 15 November 1538: John Chamond
- 17 November 1539: Sir Hugh Pollard
- 17 November 1540: Sir John Fulford
- 27 November 1541: Sir Hugh Paulet
- 22 November 1542: Sir George Carew
- 23 November 1543: Sir Richard Edgcumbe
- 16 November 1544: Hugh Stucley
- 22 November 1545: Sir Hugh Pollard
- 23 November 1546: Sir Peter Carew
- 27 November 1547: Sir Gawain Carew
- 3 December 1548: Sir Peter Courtenay
- 12 November 1549: Sir Thomas Denys
- 11 November 1550: John Chichester
- 11 November 1551: Richard Chidley or Chudleigh
- 10 November 1552: Sir Richard Edgecumbe
- 8 November 1553: Sir Thomas Denys
- 14 November 1554: James Courteney
- 15 November 1555: Robert Carey
- 13 November 1556: Sir John Fulford
- 16 November 1557: Sir Robert Dennis
- 23 November 1558: Thomas Southcote
- 9 November 1559: Sir Arthur Champernowne
- 12 November 1560: Sir John St Leger
- 8 November 1561: Christopher Copleston
- 16 May 1562: John Mallet
- 19 November 1562: Richard Fortescue
- 8 November 1563: Richard Duke
- 9 November 1564: Thomas Monk
- 16 November 1565: Peter Edgcumbe
- 18 November 1566: Lewis Stucley
- 18 November 1567: Sir Robert Dennis
- 18 November 1568: William Strowde
- 12 November 1569: John Malet
- 13 November 1570: Thomas Southcote
- 14 November 1571: John Parker
- 13 November 1572: Sir John Gilbert
- 10 November 1573: Thomas Carew, of Haccombe
- 15 November 1574: (Sir) Arthur Bassett
- 15 November 1575: Sir John Fulford
- 13 November 1576: Richard Bampfield
- 27 November 1577: John Chichester
- 17 November 1578: Roger Prideaux of Soldon
- 23 November 1579: Sir William Courtenay
- 21 November 1580: John Clifton
- 27 November 1581: George Kirkham
- 6 February 1582: John Fitz
- 5 December 1582: John Fortescue
- 25 November 1583: Lord Edward Seymour
- 19 November 1584: Richard Reynell
- 27 July 1585: Humphrey Speccot
- 14 November 1586: William Kirkham
- 4 December 1587: George Carey, of Clovelly
- 25 November 1588: Hugh Pollard
- 24 November 1589: William Carew, of Haccombe
- 24 November 1590: Thomas Ridgeway
- 25 November 1591: Henry Rolle, of Stevenstone
- 16 November 1592: Richard Champernown
- 26 November 1593: William Strode
- 21 November 1594: Sir Thomas Denys
- 27 November 1595: Edward Seymour
- 22 November 1596: William Walrond
- 25 November 1597: John Copleton
- 28 November 1598: William Fortescue
- 9 February 1599: Henry Rolle
- 2 December 1599: Thomas Ridgeway

=== 1600–1699 ===
- 24 November 1600: Edmund Parker
- 2 December 1601: Thomas Hele
- 7 December 1602: William Pole
- 1 December 1603: Sir Amyas Bampfylde
- 5 November 1604: John Drake
- 2 February 1606: Edward Seymour
- 17 November 1606: William Abbot
- 9 November 1607: Robert Rolle
- 12 November 1608: John Acland
- late 1609: William Crymes
- 6 November 1610: Hugh Acland
- late 1611: Sir Thomas Wise
- late 1612: Sir Edward Giles
- late 1613: Sir George Smyth
- late 1614: Sir John Speccott
- 6 November 1615: John Giffard of Halsbury
- 11 November 1616: Sir George Southcote.
- 6 November 1617: Thomas Hele of Flete House (son of Thomas, Sheriff 1601).
- 9 November 1618: Sir Warwick Hele of Wembury (grandson of Thomas, Sheriff 1601)
- late 1619: Christopher Savery of Totnes and Shilston.
- 6 November 1620: Sampson Hele of Gnaton, Newton Ferrers.
- late 1621: Edmund Parker.
- 7 November 1622: Edmund Fortescue of Fallapitt House.
- late 1623: Henry Tothill.
- late 1624: Sir Simon Leach (1567–1638) of Cadeleigh.
- late 1625: Nicholas Fry.
- late 1626: John Nortcote. John Northcote (1570-1632) or his son Sir John Northcote, 1st Baronet of Hayne, Newton St Cyres.
- 4 November 1627: Walter Yonge.
- late 1628: Sir Henry Rosewell.
- late 1629: Sir John Davie, 1st Baronet of Creedy House, Sandford.
- 7 November 1630: Henry Ashford.
- late 1631: Edmund Arscott or Arthur Arscot of Tedcot.
- late 1632: Sir Francis Drake, 1st Baronet of Buckland Abbey.
- 10 November 1633: John Bampfield of Poltimore.
- 5 November 1634: Sir Thomas Drewe.
- late 1635: Sir Thomas Hele, 1st Baronet of Flete House, Fleet Damerel.
- 3 October 1636: Denys Rolles of Bicton.
- 30 September 1637: Thomas Wise of Sydenham, Marystow and Mount Wise, Stoke Damerel.
- 4 November 1638: Sir John Pole, 1st Baronet of Shute, Devon and later of Colcombe Castle, Colyton.
- late 1639: Sir Nicholas Martyn.
- late 1640: Nicholas Putt.
- late 1641: Richard I Culme (1569–1649) of Canonsleigh Abbey & Molland-Champson.
- 1643. No Sheriff recorded in Hughes. Hughes notes that from 1638-1643 records of the appointments no longer exist.
- 15 July 1644: John Lutterell.
- late 1645: Sir Francis Drake, 2nd Baronet.
- 1 December 1646: William Bastard.
- 16 November 1647: Edmund Parker.
- 23 November 1648: John Clobery.
- 7 November 1649: Robert Rolle of Heanton Satchville, Petrockstowe.
- 7 November 1650: William Putt.
- 4 November 1651: William Morice of Werrington.
- 12 November 1652: George Southcott of Buckland.
- 10 November 1653: Peter Bevis.
- late 1654 to late 1657: Sir John Coplestone.
- late 1657: Robert Duke.
- late 1658: John Blackmore. or possibly in 1657
- late 1659: Matthew Hele of Holwell.
- 5 November 1660: Sir Coplestone Bampfylde, 2nd Baronet of Poltimore.
- late 1661 Sir Peter Prideaux, 2nd Baronet.
- late 1662: Sir John Drake, 1st Baronet of Great Trill, Axminster.
- late 1663: John Willoughbye.
- late 1664: Sir William Courtenay, 1st Baronet.
- 12 November 1665: John Kelland.
- 7 November 1666: Henry Northleigh.
- 6 November 1667: James Tuckfield.
- 6 November 1668: Richard Cable.
- 11 November 1669: James Rodd.
- 4 November 1670: Sir John Davie, 2nd Baronet.
- 9 November 1671: Henry Walter.
- 11 November 1672: Sir Thomas Putt, 1st Baronet. of Gittisham
- 12 November 1673: Sir Peter Lear, 1st Baronet. of Lindridge House
- 5 November 1674: Josias Calmady. of Langdon, Wembury
- 11 November 1674: John Arscott, snr., of Tetcott
- 6 October 1675: John Arscott, jnr in place of his deceased father.
- 15 November 1675: Edmund Parker.
- 10 November 1676: William Bastard.
- 15 November 1677: Thomas Reynell.
- 14 November 1678: Richard Duke, of Otterton.
- 13 November 1679: Sir Edward Seymour, 3rd Baronet.
- 4 November 1680: Henry Northleigh, of Peamore, Exminster
- 4 November 1680: Henry Northleigh.
- 10 November 1681: Sir Courtenay Pole, 2nd Baronet of Shute.
- 23 November 1682: John Rolle of Stevenstone.
- 12 November 1683: Sir George Carew.
- 26 November 1683: John Kelland of Painsford, Ashprington.
- 20 November 1684: Richard Coffin (1623–1700) of Portledge, Alwington.
- 20 November 1685: William Bragge of Sadborow, Thorncombe.
- 25 November 1686: Sir William Walrond.
- 5 December 1687: John Rowe of Kingston, died in office.
- 8 November 1688: Thomas Drewe of Broadhembury.
- 18 March 1689: Sir John Davie, 3rd Baronet.
- 18 November 1689: Francis Fulford.
- 27 November 1690: Sir Hugh Acland, 5th Baronet of Killerton.
- 14 December 1691: Sampson Hele. (uncle of Matthew, Sheriff in 1660).
- 17 November 1692: George Prestwood.
- 16 November 1693: Sir Christopher Savery.
- 6 December 1694: Josias Calmady of Leawood, Bridestowe.
- 5 December 1695: John Doble.
- 3 December 1696: Jasper Radclife.
- 16 December 1697: Sir William Davie, 4th Baronet of Creedy House.
- 6 January 1699: Southcutt Lutterell.
- 19 January 1699: Sir John Elwill, 1st Baronet of Polsloe House, near Exeter.

=== 1700–1799 ===
- 20 November 1699: John Davie or Davis
- 28 November 1700: Arthur Tremayne, of Sydenham
- 1 January 1702: Sir John Rogers, 1st Baronet, of Wiscombe and Blachford
- 3 December 1702: George Parker
- 2 December 1703: William Harris, of Hayne
- 21 December 1704: David Long, of Kell
- 3 December 1705: Richard Ackland
- 14 November 1706: Roger Woolacombe
- 20 November 1707: Peter West
- 13 December 1708: Sir John Lear, 3rd Baronet
- 27 January 1709: Richard Triste or Nicholas Trist, of Bowden House, Totnes (Mayor of Totnes in 1718 & 1737).
- 1 December 1709: Phillip Andrews.
- 5 January 1710: Sir John Lear, 3rd Baronet
- 24 November 1710: Arthur Bassett
- 13 December 1711: John Woolcombe, of Pitton, Yealmpton
- 11 December 1712: John Shapleigh
- 30 November 1713: James Smith
- 16 November 1714: Arthur Arscott, of Tedcott
- 22 November 1715: Richard Nutcomb, of Nutcomb
- 12 November 1716: Sir Henry Langford, 3rd Baronet
- 21 December 1717: Francis Sheppard
- 21 December 1718: Thomas Cholwicke
- 6 January 1719: William Cholwicke the Younger
- 3 December 1719: William Bickford, of Dunsland
- 3 January 1721: William Hull, of Exmouth
- 14 December 1721: Samuel Addis
- 11 December 1722: Hugh Stafford, of Pynes
- 7 January 1724: Robert Fry, of Yarty
- 10 December 1724: Adrian Sweet, of Modbury
- 13 January 1726: Thomas Balle, of Mamhead, near Chudleigh
- 29 November 1726: William Tucker, of Coryton, Kilmington, Devon
- 16 December 1727: Coulson Fellowes, of Eggesford and Ramsey Abbey, Hunts.
- 18 December 1728: John Russell, of Silverton
- 18 December 1729: Robert Marwood
- 23 December 1730: Roger Melhuish
- 23 December 1731: Sir Thomas Carew, 4th Baronet
- 14 December 1732: Waldo Calmady, of Langdon
- 20 December 1733: Richard Duke, of Otterton.
- 19 December 1734: Nicholas Hooper, of Rawleigh
- 18 December 1735: Samuel Rolle, of Hescott
- 19 January 1737: Richard Stevens, of Moretown
- 12 January 1738: George Buck, of Biddeford
- 15 February 1738: Francis Drew, of Grange
- 21 December 1738: Arthur Tremayne, of Sydenham
- 27 December 1739: John Luscomb, of Combe Royal
- 24 December 1740: Richard Beavis, of Clyst
- 31 December 1741: Robert Lucas, of Bampton
- 2 February 1742: Charles Hayne, of Fuge
- 16 December 1742: John Pollexfen, of Mothecombe
- 2 February 1744: Francis Fulford, of Great Fulford
- 7 February 1745: John Davie, of Orleigh
- 21 February 1746: Thomas Benson, of Northam
- 15 January 1747: John Bassett, of Heanton Court, Heanton Punchardon
- 14 January 1748: Dennis Stuckley, of Bideford
- 11 January 1749: John Rogers, of Plymstock
- 1 February 1749: John Seale, of Mountboon
- 17 January 1750: Dennis Rolle, of Beam
- 6 December 1750: John Woollcombe, of Ashbury
- 14 January 1752: George Fursdon, of Fursdon
- 7 February 1753: Sir John Chichester, 5th Baronet, of Rawleigh
- 31 January 1754: Peter Maddick Docton, of Whitley
- 29 January 1755: Sir John Rogers, 3rd Baronet, of Blachford, near Cornwood
- 27 January 1756: John Oliver Williams, of Exweeke
- 4 February 1757: John Quick ("the 6th"), of Newton St Cyres
- 27 January 1758: Peter Comyns, of Morchard-Bishop
- 2 February 1759: James Modiford Heywood, of Marestow
- 1 February 1760: Arscott Bickford, of Bradford
- 28 January 1761: Sir John Davie, 7th Baronet, of Creedy
- 15 February 1762: Benjamin Incledon, of Pilton
- 4 February 1763: Benedict Marwood Tucker, of Coryton, Kilmington, Devon
- 10 February 1764: William Spicer, of Weare Park, near Exeter
- 1 February 1765: Paul Orchard, of Hartland Abbey
- 26 February 1766: John Jones, of Halden
- 13 February 1767: James Hamlyn, or Hamblyn, of Court
- 15 February 1768: William Ilbert, of West Alvington
- 27 January 1769: Thomas Northmore, of Cleve
- 9 February 1770: Henry Stephens, of Little Torrington
- 6 February 1771: Richard Doidge, of Elford Leigh
- 17 February 1772: Charles Hayne, of Lupton
- 8 February 1773: Thomas Hull, of Marpool Hall
- 7 February 1774: John Lyne, of Lyndridge
- 6 February 1776: John Baring, of Mount Radford, Exeter
- 10 February 1777: George Cross, of Duryard
- 28 January 1778: Humphry Hall, of Manadon
- 1 February 1779: Robert Lydston Newcombe, of Kenton
- 2 February 1780: Thomas Winsloe, of Collepriest
- 5 February 1781: John Burridge Cholwich, of Farringdon
- 1 February 1782: Sir John de la Pole, 6th Baronet, of Shute
- 10 February 1783: Francis Rose Drewe, of Grange
- 9 February 1784: Thomas Lane, of Cosfleet
- 7 February 1785: John Henry Southcote, of Buckland
- 13 February 1786: Alexander Hamilton, of Topsham
- 12 February 1787: John Quick, of Newton St Cyres
- 8 February 1788: Sir John Chichester, 6th Baronet, of Youlston
- 29 April 1789: Montagu Edmund Parker, of Whiteway
- 29 January 1790: Peter Perring, of Halberton
- 4 February 1791: Walter Palk, of Marley House
- 1792: Edward Cotsford, of Winslade House, Clyst St. Mary
- 6 February 1793: William Barber, of Fremington
- 5 February 1794: John Spurrell Pode, of Stoke Damerel
- 11 February 1795: William Clark, of Buckland Tout Saints (died in office)
- 27 February 1795: Phillip Morshead, of Buckland All Saints
- 5 February 1796: Sir Bourchier Wrey, 7th Baronet, of Tawstock
- 1 February 1797: John Seal, of Mount Boon
- 7 February 1798: Arthur Tremaine, of Sydenham
- 1 February 1799: John Burton, of Jacobstowe

=== 1800–1899 ===
- 5 February 1800: Reymundo Putt, of Gittisham
- 11 February 1801: Peter Bluett, of Holcombe Regis
- 25 February 1802: Sir John Davie, 8th Baronet, of Creedy
- 3 February 1803: Stafford Henry Northcote, of Pynes
- 8 February 1804: Thomas Porter, of Rockbear
- 6 February 1805: Samuel Kekewick, of Peamore House
- 1 February 1806: William Jackson, of Cowley
- 4 February 1807: John Bulteel, of Fleet
- 3 February 1808: Sir Henry Carew, 7th Baronet, of Haccombe
- 6 February 1809: Sir Thomas Dyke Acland, 10th Baronet, of Kellerton, near Exeter
- 31 January 1810: Sir Manasseh Masseh Lopes, 1st Baronet, of Maristow House
- 8 February 1811: Arthur Champernowne, of Dartington Hall
- 24 January 1812: James Hay, of Collipriest
- 10 February 1813: Richard Hippisley-Tuckfield, of Fulford
- 4 February 1814: John Newcomb, of Starcross
- 13 February 1815: James Marwood Elton, of Churchstock
- 12 February 1816: Sir Arthur Chichester, 7th Baronet of Youlston House
- 12 February 1817: Sir Walter Roberts, of Courtland
- 24 January 1818: Sir William Templer Pole, 7th Baronet, of Shute
- 10 February 1819: Treby Hele Heys, of Dallamore
- 12 February 1820: Robert Hunt, of Sidbury
- 6 February 1821: Sir John Davie, 9th Baronet, of Creedy
- 4 February 1822: Sir Thomas Trayton Fuller Eliott Drake, of Nutwell Court
- 31 January 1823: Thomas Bewes, of Beaumont House, Plymouth
- 31 January 1824: Benjamin Bowden Dickenson, of Tiverton
- 2 February 1825: George Strode, of Newnham Park
- 30 January 1826: Lewis William Buck, of Daddon, Bideford
- 5 February 1827: Robert William Newman, of Sandridge, near Dartmouth
- 13 February 1828: William Langmead, of Elford Leigh
- 11 February 1829: Sir Humphrey Davie, 10th Baronet, of Creedy
- 2 February 1830: John Beaumont Swete, of Oxton House
- 31 January 1831: Sir Bourchier Palk Wrey, 8th Baronet, of Tawstock
- 6 February 1832: John Morth Woollcombe, of Ashbury
- 1833: John Quicke, of Newton House
- 1834: Edmund Pollexfen Bastard, of Kitley
- 1835: Samuel Trehawke Kekewich, of Peamore
- 1836: Robert Robertson, of Membland
- 1837: William Roope Ilbert, of Horswell
- 1838: Sir John Rogers, 6th Baronet, of Blatchford
- 1839: Codrington Parr, of Stonelands
- 1840: Augustus Stowey, of Kenbury
- 1841: John Crocker Bulteel, of Flete House, was initially appointed, but was replaced by William Arundell Harris Arundell, of Lifton Park
- 1842: Emanuel Lousada, of Peak House
- 1843: William John Clarke, of Buckland
- 1844: Henry Cartwright, of Forde House
- 1845: Edward Simcoe Drewe, of the Grange
- 1846: Sir Walter Carew, 8th Baronet, of Haccombe
- 1847: Henry Champernowne, of Dartington
- 1848: John Sillifant, of Coombe
- 1849: Montagu Edmund Newcombe Parker, of Whiteway
- 1850: William Arundel Yeo, of Fremington
- 1851: Richard Durant, of Sharpham
- 1852: James Cornish, of Black Hall
- 1853: Edmund Bastard Hen Gennys, of Whitleigh Hall
- 1854: Richard Sommers Gard, of Rougemont
- 1855: Thomas Daniel, of Stoodleigh
- 1856: James Samuel Pitman, of Dunchidrock
- 1857: Sir Massey Lopes, 3rd Baronet of Maristow House
- 1858: Edward Marwood-Elton, 1st Baronet, of Widworthy Court
- 1859: John Henry Hippisley, of Shobrook Park
- 1860: Peter Richard Hoare, of Luscombe
- 1861: Sir John Thomas Buller Duckworth, of Weare, Topsham, 2nd Baronet, of Weare, Topsham
- 1862: Maj-Gen. Edward Mortlock Studd, of Oxton House, Kenton
- 1863: Sir George Stucley, 1st Baronet, of Hartland Abbey, Bideford
- 1864: Hon. Mark George Kerr Rolle, of Stevenstone
- 1865: Baldwin John Pollexfen Bastard, of Kitley
- 1866: Sir John Kennaway, 2nd Baronet.
- 1867: John Quicke, of Newton House, Newton St Cyres.
- 1868: Sir Alexander Palmer Bruce Chichester, 2nd Baronet of Arlington Court.
- 1869: John Garratt, of Bishop's Court.
- 1870: John Curzon Moore Stevens, of Winscott.
- 1871: Sir Lydston Newman, 3rd Baronet of Mamhead.
- 1872: John George Johnson, of Cross.
- 1873: John Henry Ley, of Trehill.
- 1874: John Walrond Walrond, of Bradfield, Cullompton.
- 1875: George William Culme Soltau Symons, of Chaddlewood.
- 1876: William Henry Peters, of Harefield.
- 1877: John Fleming, of Bigadon.
- 1878: Shilston Calmady Hamlyn, of Leawood, Bridestowe.
- 1879: Thomas Carew, of Collipriest.
- 1880: Reginald Kelly, of Kelly, Lifton.
- 1881: Charles Arthur Williams Troyte, of Huntsham Court, Bampton.
- 1882: William Halliday Halliday, of Glenthorn, Lynmouth.
- 1883: Thomas Carew Daniel, of Stoodleigh, Tiverton.
- 1884: Octavius Bradshaw, of Barcombe, Paignton.
- 1885: Alexander Kelso Hamilton, of The Retreat, Topsham.
- 1886: Henry Bingham Mildmay, of Flete.
- 1887: John Blyth Coham-Fleming, of Coham, Highampton.
- 1888: Edward Byrom, of Culver House, Exeter.
- 1889: William John Watts, of Forde House, Newton Abbot.
- 1890: Charles Robert Collins, of Strath Culm, Hele
- 1891: Sir Henry Bourchier Toke Wrey, 10th Baronet, of Tawstock Court, Barnstaple
- 1892: Sampson Hanbury, of Bishopstowe, Torquay
- 1893: William Lethbridge, of Wood, South Tawton
- 1894: Arthur Onslow Sillifant, of Coombe, Copplestone
- 1895: Sir John Shelley, 9th Baronet, of Shobrooke Park, Crediton
- 1896: John Pablo Bryce, of Bystock, Exmouth
- 1897: Robert Harvey, of Dundridge, Totnes
- 1898: Sir Charles Daniel Cave, 1st Baronet, of Sidbury Manor House, Sidbury
- 1899: Richard Bowerman West, of Streatham Hall, Exeter

=== 1900–1973 ===
- 1900: John Smyth Smyth-Osbourne, of Ash house, Iddesleigh.
- 1901: Frederick Hamlyn, of Clovelly Court, Bideford.
- 1902: Colonel Edmund Scopoli Walcott, of Rock House, Chudleigh.
- 1903: Sir Charles Thomas Dyke Acland, of Killerton, Bart.
- 1904: Samuel Sanders Stephens, of Stedcombe Manor, Axmouth.
- 1905: Edward Herbert Bayldon, of Oaklands, Dawlish.
- 1906: George Sydney Strode-Strode, of Newnham Park, Plympton.
- 1907: Colonel Sir Dudley Gordon Alan Duckworth-King, 5th Baronet, of Wear House, Countess Wear.
- 1908: Sir Thomas Hewitt, Kt., of The Hoe, Lynton.
- 1909: Richard Maitland Westenra Dawson, of Holne Park, Ashburton.
- 1910: Richard Wallis Cory, of Langdon Court, Wembury, Plymouth.
- 1911: Augustus Langham Christie, of Tapeley Park, Instow.
- 1912: Sir Wilfrid Peek, 3rd Baronet, of Rousdon.
- 1913: Joseph Crawhall Chapman, of Cadewell, Torquay.
- 1914: Sir Henry Yarde Buller Lopes, 4th Baronet, of Maristow House, Roborough.
- 1915: Sir Edward Chaning Wills, 2nd Baronet, of Harcombe, Chudleigh.
- 1916: Sir Ernest Cable, Kt., of Lindridge House, Bishopsteignton.
- 1917: Sir Frederick Arundell de la Pole, 11th Baronet, of Shute House, Kilmington.
- 1918: Henry Aldenburg Bentinck, of Indio, Bovey Tracey.
- 1919: William Pethebridge Martin, of Colleton Manor, Chulmleigh.
- 1920: Sir Alfred Lassam Goodson, of Waddeton Court, Brixham.
- 1921: Edward Clement Atherton Byrom, of Culver, near Exeter.
- 1922: Col. John Edmond Heugh Balfour, of The Manor, Sidmouth.
- 1923: Col. William Edmund Pollexfen Bastard, of Kitley, Yealmpton.
- 1924: Sir Ian Murray Heathcoat-Amory, 2nd Baronet, of Knightshayes Court, Tiverton.
- 1925: Major Rennell Coleridge, of Salston, Ottery St Mary.
- 1926: Sir Charles Cave, 2nd Baronet of Sidbury Manor, Sidmouth
- 1927: Col. George John Ellicombe, of Rocklands, Chudleigh.
- 1928: Capt. Frederic Bouhier Imbert-Terry, of Blue Hayes, Broad Clyst.
- 1929: Lt-Col. Joshua Craven Hoyle, of Onaton Hall, Yealmpton.
- 1930: Major Robert Paul Kitson, of Hazelwood, Hennock, Bovey Tracey.
- 1931: Lt-Col. Thomas Gracey, of Northcote Manor, Burrington, Umberleigh.
- 1932: Samuel Manning Manning-Kidd, of Oxenways, Membury, Axminster.
- 1933: Lt-Col. Francis Marwood Hext, of Redhayes, Pinhoe, Exeter.
- 1934: Lt-Col. Reginald Bastard, of Kitley, Yealmpton.
- 1935: Rev Sir Stanley Daws Dewey, 2nd Baronet, of Peak House, Sidmouth.
- 1936: Sir William Paul Studholme, of Perridge, Nr. Exeter.
- 1937: Lt-Col. Henry Spencer Follett, of Rockbeare Manor.
- 1938: Sir John Frederick Shelley, 10th Baronet., of The Palace, Crediton.
- 1939: Capt. Noel Arthur Godolphin Quicke, of Newton House, Newton St Cyres.
- 1940: Lt-Col. Thomas Lane Ormiston, of Trood House, Alphington.
- 1941: Major Sir Samuel Emile Harvey, of Dundridge, Totnes.
- 1942: Sir John Heathcoat-Amory, 3rd Baronet, of Knightshayes Court, Tiverton.
- 1943: George Colvile Hayter-Hames, of Chagford House, Chagford.
- 1944: Benjamin Garnet Lampard-Vachell, of Weare Giffard Hall, Weare Giffard.
- 1945: Sir Leonard Wilfred Costello, of Red Rock, Topsham.
- 1946: Major Ormsby Allhusen, of Pinhay, Lyme Regis.
- 1947: John Patrick Hepburn, of Scotleigh, Chudleigh.
- 1948: Lt-Col. Sir Henry Bouhier Imbert-Terry, 2nd Baronet of Keeper's Lodge, Strete Raleigh, Whimple.
- 1949: John Adam Day, of Horsford, Middle Warberry Road, Torquay.
- 1950: Major Charles Chichester, of Hall, Bishop's Tawton, near Barnstaple.
- 1951: Captain Sir Edward Charles Benthall, of Lindridge House, Bishopsteignton.
- 1952: Cmdr. Sir Reginald Arthur St. John Leeds, 6th Baronet, of Little Oldway, Paignton.
- 1953: John Arthur Pethebridge Martin, of Colleton House, Chumleigh.
- 1954: Hugh Lassam Goodson, of Waddeton Court, Waddeton near Brixham.
- 1955: Sir Peter William Hoare, of Luscombe Castle, Dawlish.
- 1956: Major Dennis Frederic Bankes Stucley, of Hartland Abbey, Bideford.
- 1957: Cmdr. Walter Raleigh Gilbert, of Compton Castle, Marldon.
- 1958: Brigadier Sir Ralph Herbert Rayner, of Ashcombe Tower near Dawlish.
- 1959: Philip Michael Pethebridge Martin, of Beam, Great Torrington.
- 1960: Lt Cdr. Richard John Bramble Mildmay-White, of Mothecombe, Holbeton, Plymouth.
- 1961: Brigadier Peter Bevil Edward Acland, of Feniton Court, Honiton.
- 1962: Lt-Col. Richard Douglas Davis Birdwood, of Warmington, near Bideford.
- 1963: Philip Debell Tuckett, of Ludbrook, Buckland Monachorum.
- 1964: Col. Joseph Eric Palmer, of Rosemoor, Great Torrington.
- 1965: Col. Charles Richard Spencer, of Elfordtown, Yelverton.
- 1966: Brigadier Eric Llewellyn Griffith Griffith-Williams, of Rockbeare Manor.
- 1967: Col. Michael Picton Ansell, of Pillhead House, Bideford.
- 1968: Major General Victor David Graham Campbell, of Beggar's Bush, South Brent.
- 1969: Sir Charles Edward Coleridge Cave, of Sidbury Manor, Sidmouth.
- 1970: Lt-Col. Godfrey Sturdy Incledon-Webber, of St Brannocks, Braunton. 1904–86.
- 1971: James Hubert Cornish-Bowden, of Black Hall, Avonwick, South Brent.
- 1972: Vice Admiral Sir Peveril Barton Reiby Wallop William-Powlett, of Cadhay, Ottery St Mary.
- 1973: Lieut.-Colonel Trenchard John Pine-Coffin, of West Dydon, Fairy Cross, Bideford.

== High Sheriffs of Devon ==
=== 1974–1999 ===
- 1974: George Ernest Hillyer Creber, of 2 Standerton House, Seymour Road, Mannamead, Plymouth.
- 1975: Field Marshal Sir Richard (Amyatt) Hull, of Pinhoe, Exeter.
- 1976: Lieut.-Commander John Arundell Holdsworth, of Ogwell, Newton Abbot.
- 1977: Michael Holland-Hibbert, of Broadclyst House, Exeter.
- 1978: Percy Basil Browne, of Torr House, Westleigh, Bideford.
- 1979: Stanley Edgcumbe, of Turret Willows, Ridgeway, Plympton.
- 1980: Captain William Grenville Peek, of Hazelwood, Loddiswell, Kingsbridge.
- 1981: Arthur David George Llewellyn, of Stuckeridge House, Oakford, Tiverton.
- 1982: Richard Michael Huxtable, of Deer Park, Barnstaple.
- 1983: Charles James Woodrow, of Breton House, Vauxhall Quay, The Barbican, Plymouth.
- 1984: Alfred Michael Sutton-Scott-Tucker, of Riversbridge, Dartmouth.
- 1985: Michael Fitzgerald Heathcoat-Amory, of Chevithorne Barton, Tiverton.
- 1986: Captain Timothy Carleton Keigwin, of the Old Vicarage, West Anstey, South Molton.
- 1987: John Rosewarne Trahair, of West Park, Ivybridge.
- 1988: Captain Sir Paul Henry William Studholme, 2nd Baronet, of Perridge House, Longdown, Exeter.
- 1989: Oliver Newton Wallop William-Powlett, of Cadhay, Ottery St Mary.
- 1990: Geoffrey Edward Ford North, of Holmingham Farm, Bampton, Tiverton.
- 1991: Arnold Lewis Sayers, of Carswell, Holbeton, near Plymouth.
- 1992: Elizabeth Anne Eden, of Culver, Longdown, near Exeter.
- 1993: Sir John Dennis Boles, of Rydon House, Talaton, near Exeter.
- 1994: Countess of Arran, of Castle Hill, Filleigh, Barnstaple.
- 1995: James Humphrey George Woollcombe, of Hemerdon House, Plympton, near Plymouth.
- 1996: Julia Mary Victoria Tremlett, of Bickham House, Kenn, near Exeter.
- 1997: Noel Frederic Augustus Page-Turner, of Woodhayes, Honiton.
- 1998: Lady Clinton, of Heanton Satchville, Huish, near Torrington.
- 1999: Sir Simon James Day, of Keaton House, Ermington, Ivybridge.

=== 2000–present ===
- 2000: Major Ranulf Courtauld Rayner, of Ashcombe Tower, near Dawlish.
- 2001: Lieutenant Colonel Anthony John Mervyn Drake, of Musbury Barton, Axminster.
- 2002: Major General Nicholas George Picton Ansell, of Pillhead House, Old Barnstaple Road, Bideford.
- 2003: Philip Debell Tuckett, of Leigh Barton, Milton Abbot, Tavistock.
- 2004: Countess of Devon, of Powderham Castle, Exeter.
- 2005: Sir John Cave, 5th Baronet, of Sidbury Manor, Sidmouth.
- 2006: Sir Hugh Stucley, 6th Baronet of East Worlington, Crediton
- 2007: Anthony John Bramble Mildmay-White of Holbeton, Plymouth
- 2008: Lady Clifford of Chudleigh of Ugbrooke House, Chudleigh (wife of Thomas Clifford, 14th Baron Clifford of Chudleigh)
- 2009: (Edward) David Fursdon of Cadbury
- 2010: Elizabeth d'Erlanger of Tiverton
- 2011: Sarah Violet Lopes of Plymouth
- 2012: Robin Patrick Barlow of Newton Abbot
- 2013: John Albert Thomas Lee of Coombe Barton
- 2014: John Rous of Clovelly Court, Bideford
- 2015: Admiral Sir James Michael Burnell-Nugent of Sheepham Mill, Modbury
- 2016: Angela Mary Gilbert of Compton Castle, Compton, Marldon, Paignton
- 2017: Heleen Vanda Mary Wilson Lindsay-Fynn of Budleigh Salterton
- 2018: Grania Tiffany Phillips of Colleton Manor, Chulmleigh
- 2019: Captain Simon Charles Martin of Brentor, near Tavistock
- 2020: Gerald William Vaughan Hine-Haycock of Totnes
- 2021: Lady Studholme of Longdown
- 2022: Richard David Youngman of Crediton
- 2023: Reverend Nicholas Howard Paul McKinnel of Newton Abbot
- 2024: Commodore John Keith Moores of Dartmouth
- 2025: Caroline Anne Harlow of Exeter
- 2026: Mark Picton Ansell of Bideford

== Bibliography ==
- Hughes, A. (1898). List of Sheriffs for England and Wales from the Earliest Times to A.D. 1831. London: Eyre & Spottiswoode. (with amendments of 1963, Public Record Office)
