= Charles Cave =

Charles Cave may refer to:

- Sir Charles Cave, 1st Baronet (1832–1922), British banker
- Sir Charles Cave, 2nd Baronet (1861–1932)
- Sir Charles Cave, 4th Baronet (1927–1997)
- Charles John Philip Cave (1871–1950), English meteorologist
- Charles S. Cave (c. 1825–1907), American politician, postmaster, and businessman
- Charles Cave, bassist of the British band White Lies

== See also ==
- Charles Philip Haddon-Cave (1925–1999), Australian-born British colonial administrator in Hong Kong
- Cave (name)
