= Cave baronets of Cleve Hill (1896) =

Escutcheon of the Cave baronets

The Cave baronetcy, of Cleve Hill, in the parish of Mangotsfield, in the County of Gloucester, of Sidbury Manor, in the parish of Sidbury, in the County of Devon, and of Stoneleigh House, in the parish of Clifton, in the City and County of Bristol, was created in the Baronetage of the United Kingdom on 21 July 1896 for the banker Charles Cave.

== Cave baronets, of Cleve Hill, Sidbury Manor and Stoneleigh House (1896) ==
- Sir Charles Daniel Cave, 1st Baronet (1832–1922)
- Sir Charles Henry Cave, 2nd Baronet JP (17 March 1861 – 26 July 1932), was High Sheriff of Devon in 1926.
- Sir Edward Charles Cave, 3rd Baronet (1893–1946)
- Sir Charles Edward Coleridge Cave, 4th Baronet JP DL FRICS (28 February 1927 – 1 November 1997), was High Sheriff of Devon in 1969.
- Sir John Charles Cave, 5th Baronet (1958–2018), High Sheriff of Devon in 2005.
- Sir George Charles Cave, 6th Baronet (born 1987)

The heir presumptive is the current holder's younger brother, William Alexander Cave (born 1992).

== Extended family ==
- The 1st Baronet's great-grandfather John Cave (1736–1800) was the founder of the Cave bank of Bristol, trading as Ames, Cave, Harford, Daubeny & Bright.
- The 1st Baronet's brother Stephen Cave was Member of Parliament of New Shoreham from 1859.

== Notes ==
Baronetage of the United Kingdom
Preceded by Seely baronets	Cave baronets of Cleve Hill, Sidbury Manor and Stoneleigh House; 21 July 1896	Succeeded by Dalgleish baronets
