= Kingston, Staverton =

Historic estate in Devon, England

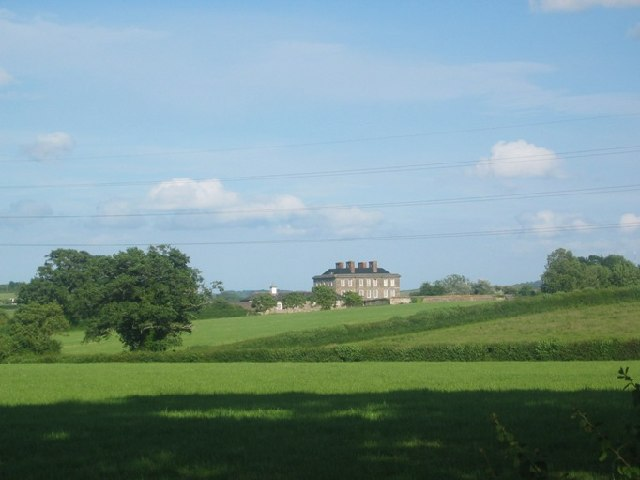
Kingston House, viewed in 2005

Kingston is a historic estate in the parish of Staverton in Devon, England. The surviving large mansion house, known as Kingston House (near the village of Broadhempston), is a grade II* listed building, rebuilt in 1743 by John Rowe, after a fire had destroyed the previous structure. The Kingston Aisle or Kingston Chapel survives in the parish church of Staverton (dedicated to St Paul de Leon), built by and for the use of the successive owners of the Kingston estate.

== Descent ==
=== (Hext) ===
The family of Hext resided at a place named "Kingston", which although Pole (d.1635) suggests (almost as a post scriptum) is Kingston in the parish of Staverton ("At Kingston their also dwelled Thomas Hext in King Edw 4 tyme"), cannot be reconciled with the well documented contemporaneous tenure of Kingston, Staverton, by the Barnhous family, whose heiress is known to have married John Rowe of Totnes. There is however a parish and village named Kingston in South Devon, about 14 miles south-west of Kingston, Staverton, and Thomas Hext "of Kingston", the first member of the family recorded in the Heraldic Visitations of Devon, married a member of the Fortescue family of Whympston, Modbury, about 2 1/2 miles north-west of the village of Kingston.

=== Barnhouse ===
Kingston was a seat of the Barnhous (alias Bernhous, Barnhous, etc.) family, first noted by Pole, and began with William Bernhous, who resided there during the reigns of the Kings named Edward I (1272-1307) and Edward II (1307-1327). He was followed by John I, John II, John III and John IV, who married a daughter of Richard Chichester (1423–1496), lord of the manor of Raleigh in the parish of Pilton, Devon, Sheriff of Devon in 1469 and 1475.

=== Rowe ===
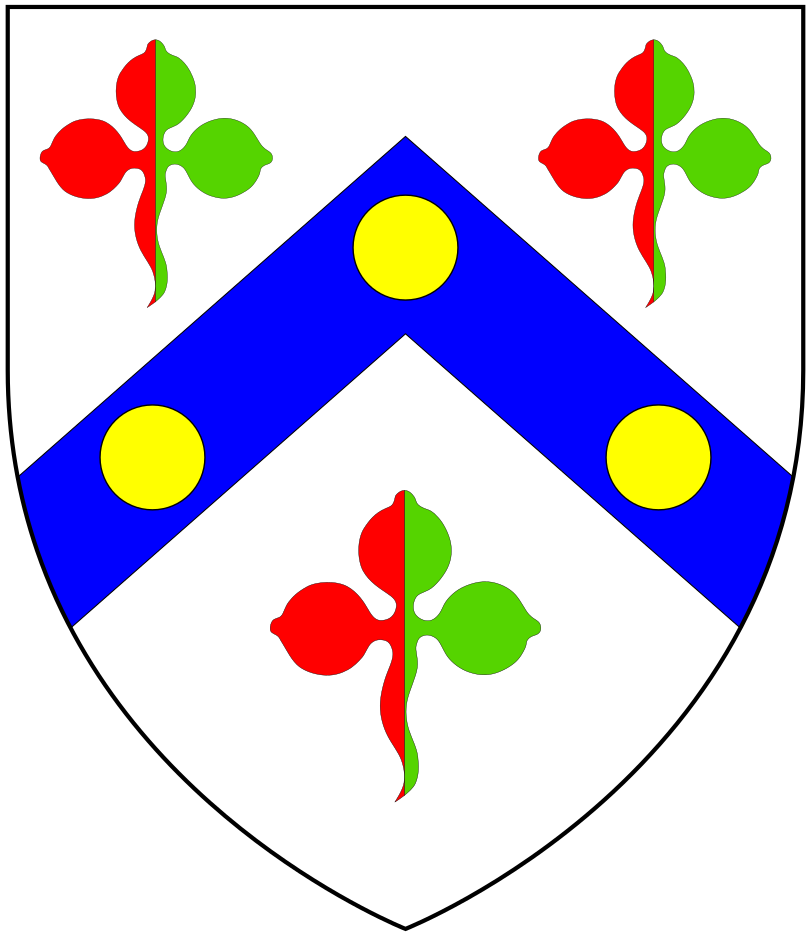
Arms of Rowe of Kingston: Argent, on a chevron azure between three trefoils slipped per pale gules and vert three bezants. A different version of these arms is today quartered by Hill, Marquess of Downshire

The Rowe family was seated at Kingston for several generations.

==== John I Rowe (d. 1544) ====
John Rowe (d. 1544) of Totnes (2 miles south of Kingston), a serjeant-at-law, married Agnes Barnhouse, a daughter and co-heiress of William Barnhouse of Kingston, and thus the estate descended to the Rowe family.

==== John II Rowe (1509-1592) ====
John Rowe (1509-1592), son and heir, whose monumental brass survives at Staverton Church, is positioned unusually on an exterior wall. He married twice, firstly to Philippa Blewett, a daughter of Richard Bluett (lord of the manor of Holcombe Rogus, Devon, and of Cothay (which he rebuilt) in Kittisford, Somerset, whose monumental brass exists in Kittisford Church) by his wife Mary Grenville, a daughter of Sir Thomas Grenville (d.1513) lord of the manor of Bideford in Devon and Stowe in the parish of Kilkhampton in Cornwall. Secondly, he married Mary Chichester, a daughter of John Chichester (1472-1537/8), lord of the manor of Raleigh, Devon. Devon.

==== John III Rowe (1544-1625/6) ====
John Rowe (1544-1625/6), son and heir of his father's second wife, Mary Chichester. He married Prudence Cary, 3rd daughter of Robert Cary (died 1586), lord of the Manor of Clovelly, Devon, a Member of Parliament for Barnstaple, Devon, in October 1553 and Sheriff of Devon in 1555–56.

==== George Rowe (1580-1644/5) ====
George Rowe (1580-1644/5), son and heir, who married Dorothy Horde (d.1655), a daughter of Alan Horde of Hordes Park, in the parish of Astley Abbotts near Bridgnorth, Shropshire, whose family had supplied several Members of Parliament for Bridgnorth. Her monument survives in Staverton Church.

==== John IV Rowe (1614/15-1688) ====
John Rowe (1614/15-1688), son and heir, was seated during his father's lifetime at Will, in the parish of Staverton. He was Sheriff of Devon in 1686. In 1661, he married his neighbour Juliana Gould (1636-1696), eldest daughter of Edward Gould (1610-1661) of Coombe in the parish of Staverton. Her brother was Edward Gould (1637-1675), who married Margaret Dunning, a great-aunt of John Dunning, 1st Baron Ashburton (1731-1783).

==== John V Rowe (d.1707) ====
John Rowe (d.1707), son and heir, who in 1697 married his 4th cousin Ursula Chichester (d.1711), a daughter of John Chichester (1633-1699) of Arlington in Devon.

==== John VI Rowe (fl.1743) ====
John Rowe (born 1704), 3rd but eldest surviving son and heir, who rebuilt Kingston House in 1743, after a fire had destroyed the previous building. He was described as a Papist by the Devon historian Polwhele (d.1838), who described his new house as:

"A spacious four-front, modern-built house, its materials consist of hewn marble stone cemented with lime and sand, with an elegant cornice of hewn marble stone all around. It is three stories high besides the attic storey with large arched vaults underneath, and adjoining to it is a large walled alcove garden, etc. with a lawn and avenue in it".

The new house contained a Roman Catholic chapel, which room survives as the first floor east room, with a plasterwork overmantel showing the Flight into Egypt in a pedimented frame decorated with putti, with busts supposedly representing Saints Peter and Paul. John Rowe became a bankrupt at some time before 1784, by which date the estate had been purchased by Thomas Bradbridge.

=== Bradbridge ===
==== Thomas Bradbridge (d.1815) ====
In 1787, Thomas Bradbridge (d.1815) purchased the estate from the Exeter Bank (which had foreclosed on the previous mortgagee) for £5,500, but it was sold two years after his death. He is memorialised in Staverton Church by his surviving neo-classical monument with an urn. By his will dated 14 September 1805 he founded Bradbridge's Gift, a charitable bequest which directed that immediately after his decease, such sum of money should be invested in the three per cent consols, in the names of his trustees, as would produce, yearly, a sum not less than 32 shillings, to be applied at the discretion of his trustees, during their lives, and afterwards by the major part of the churchwardens and overseers of the poor of Staverton, for the time being, the proprietor of Kingston held the authority to decide any issue on which opinions were evenly split, for the purpose of educating poor children in the parish of Staverton in reading; and he also directed that a tablet, with a proper inscription, to specify his donation, might be engraved on marble, and erected in the Kingston aisle of Staverton church; and when all but one of his trustees should be dead, he directed that the stock so to be purchased should be transferred into the names of two respectable inhabitants of Staverton, jointly with him and to be named by him, and so from time to time for ever; By a codicil to his will, dated 9 April 1815, he increased the sum to be invested in the funds to such sum as would produce an annual income of 40 shillings. The stock arising from this gift is £66 13 shillings 4 pence of three per cent consols, standing in the name of Henry Studdy, esq. and two other trustees, the dividends are received at the bank of Messrs. Beutall, and paid over to Mr. Thomas May, one of the present churchwardens of Staverton, who, as none of the trustees reside in the parish, acts for them, and pays the same for the teaching of five poor children at the schools in the parish, at the rate of 8s. Per annum for each child. A tablet, containing a statement of this gift, was duly erected in Staverton church.

=== Rendell ===
In 1816, Kingston was acquired by the Rendell family, which lived there for 120 years. In 1937 it was the home of William Rendell, a bachelor, and his two unmarried sisters. After William's death, his sisters sold the estate.

=== Corfield ===
In 1985, Michael Corfield, a proprietor of a building materials supply group, with his wife Elizabeth, purchased the house in a dilapidated state and 10 acres of grounds for £150,000. They carried out significant repairs (unblocking 33 windows, removing a staircase and repairing original ceiling roses and cornices, reinstating sweeping steps up to the front door) and let out cottages, outbuildings and bed and breakfast bedrooms in the house. They were featured in an episode of the TV show The Hotel Inspector broadcast in August 2010. In February 2011, they offered the house and 10 acres for sale at an asking price of £3 million
