= Sir Charles Cave, 1st Baronet =

British baronet and banker

Sir Charles Daniel Cave, 1st Baronet, DL, JP (17 September 1832 – 29 October 1922) was a British baronet and banker.

== Background ==
Cave was the third son of Daniel Cave and his wife Frances, daughter of Henry Locock. His older brother was the lawyer, writer and politician Stephen Cave. He was educated at Exeter College, Oxford, where he graduated with a Bachelor of Arts in 1855 and a Master of Arts two years later. Cave was also the great nephew of Thomas Daniel of Bristol through his grandmother Anne Cave nee Daniel (1763–1851) who was Thomas's older sister by one year.

== Career ==
Cave was appointed High Sheriff of Bristol in 1863 and High Sheriff of Devon in 1898. He served as Justice of the Peace for Devonshire and Gloucestershire representing both counties also as Deputy Lieutenant. Cave was first director of the Union Bank of London and after a merger of the Union of London and Smith's Bank Ltd. On 21 July 1896, he was created a baronet, of Cleve Hill, in the parish of Mangotsfield, in the County of Gloucester, of Sidbury Manor, in the parish of Sidbury, in the County of Devon, and of Stoneleigh House, in the parish of Clifton, in the City and County of Bristol.

== Family ==
On 1 September 1859, he married Edith Harriet Symonds, daughter of John Addington Symonds and had by her five children, one daughter and four sons. She died in 1912. Cave survived her until 1922 and was buried in Brompton Cemetery, London. His oldest having predeceased him in 1901, Cave was succeeded in the baronetcy by his second son Charles. He was the grandson of Stephen Cave the slave owner.

Baronetage of the United Kingdom
New creation	Baronet (of Cleve Hill, Sidbury Manor and Stoneleigh House); 1896 – 1922	Succeeded by Charles Cave
