= Richard Chichester =

Richard Chichester may refer to:

- Richard Henry Lee Chichester (1870–1930), American judge from Virginia
- Richard Chichester (died 1496) (1423–1496), Sheriff of Devon

== See also ==
- Richard of Chichester (1197–1253), Bishop of Chichester
