= Richard Coffin =

Richard Coffin may refer to:

- Richard Coffin (1456–1523), Sheriff of Devon
- Richard Coffin (1623–1700), Sheriff of Devon
- Richard Coffin (1684–1766), British politician, MP for Barnstaple

== See also ==
- Richard Pine-Coffin (1908–1974), British army officer
