= Richard Champernowne (died 1419) =

Sheriff of Devon

Sir Richard Champernowne (1344-1419) was an English landowner and administrator who held lands at Modbury, Dodbrooke, Bridford, and East Portlemouth in Devon and at Aston Rowant in Oxfordshire.

== Origins ==
Born on 29 June 1344 at the manor of Suddon in the parish of Wincanton and baptised in the parish church of Wincanton, he was the son of Sir Thomas Champernowne, a member of the Champernowne family who had been landowners in Devon for many generations, and his wife Eleanor Rohant, daughter and heiress of Sir Roger Rohant. His sister Cecily Champernowne married Simon Fleming.

== Career ==
In his public life, he served as Sheriff of Devon in 1368, in 1381, and again in 1387. In 1386 was appointed by Thomas Brantingham, the Bishop of Exeter, to demarcate the disputed border between Devon and Cornwall. In his private life, he and his second wife obtained in 1404 permission from the Pope to have a portable altar and to choose their own confessor. He made his will on 26 February 1419, asking to be buried beside his second wife at Dodbrooke, and it was proved at Exeter on 3 April 1419.

== Family ==
About 25 April 1369, when he was 25 years old, he married Alice Astley, daughter of Thomas Astley, 3rd Baron Astley, and his wife Elizabeth Beauchamp. Their children included:

Alexander Champernowne (died 1441), who before November 1384 married Joan Ferrers, daughter of Martin Ferrers.
Joan Champernowne (died 1419), who married first Sir James Chudleigh (died 1402), of Ashton, and secondly Sir John Courtenay (died 1406), of Powderham.

After Alice died, by 13 August 1394 he had married Catherine Daubeney, daughter of Sir Giles Daubeney and his wife Eleanor Willington, and their children included:

Richard Champernowne (died 1418), later knighted, who married Isabel Bonville, daughter of Sir John Bonville and his wife Elizabeth FitzRoger.
Margaret Champernowne (died 1434), who married Robert Hill, of Shilstone, son of Sir Robert Hill.
John Champernowne, who married Margaret Spriggy, daughter of John Spriggy.
