= William Dalgleish =

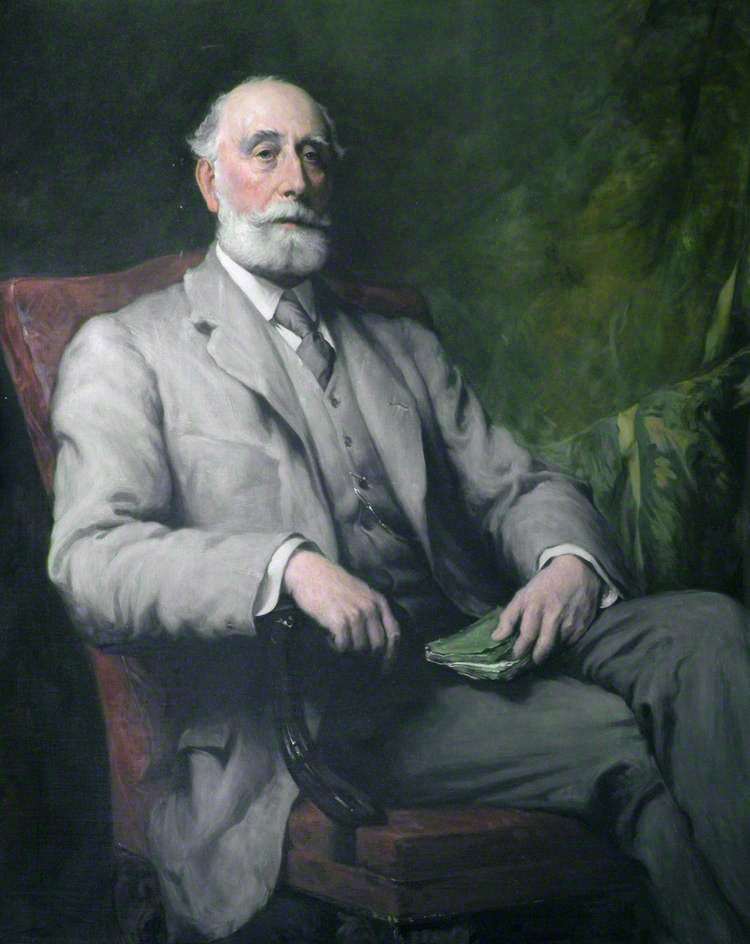
Walter William Ouless, William Ogilvy Dalgleish, 1911.

Sir William Ogilvy Dalgleish, 1st Baronet (17 June 1832 – 21 December 1913), was a Scottish businessman and benefactor.

Dalgleish was Chairman of Baxter Brothers & Co., Dundee. He was the principal benefactor of the medical school of University College, Dundee. He unsuccessfully contested Dundee as a Conservative in the 1892 general election. He was created a baronet, of Errol Park in the parish of Errol and County of Perth, of Mayfield in the parish of Dundee and county of Forfar, of Woodburne and Baltilly in the parish of Ceres and County of Fife, and of Coulin, in the parish of Lochcarron and County of Ross, on 22 July 1896. In July 1902, he received the freedom of the city of Dundee.

Dalgleish died in December 1913, aged 81, when the baronetcy became extinct.

Baronetage of the United Kingdom
New creation	Baronet (of Erroll Park, Mayfield, Woodburne, Baltilly and Coulin); 1896–1913	Extinct
Preceded by Cave baronets	Dalgleish baronets of Erroll Park, Mayfield, Woodburne, Baltilly and Coulin; 22 July 1896	Succeeded by McIver baronets
