= Sidbury Castle =

Iron Age hill fort in Devon, England

Coordinates: 50°42′54″N 3°14′07″W

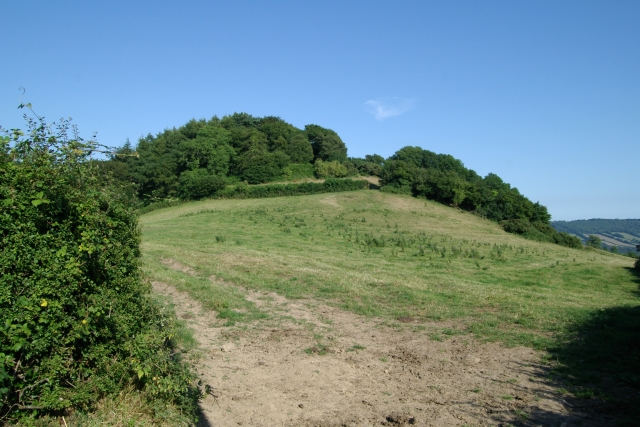
Hill of Sidbury Castle.

Sidbury Castle is a substantial Iron Age hill fort near Sidbury in Devon, England. It occupies a large hilltop overlooking the town and the River Sid at approximately 185 metres (607 ft) above sea level.
