= Sidbury, Eastern Cape =

- Location within Eastern Cape Location within South Africa
- Coordinates: 33°25′18″S 26°10′22″E
- Country: South Africa
- Province: Eastern Cape
- Municipality: Makana

Area
  - Total: 7.91 km^{2} (3.05 sq mi)
- Elevation: 470 m (1,540 ft)

Population (2011)
  - Total: 115
  - Density: 14.5/km^{2} (37.7/sq mi)

Racial makeup (2011)
  - Black African: 83.5%
  - Coloured: 4.3%
  - Indian/Asian: 4.3%
  - White: 7.8%

First languages (2011)
  - Xhosa: 66.7%
  - English: 20.0%
  - Other: 13.3%
- Time zone: UTC+2 (SAST)

Sidbury is a village in the Albany district of the Eastern Cape province of South Africa.

== History ==
The village was founded by Lieutenant Richard Daniell, R.N. He was leader of the Daniell party of the British 1820 Settlers to the Eastern Cape which came to South Africa on the ship the Duke of Marlborough . He named the village after his home town of Sidbury, Devonshire.

He provided land and funds for the building of a church in the village, the church (named St Peter's after the church in Sidbury, Devonshire) was built in 1841 and was one of the first ten Anglican churches in South Africa. The church predates the establishment of the Diocese of Cape Town. The church is a heritage site recognised by the South African Heritage Resource Agency.

In the 1890s, the community of Sidbury started a cricket club which continues to the present despite its small population.

== Notable people ==
Frances Charlotte Slater who went by the pen name Francis Bancroft wrote 17 novels including works such as The Veldt Dwellers (1912) and Thane Brandon (1913).

== See also ==
- Diocese of Grahamstown
- Kwantu Private Game Reserve

== Notes and references ==
- Eve, Jeanette (2003). A Literary Guide to the Eastern Cape: Places and the Voices of Writers. Juta and Company. ISBN 978-1-919930-15-2.
- Martin, Desmond (2005). The Bishop's Churches. Struik. ISBN 978-1-77007-155-1.
- Mitford-Barberton, Ivan; White, Violet (1969). Some frontier families: biographical sketches of 100 Eastern Province families before 1840. Human and Rousseau.
