= Richard Chichester (died 1496) =

Arms of Chichester: Chequy or and gules, a chief vair

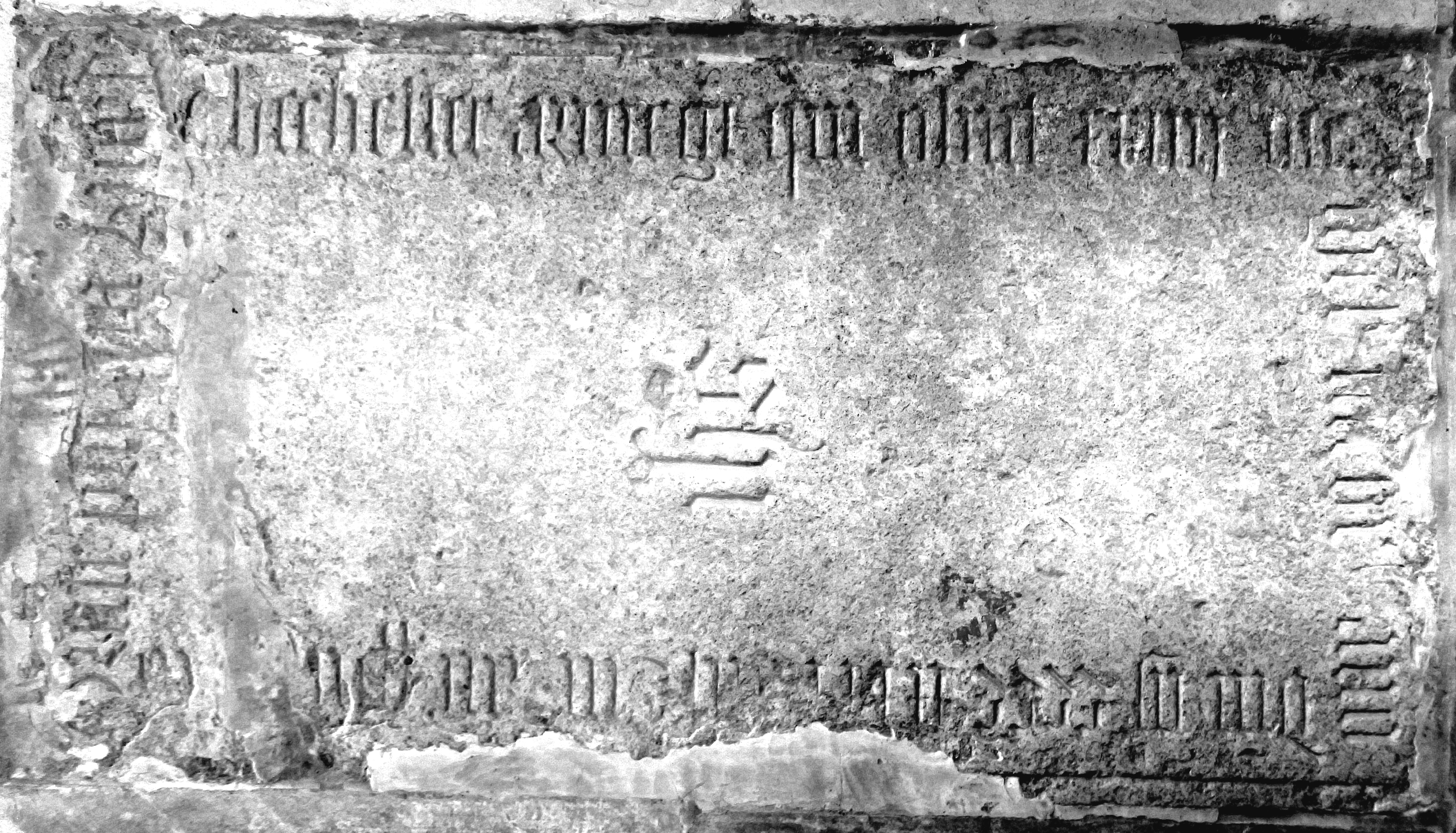
Ledger stone of Richard Chichester (d.1496), of Raleigh, Sheriff of Devon 1469 & 1475, floor of chancel aisle, Pilton Church, Devon. Text: Orate p(ro) anima Ricardi Chichester Armig(er)i qui obiit XXIIII die Octobri an(n)o D(o)m(ini) M(illensim)o CCCCLXXXXVIII (or CCCCLXXXXVI) cuius ani(mae) p(ros)picietur D(eus). ("Pray for the soul of Richard Chichester, Esquire, who died on the 24th day of October (Month much worn, December, per Vivian, Heralds' Visitations of Devon, p.172) in the year of Our Lord the one thousandth four hundredth and ninety eighth (sixth?) of whose soul may God look on with favour"). In the centre the letters "IHS" (J(E)H(ESU)S). It is of the same stone and in the same style with identical lettering to the slab of John Courtenay (d.1510) in Molland Church, Devon.

Richard Chichester (1423-1496), lord of the manor of Raleigh in the parish of Pilton, near Barnstaple, North Devon, was twice Sheriff of Devon, in 1469 and 1475.

== Origins ==
He was the son and heir of Sir John Chichester (1385-1437) of Raleigh (who fought in the Battle of Agincourt (1415) in the retinue of the Sieur de Harrington) by his wife Alice Wotton, daughter and co-heiress of John Wotton, lord of the manor of Widworthy, Devon. Sir John was the son and heir of John Chichester (fl.1365) (lord of the manors of Treverbin in Cornwall and of Beggerskewish and Donwer in Somerset.) by his wife Thomasine de Raleigh (d.1402), daughter and heiress of Sir John De Raleigh of Raleigh.

== Career ==
He was a minor aged 14 on his father's death and entered wardship to a person unknown. He served as Sheriff of Devon in 1469 and 1475.

== Marriages and children ==
He married twice:

- Firstly to Margaret Keynes, a daughter of Nicholas Keynes, lord of the manor of Winkleigh, Devon, by whom he had three sons and two (or three) daughters, including:
  - John Chichester (d.1477), eldest son and heir apparent, who married Thomasine Steyning, a daughter of William Steyning, but died childless and predeceased his father.
  - Nicholas Chichester (c.1447 – before 1496), 2nd son, who also predeceased his father, having married Christine Paulet (widow of Henry Hull of Larkbear), the third daughter of Sir Nicholas Pawlet of Sampford Peverell in Devon, who survived him and remarried twice. By his wife Nicholas had children including:
    - John Chichester (1472-1537/8) of Raleigh, heir to his grandfather, who by his marriage to the great heiress Margaret Beaumont, inherited substantial lands in Devon, including the manor of Shirwell, in which was Youlston, the former Beaumont seat, for which the Chichester family eventually abandoned Raleigh.
  - Richard Chichester, 3rd son, who married Thomasine de Hall (died 1502), the heiress of Hall, in the parish of Bishops Tawton, and founded that line of the family, whose descendants (in a female line) still own the estate today.
  - Margaret Chichester, wife of John Hensley,
  - Elizabeth Chichester, the first wife of John Berry of Ilfracombe, Devon, whose son founded the family of Berry of East Leigh, Bideford.
  - Daughter (name unknown), who married John IV Barnhous of Kingston, Staverton in Devon.
- Secondly he married Elizabeth Sapcott (d.1502), a daughter of Sir John Sapcott, who survived her husband. Without children.

== Death ==
He died on 25 December 1496 and his Inquisition post mortem was taken in 1498. His ledger stone survives set into the floor of the chancel aisle of Pilton Church. His heir was his grandson John Chichester (1472-1537/8), eldest son and heir apparent of Nicholas Chichester.

== Sources ==
- Vivian, Lt.Col. J.L., (Ed.) The Visitations of the County of Devon: Comprising the Heralds' Visitations of 1531, 1564 & 1620, Exeter, 1895, pp. 172–184, pedigree of Chichester

Political offices
Preceded by Philip Beaumont	High Sheriff of Devon; 1468–1469	Succeeded by Nicholas Carew
Preceded by Richard Pomeroy	High Sheriff of Devon; 1474–1475	Succeeded by Otes Gilbert
