= Richard Coffin (1623–1700) =

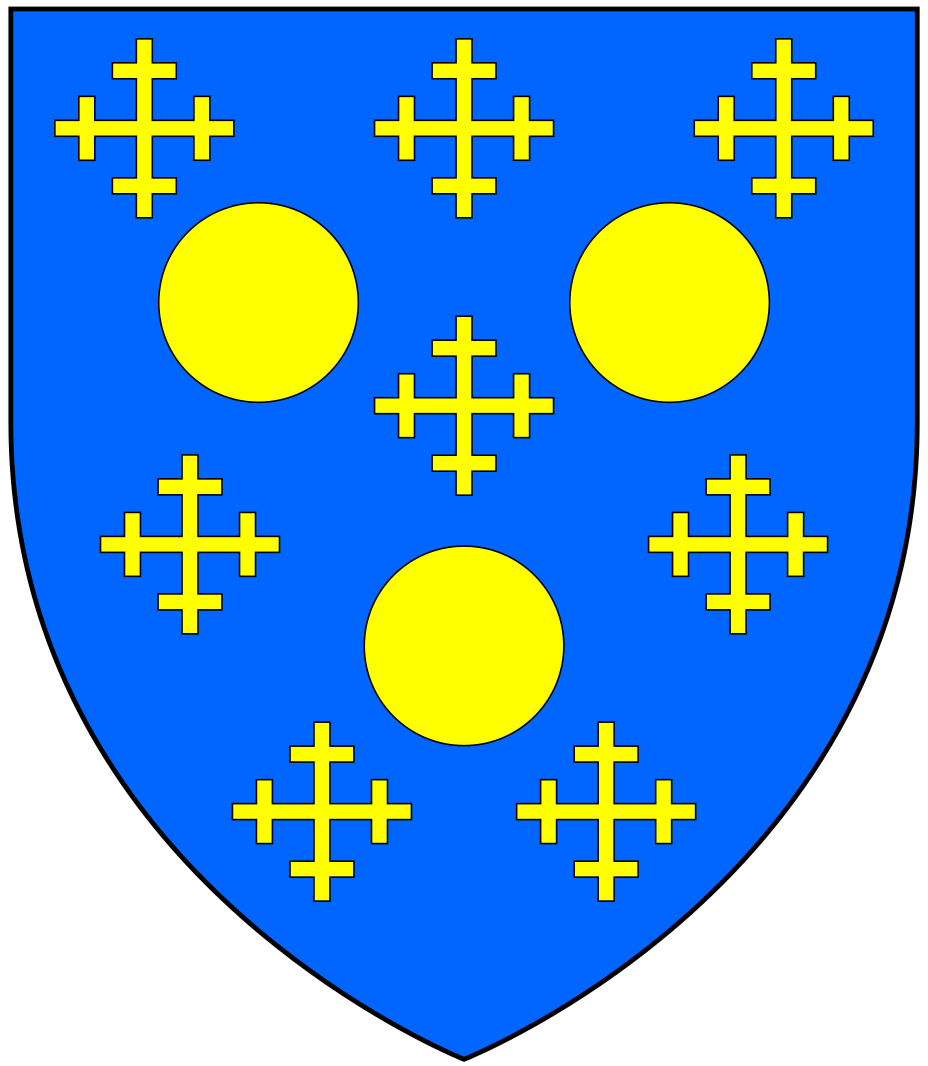
Arms of Coffin

Richard Coffin (1623–1700) of Portledge in the parish of Alwington in North Devon, was lord of the manor of Alwington and served as Sheriff of Devon in 1683.

He was the only son and heir of John Coffin (1593–1622) of Portledge by his wife Elizabeth Hurding, one of the two eldest daughters of Henry Hurding (died 1627) (alias Harding) of Long Bredy, Dorset. The Coffin family had been established at Alwington since the reign of King Henry II (1154–1189), and remained there in unbroken male succession until 1766.

He married three times:

- Firstly in 1644 to Mary Dennis of the family of Dennis of Orleigh, North Devon, near Alwington, without children.
- Secondly in 1648 to Dorothy Rowe (died 1666), by whom he had two sons and nine daughters.
- Thirdly in 1674 he married Anne Prideaux (died 1705), a daughter of Edmund Prideaux (1606–1683), of Padstow, Cornwall, by whom he had a further two sons and two daughters

== Sources ==
- Vivian, Lt.Col. J.L., (Ed.) The Visitations of the County of Devon: Comprising the Heralds' Visitations of 1531, 1564 & 1620. Exeter, 1895.
