= Cave baronets =

Set index for Cave baronets

There have been two baronetcies created for persons with the surname Cave, one in the Baronetage of England and one in the Baronetage of the United Kingdom. As of 2026 both creations are extant as of 2008.

- Cave, later Cave-Browne-Cave baronets, of Stanford (1641): see Cave-Browne-Cave baronets
- Cave baronets of Cleve Hill, Sidbury Manor and Stoneleigh House (1896)
