= Sidbury Manor =

Coordinates: 50°43′37″N 3°13′45″W

General information
- Type: Country House
- Classification: Grade II listed building
- Location: Sidbury
- Town or city: Sidmouth
- Completed: 1879

Height
- Roof: Slate

Technical details
- Material: Redbrick
- Floor count: 2

Design and construction
- Architect(s): David Brandon

Sidbury Manor is a privately owned 19th-century country mansion situated at Sidbury, Sidmouth, East Devon. It is a Grade II listed building. Built in 1879, the country house is a red brick building with a slate roof, including two towers, one square and the other octagonal. It is owned by the Cave baronets.

== House ==
The original house at Sidbury was built in 1633, and was owned by the Guppy family. When the house burned down in the middle of the 19th century, the estate was sold to Cave family, who still own the house today. The present house was built in 1879, designed by David Brandon. It is a 2-story redbrick country house, cornered with hamstone quoins. The roof is slate, with Jacobean chimneys. The entrance is on the eastern aspect of the building, which also includes an octagonal tower. The tower has gargoyles in the shapes of dogs and griffins, as well as a lead roof topped by a weather vane. The entrance has a stone gable topped with a lion and finial. There is a 2 bay arcade with diamond block piers and 4 arches, which is then repeated in the conservatory which has a stone faced front. The conservatory's roof is supported by cast iron columns. The house has a second square tower with a French roof, and second weathervane. The house was designated Grade II listed status on 12 November 1973.

David Cave of Cleve Hill, Gloucestershire, acquired land in and about fashionable Sidmouth in the mid-1800s. His son Rt Hon Stephen Cave was Member of Parliament for New Shoreham 1859 -1880 and was twice Postmaster General. Cave who died in 1880 never lived there but bequeathed the house and the estate of some 3800 acres to his younger brother Charles who in 1896 was created the first of the Cave baronets.
