= Sidbury =

Village in Devon, England

Coordinates: 50.71981°N 3.2207°W

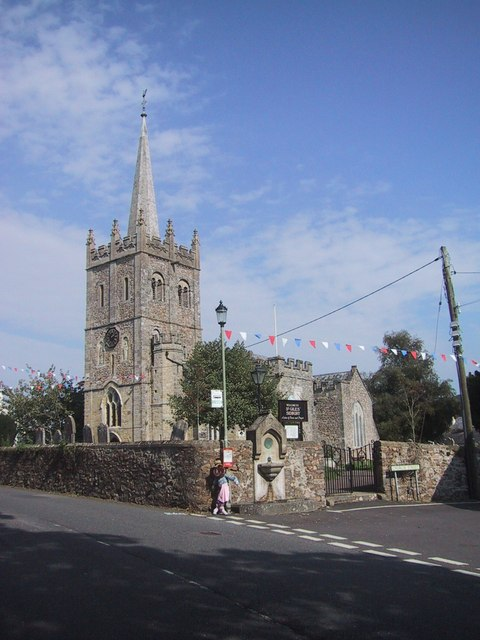
- St Giles's church, Sidbury

- Location within Devon
- Population: 457 (2011)
- OS grid reference: SY140918
- Civil parish: Sidmouth
- District: East Devon
- Shire county: Devon
- Region: South West
- Country: England
- Sovereign state: United Kingdom
- Post town: SIDMOUTH
- Postcode district: EX10
- Police: Devon and Cornwall
- Fire: Devon and Somerset
- Ambulance: South Western
- UK Parliament: Honiton and Sidmouth

Sidbury is a large village and former civil parish north of Sidmouth, now in the parish of Sidmouth, in the East Devon district, in the county of Devon, England. In 2011 the built-up area had a population of 457.

It is situated on the A375 road and the River Sid, which rises at Crowpits Covert (OSGB36 grid reference SY138963) and runs for 6 miles (10 km) to Lyme Bay at Sidmouth. Above the village is Sidbury Castle, the site of an Iron Age hill fort.

Sidbury is mentioned in the Domesday Book as the manor of Sideberia, held by Bishop Osbern of Exeter.

The Church of St Peter and St Giles has a Norman tower topped with a spire, a Saxon crypt, a gunpowder storage room dating from the Napoleonic era and a 500-year-old font. The tower has eight bells, the earliest dating from 1662 and 1663. Six more were hung in 1712, 1750, 1752, 1776 and two in 1947 to complete the present eight. Both the tower and the rest of the church are Norman but the tower was accurately rebuilt in 1884. The north aisle is possibly 13th century and the south porch Perpendicular. The windows are medieval and of various periods; the octagonal font is Perpendicular. The church is a Grade I listed building. The actress Joan Hickson, known for her lead role in the television series Miss Marple, is buried in the churchyard under her married name of Joan Bogle Butler.

The village has a primary school, a village hall, a pub (the Red Lion), and one butcher's shop also selling groceries and newspapers. There is a working watermill in the village. The manor house, Sidbury Manor, lies 1 km (0.62 miles) northwest of the village centre. There is a regular bus service to Sidmouth and Exeter.

A small hamlet of Sidbury in the Eastern Cape province of South Africa, was founded by Lt. Richard Daniell, R.N. He had been native of this Devon village and was leader of Daniell party of 1820 Settlers to South Africa. He also helped found the Anglican church there and named it after his home church.

== Civil parish ==
In 1951 the parish had a population of 2,507. On 1 April 1974 the parish was abolished and merged with Sidmouth.

== Notable people ==
- Major Cyril Raikes MC
