= Manor of Holcombe Rogus =

Historic manor in Devon, England

Coordinates: 50.9629°N 3.3462°W

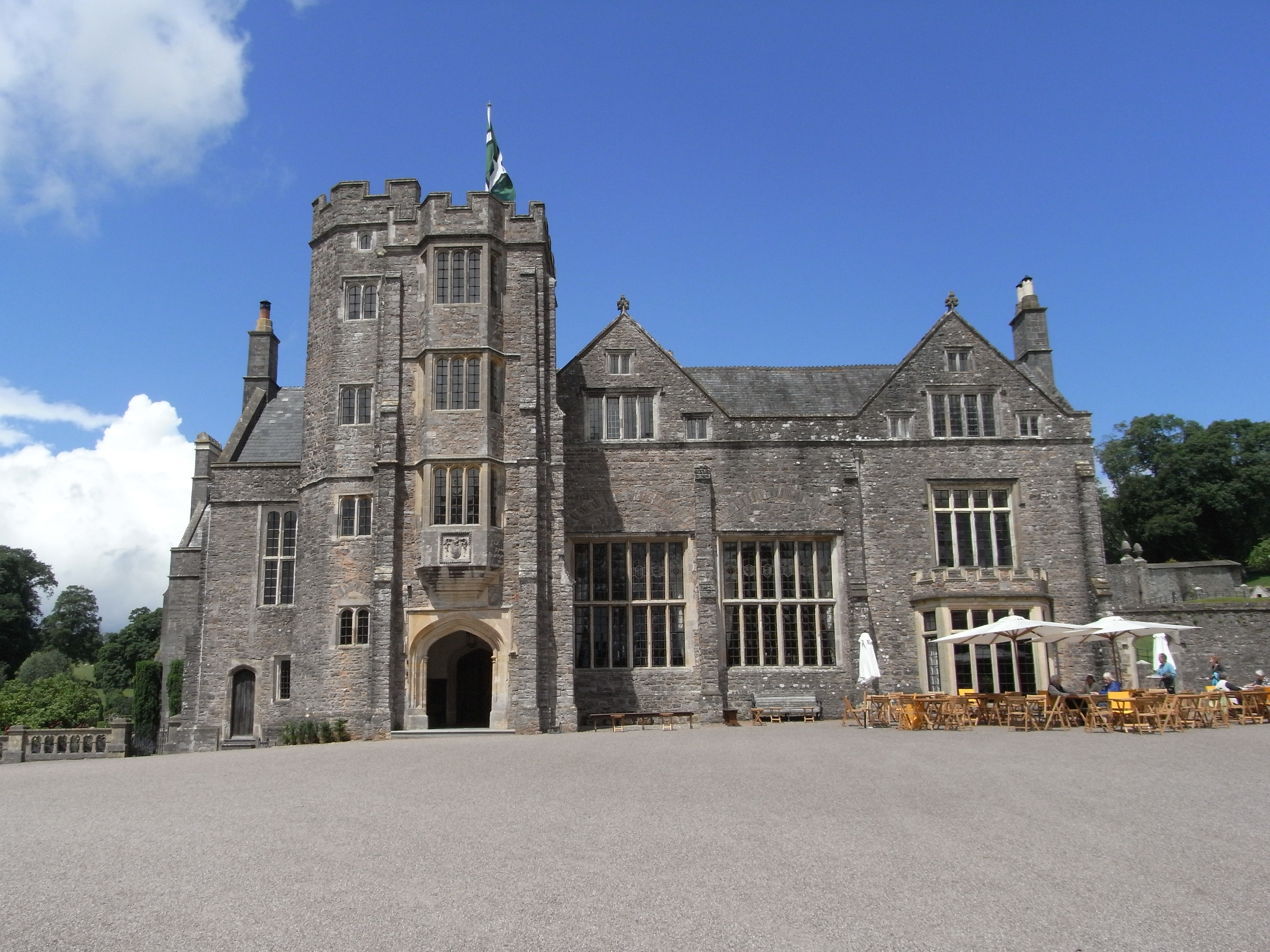
Holcombe Court, Holcombe Rogus, Devon. South front

Holcombe Rogus is a historic manor in the parish of Holcombe Rogus in Devon, England. The present grade I listed Tudor manor house known as Holcombe Court was built by Sir Roger Bluett c. 1540 and was owned by the Bluett family until 1858 when the estate was sold to Rev. William Rayer. The house is immediately to the west of the parish church. The gardens and grounds are screened off from the public road at the south by a high wall in which is a tall and broad entrance archway which forms the start of the entrance drive.

The manor of Holcombe Rogus had been acquired by the Bluett family in the early 15th century following the marriage of Sir John Bluett to Maude Chiseldon, daughter and co-heiress of John Chiseldon of Holcombe Rogus.

== Holcombe Court ==
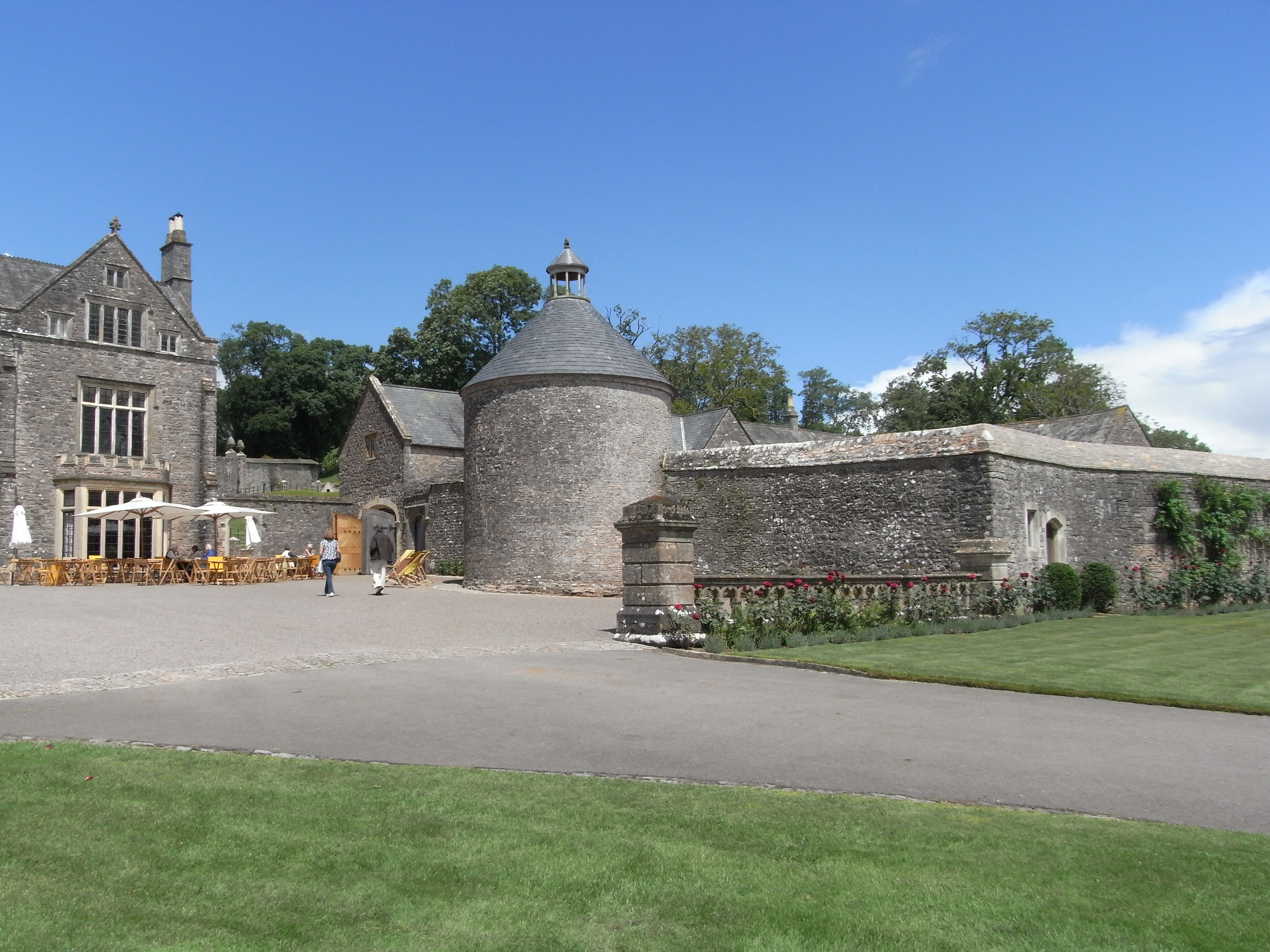
Holcombe Court and dovecote, entrance yard looking northwards

The south entrance front of Holcombe Court was described by Pevsner as "the most spectacular example of the Tudor style in Devon". The front porch is entered through a four-centred arch above which is a three-storey bay-window protruding and supported by corbels. The porch is surmounted by a massive buttressed tower with a staircase turret on its west (left) side. The front door opens into the screens passage which in its west side has not only the usual three doorways leading originally to buttery kitchen and pantry but also a fourth leading to the stair turret.

To the east (right) of the entrance is the great hall, which has two tall six-lighted windows with single transoms. The roof-space was subsequently ceiled to form a 65-foot long gallery above, said by Pevsner to be the best example from the 16th century in Devon. On its plaster ceiling survive the initials of the builder Sir Roger Bluett (died 1566), which makes it the earliest datable plaster ceiling in Devon. The north and west ranges were added or rebuilt in the Victorian age, c. 1859–68 by Rev. W. Rayer to the design of John Hayward. A prominent feature of the south aspect of the house is the large circular dovecote on the east (right) side, further east of which is the stable court yard

The Devon topographer Rev. John Swete (1752–1821) visited Holcombe Court as part of his travels in June 1800, and recorded the visit in his journal.

== Descent of the manor ==
=== Rogus ===
The Domesday Book of 1086 lists the manor as having been a member of Baldwin FitzGilbert's huge feudal barony of Okehampton, which comprised about 167 manors. Baldwin's tenant in 1086 was Rogo, who also held from him Hockworthy, Monkculm, Bernardsmoor, Tapps, Chevithorne and Colwell. The tenancy of the manor of Holcombe descended to his son who took as his family name the surname "FitzRogus". Risdon stated the manor in the reign of King Henry III (1216–1272) to have been held by Simon Filius Rogonis, who was succeeded by "Rogon Filius Simonis".

=== Chiseldon ===
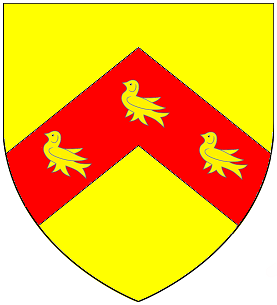
Arms of Chiseldon

- Richard Chiseldon married Margaret FitzRogus, daughter and heiress of Henry FitzRogus, and thus Holcombe passed to the Chiseldon family. Richard Chiseldon was the son of Richard (or Nicholas) Chiseldon by his wife Joan Tantifer, daughter and heiress of Walter Tantifer of Anke (modern: Aunk) in the parish of Clyst Hydon, Devon. The Chiseldons held in addition to Anke the manors of Rewe and South Tawton in Devon.
- John Chiseldon (died 1420), who married a certain "Jone"
- John Chiseldon, who married Elizabeth Warr, daughter of Richard Warr. He left no male issue, only two daughters as his co-heiresses to Holcombe Rogus, Anke, Rewe and South Tawton:
  - Margaret Chiseldon, who married Sir William Wadham. Her share of the estate was Anke, Rewe and South Tawton.
  - Matilda (or Maud) Chiseldon, who married Sir John (Roger) Bluett of Greenham, whose share was Holcombe Rogus.

=== Bluett ===
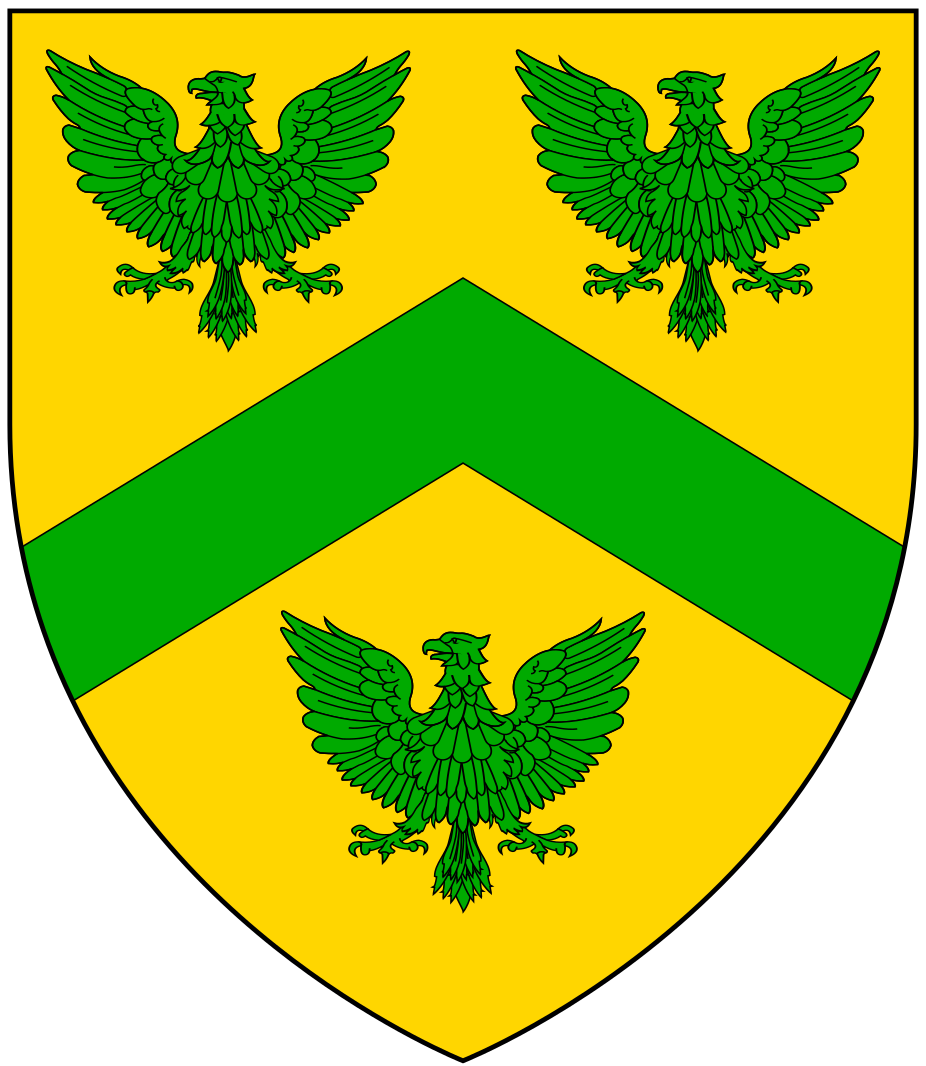
Arms of Bluett

The descent of Bluett of Holcombe Rogus is as follows:

- John Bluett married Maud Chiseldon by which means he inherited that manor.
- Walter Bluett (son), who married Jane St Maur, daughter of John St Maur by his wife Elizabeth Brooke
- Nicholas Bluett (died 1523) (son), who married Joane FitzJames, daughter of John FitzJames of Redlinch, Somerset.
- Richard Bluett (brother), whose monumental brass exists in St Nicholas' Church in Kittisford, Somerset. He rebuilt Cothay Manor. He married Mary Grenville, a daughter of Sir Thomas Grenville (died 1513) lord of the manor of Bideford in Devon and of Stowe in the parish of Kilkhampton in Cornwall.
- Sir Roger Bluett (1503–1566), eldest son. He married Jane Rowe (died 1583), eldest daughter of John Rowe (died 1544) of Kingston
- John Bluett (died 1585) (son), "of Greenham", who married Dorothy Blount (a first cousin of Lady Jane Grey)
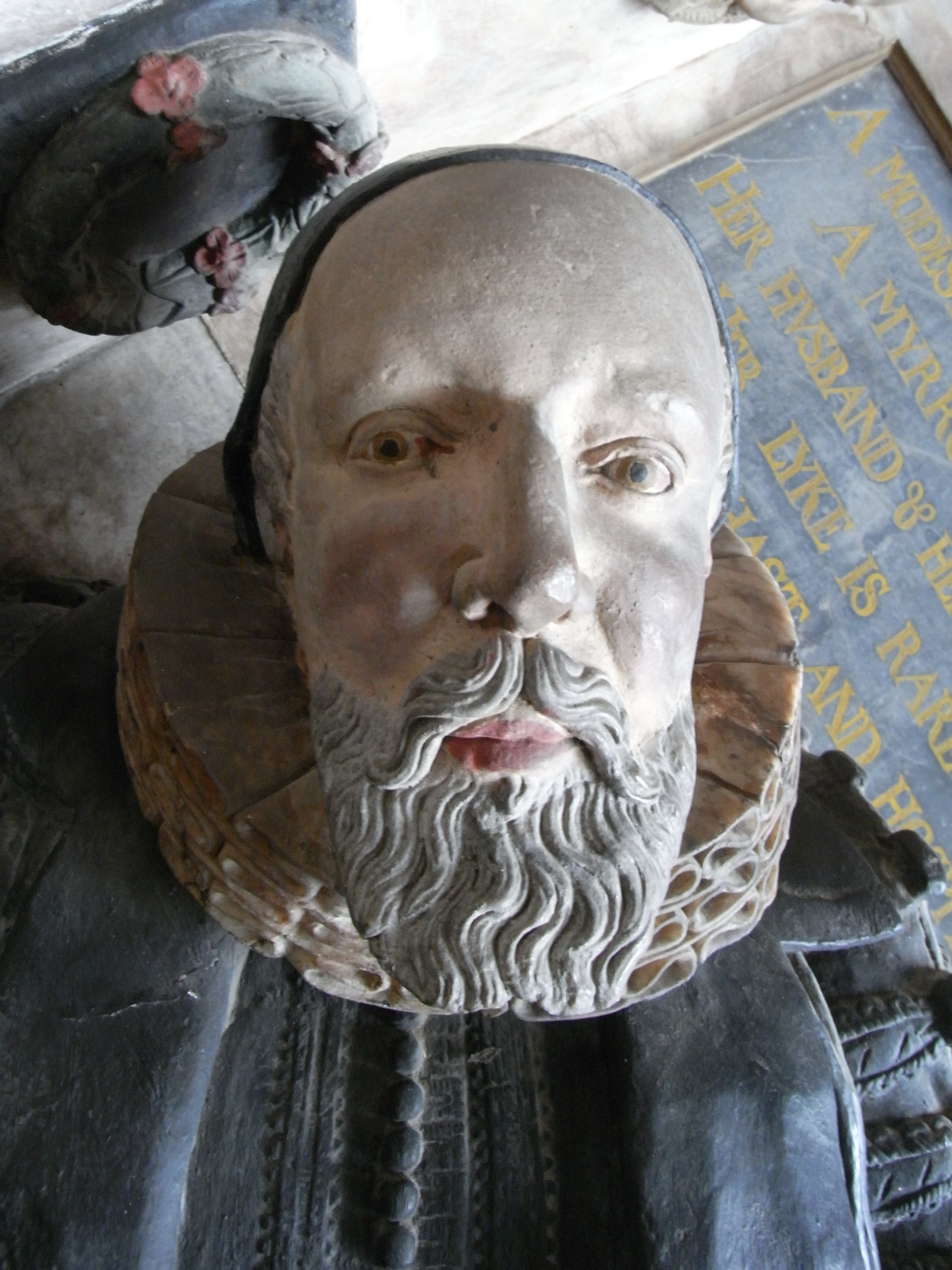
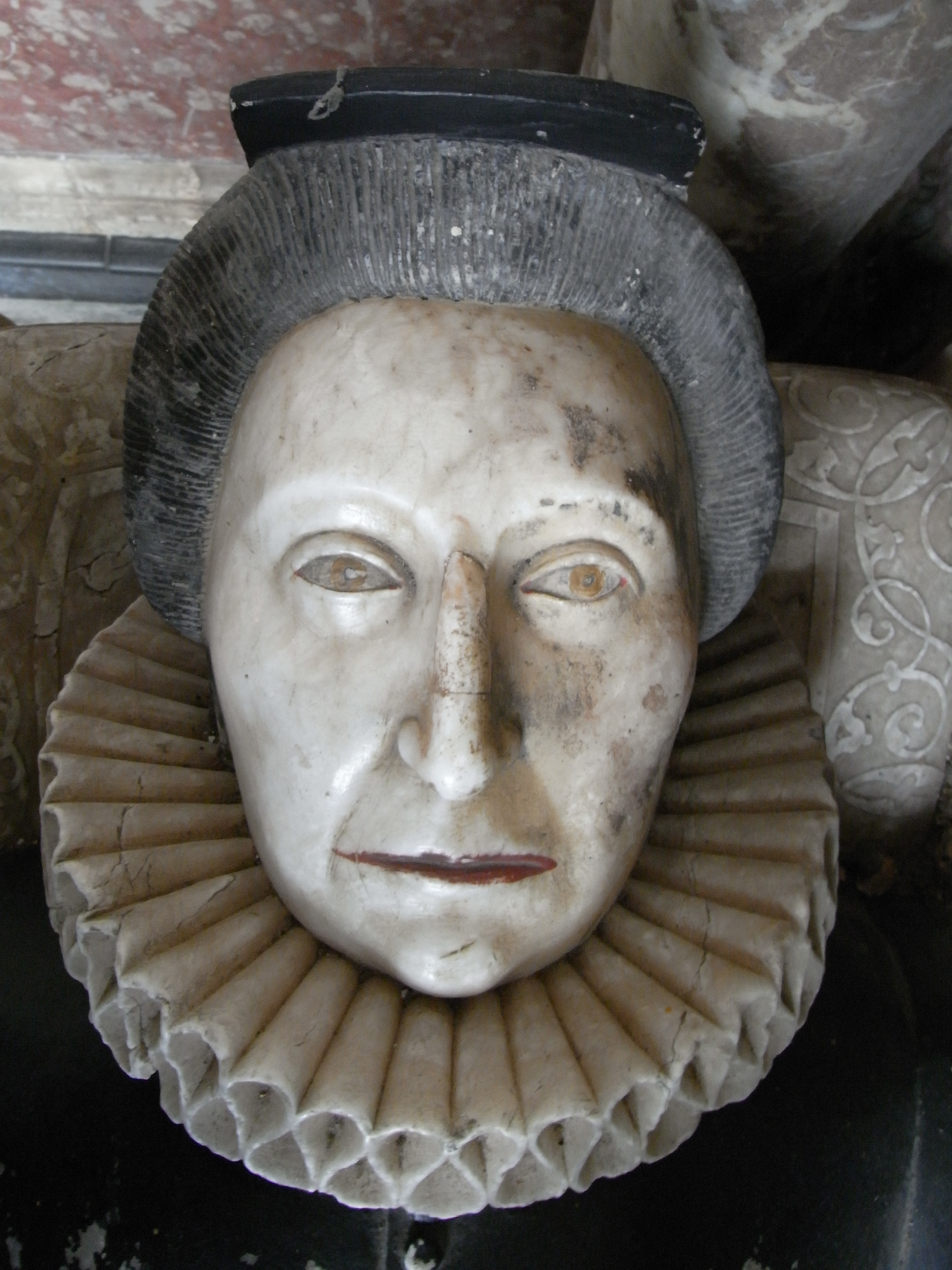
Left: Richard Bluett, Esq. (died 1614), and right his wife Mary Chichester (died 1613), detail from their effigies on their monument in Holcombe Rogus church
- Richard Bluett (died 1614) (son), whose monument with effigy exists in Holcombe Rogus Church. He married Mary Chichester (1548–1613), a daughter of Sir John Chichester (died 1569) of Raleigh. They 6 sons and 5 daughters, as is stated on their monument. Arthur Bluett (died 1612), his eldest son, predeceased his father.
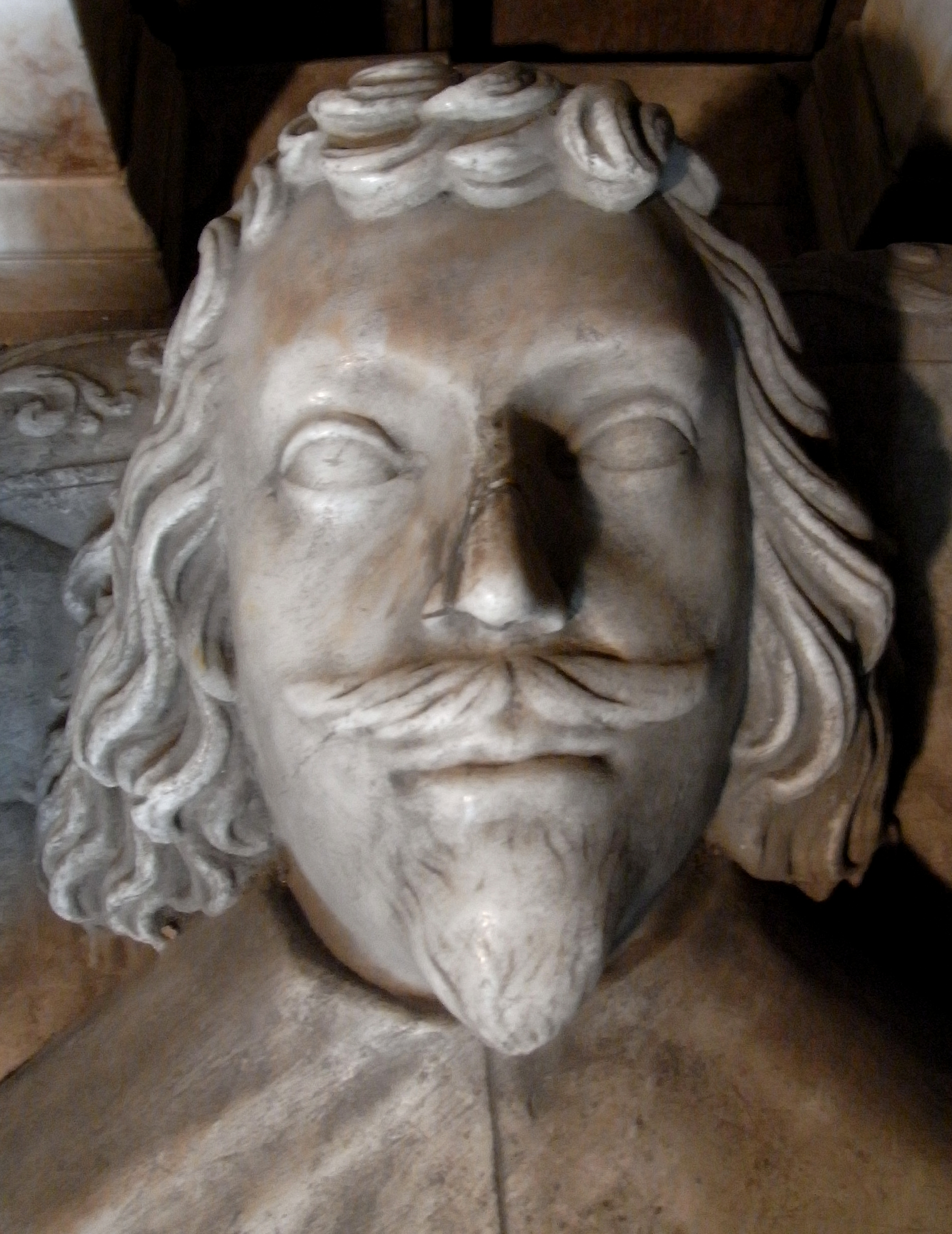
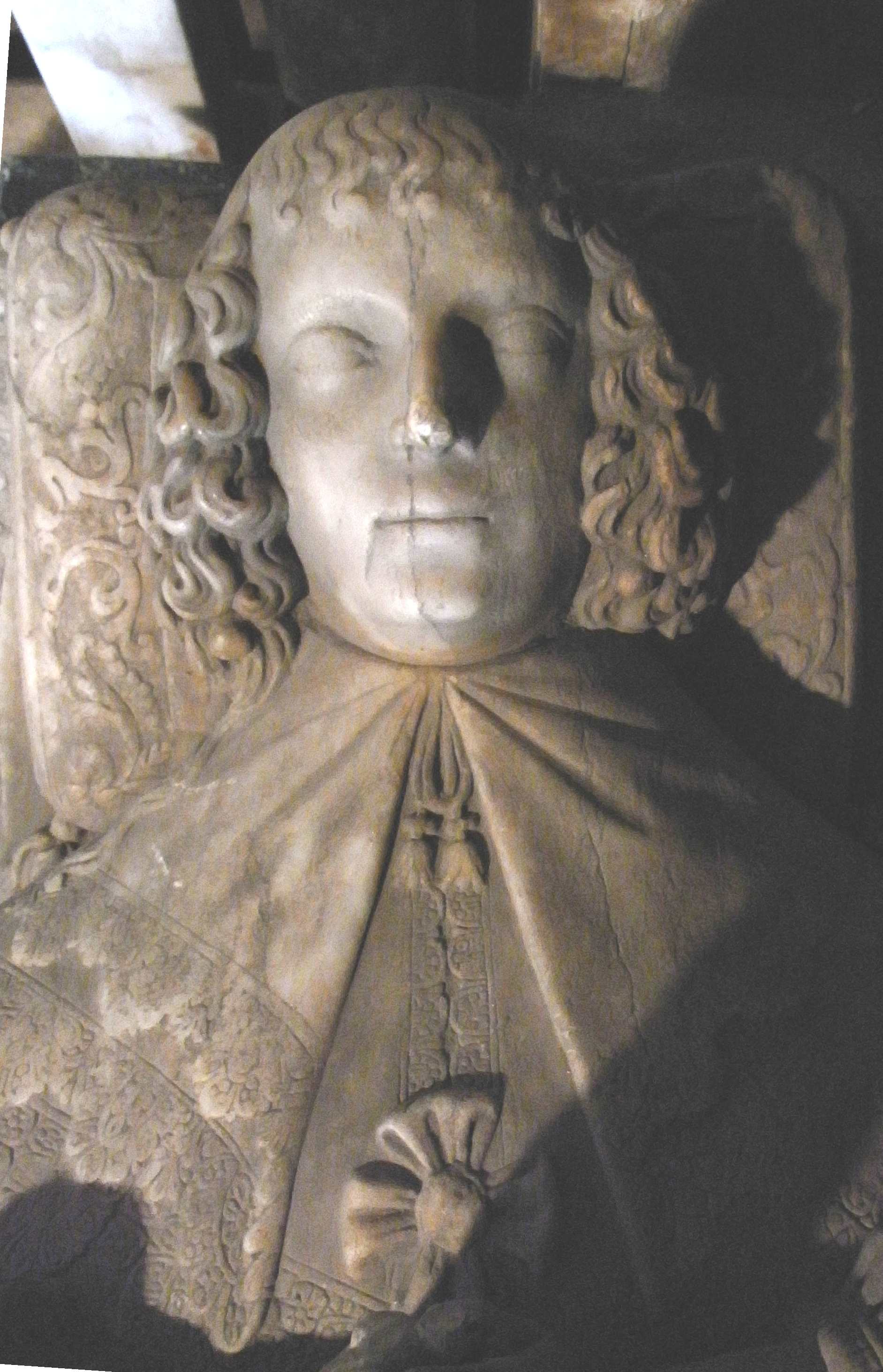
Sir John Bluett (1603-1634) and his wife Elizabeth Portman (1604-1636), of Holcombe Court, detail from their effigies in Holcombe Rogus church
- Sir John Bluett (1603–1634) (grandson, son of Arthur Bluett), MP for Tiverton 1628–29. His monument with effigy exists in Holcombe Rogus Church. He married Elizabeth Portman (1602–1636) by whom he had no sons but eight daughters who were prevented from inheriting the manor by tail-male, and the heir was his brother Francis.
- Col. Francis Bluett (died 1644) (brother), a Royalist during the Civil War, was killed at the Siege of Lyme Regis in 1644. He married Joan, and had two sons, John and Francis.
- John Bluett (eldest son), died childless.
- Francis Bluett (1638–1691) (brother), killed in battle in 1691 during the Glorious Revolution. He was the last of the male line of the senior branch. His heir was his fifth cousin Robert Bluett (died 1725) of Little Colan in Cornwall.
- Robert Bluett (died 1725) (fifth cousin), of Little Colan in Cornwall. He married Keren-Happuch Wood, daughter of Robert Wood, LLD, of "Shenville", in Essex, by whom he had ten children. His mural monument exists in Holcombe Rogus Church.
- John Bluett (eldest son), married Anne Hart daughter of Percival Hart of Lullingstone Castle in Kent. He was instrumental in settling the affairs of the South Sea Company in 1720–1. He left no sons.
- Rev. Robert Bluett (died 1749) (brother). He married Jane Webster, 3rd daughter of Sir Thomas Webster, 1st Baronet (1676–1751), MP for Colchester 1705–1711, 1713–1714 and 1722–1727, of Battle Abbey in Sussex.
- John Edward Robert Bluett (died 1766) (son) died aged 17.
- Buckland Nutcombe Bluett (died 1786) (uncle), married Hannah Hill, daughter of Richard Hill Esq., of Kerswell Priory, Broadhembury, Devon. He erected a mural monument to his father and elder brothers in Holcombe Rogus Church. He died without sons and bequeathed the manor to his supposed distant cousin Peter Bluett, of Falmouth in Cornwall, whom after much personal research he deemed to have been descended from Colan Bluett of Little Colan, who died in the early 17th century.
- Peter Bluett (1767–1843), of Falmouth (supposed cousin), died childless.
- William Bluett (brother) of Bath, Somerset.
- Peter Frederick Bluett (son), in 1830 at Trinity, Jersey, he married Caroline Lefever. He was living at Holcombe Court in 1848. In 1849 he donated land within the manor for the building of a school. In 1858 he sold the manor of Holcombe Rogus to Rev. William Rayer.

== Sources ==
- Brooke-Webb, Michael V. (2006) Revised edition of Gabriel, Andrew & Fletcher, Barbara, A Short History of Holcombe Rogus, c. 1986.
- Pevsner, N., & Cherry, B., The Buildings of England: Devon, London, 2004.
- Pole, William, Sir (died 1635), Collections Towards a Description of the County of Devon, Sir John-William de la Pole (ed.), London, 1791.
- Risdon, Tristram (died 1640), Survey of Devon. With considerable additions. London, 1811.
- Vivian, J.L., Lt.Col. (Ed.), The Visitations of Cornwall, Comprising the Heralds' Visitations of 1530, 1573 & 1620. Exeter, 1887.
