= John Bluett =

English politician

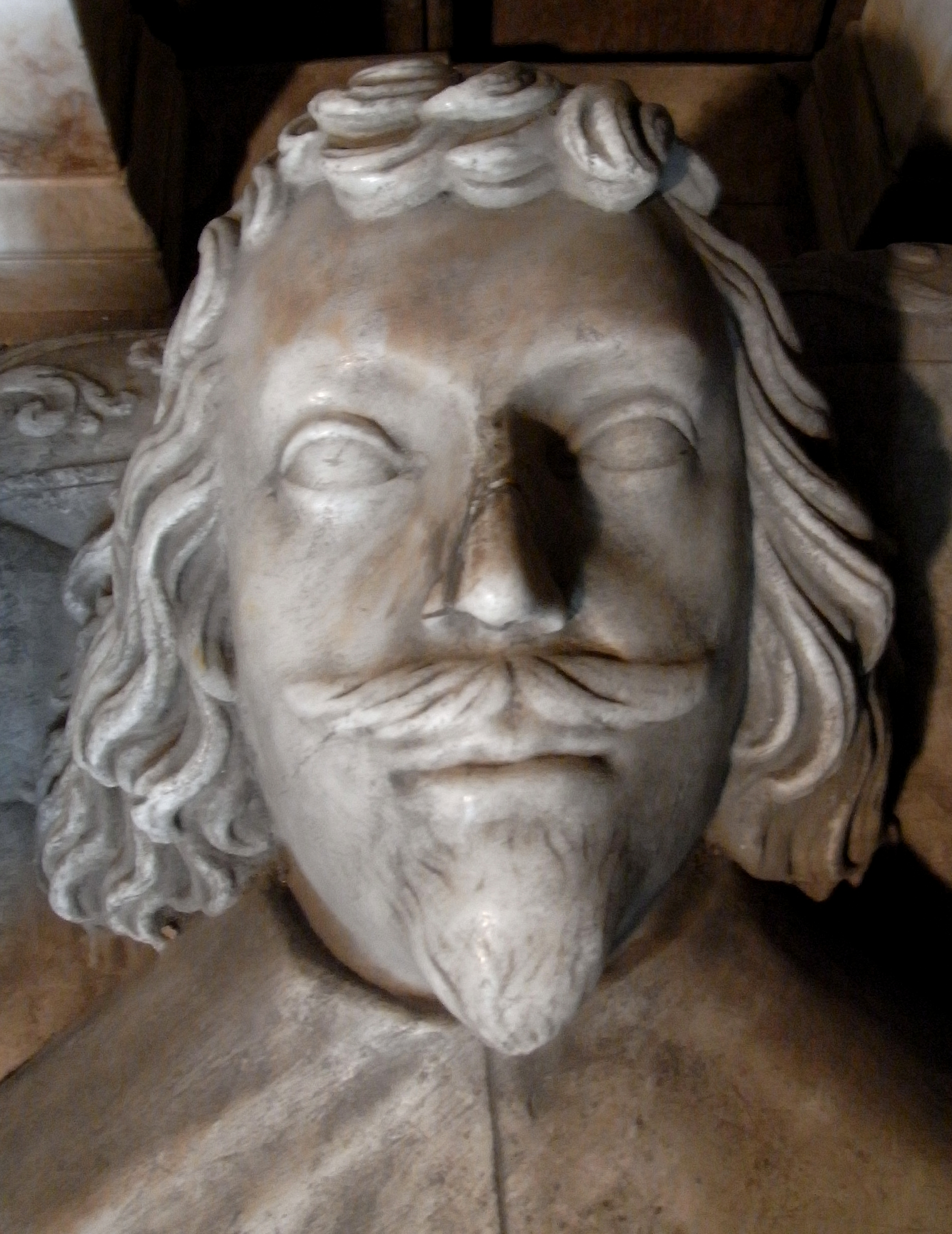
Sir John Bluett (1603-1634)of Holcombe Court, detail from his effigy in the Bluett Chapel, All Saints Church, Holcombe Rogus, Devon

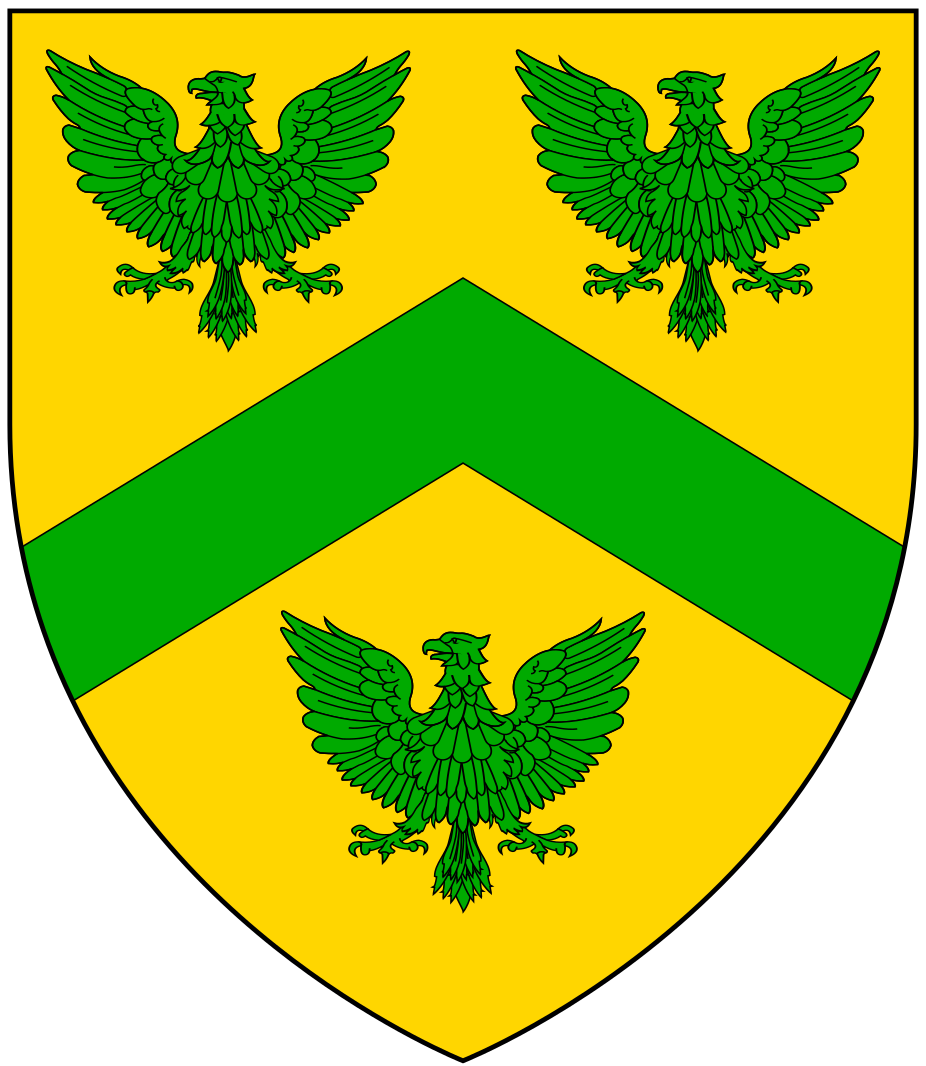
Arms of Bluett: Or, a chevron between three eagles displayed vert

John Bluett (1603 – 28 November 1634) of Holcombe Court, lord of the manor of Holcombe Rogus in Devon, was MP for Tiverton from 1628 to 1629 when King Charles I embarked on his Personal Rule without parliament for eleven years.

== Origins ==
John Bluett was the son of Arthur Bluett (1573/4-1612) of Holcombe Rogus by his wife Jane Lancaster (1583-1641), daughter and heiress of John Lancaster of Bagborough, Somerset. John was left fatherless aged nine when Arthur Bluett died in 1612, predeceasing his own father Richard Bluett (d.1614), whose monument with effigy exists in the Bluett Chapel of Holcombe Rogus Church. John's mother Joan remarried to Philip Poyntz, a recusant, probably of the ancient Poyntz family of Iron Acton in Gloucestershire, whose grave-slab in the Bluett Chapel records his death on 16 August 1645: "Here lyeth the body of Phillip Pointz, gent., who deceased the 16 day of August Anno Dom(ini) 1645. My flesh shall rest in hope, psal. 16:9". The much worn grave slab of Joan exists also in the floor of the Bluet Chapel, inscribed thus: "In memoriam...Joa...Poyntz olim Arthuri Bluet ar(mi)g(e)ri at nuper Philippi Poyntz, gent...conjugis charissima obiit 19.o die Junii...aetatis 58.o et salutis 1641. Parce...hic mea...sic mea... servari in creda sanguin.." ("In memory of Joan Poyntz once the most beloved wife of Arthur Bluet, Esq., and recently of Philip Poyntz, gent. She died on the 19th day of June...of her age 58 and health 1641...Spare me...this my...to serve in the blood...") Also inscribed on the same slab is the following: "The remains of her younger son Coll. Francis Bluet & Joan his wife lye here interr'd also. He was kill'd before Lyme 1644"

=== Ancestry & heraldic quarterings ===
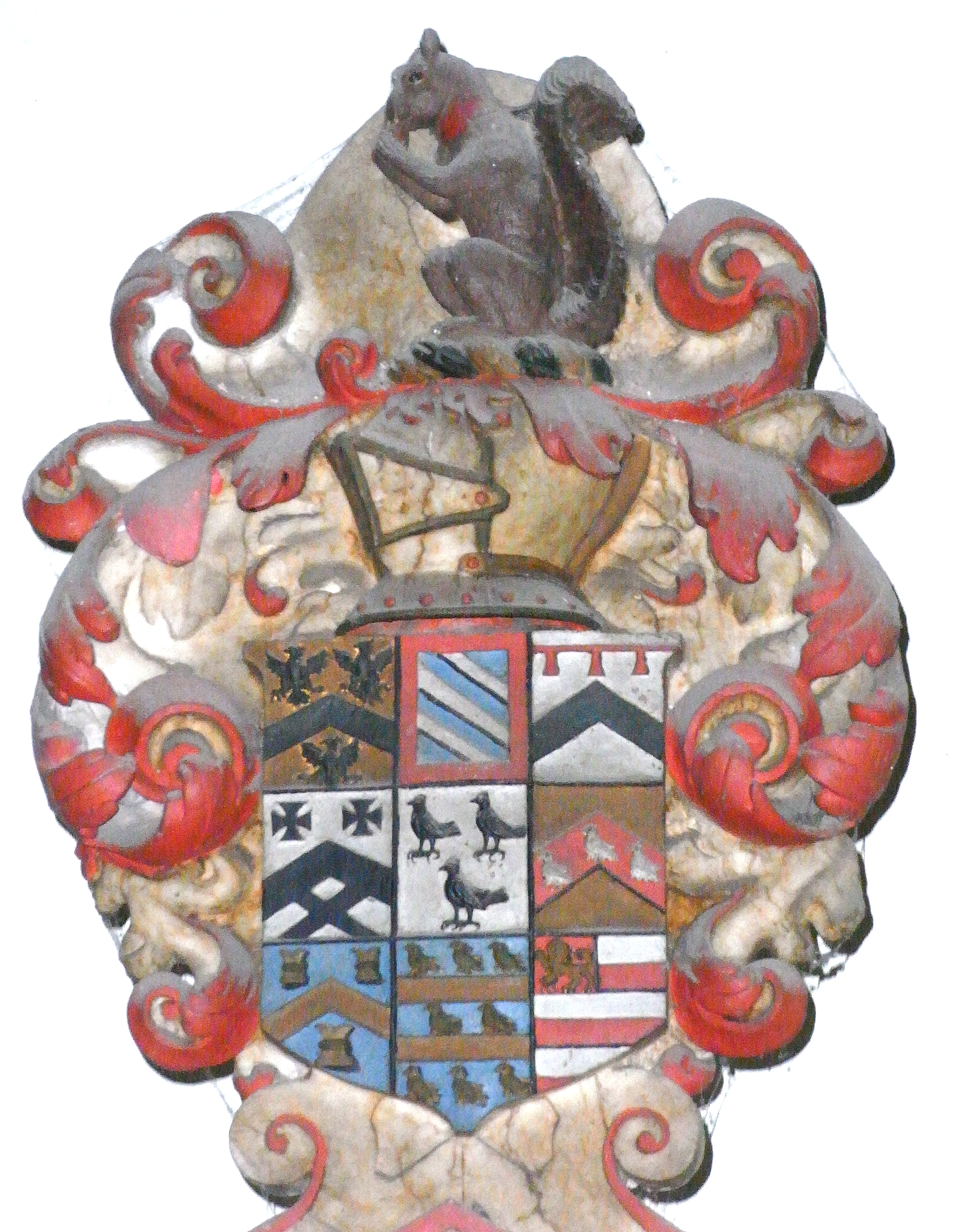
Escutcheon above monument to Sir John Bluett (d.1634) in Holcombe Rogus Church, showing 8 quarterings with the Bluett crest above, a squirrell eating a nut

The heraldic escutcheon on John Bluett's monument shows 8 quarterings as follows, which demonstrate his ancestry from heraldic heiresses:

- 1st: Or, a chevron between three eagles displayed vert (Bluett)
- 2nd: Azure, three bendlets argent each close-cottised in base sable a bordure gules
- 3rd: Argent, a chevron sable a label of three points gules (Prideaux)
- 4th: Argent, a chevron between in chief three crosses pattées in base a saltire sable
- 5th: Argent, three ravens/choughs sable/proper
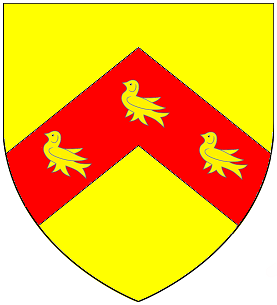
- 6th: Or, on a chevron gules three martlets or (Chiselden of Holcombe Rogus) The martlets are shown here argent.
- 7th: Azure, a chevron argent between three chess-rooks or (Rogus of Holcombe, an heiress of Chesilden); the chevron is shown here or.
- 8th: Azure, two bars between nine martlets argent, 3,3,2,1 (shown here as Azure, two bars between eight martlets or, 3,2,3) Tantifer (alias Tatifer, Tantifer, Taundifer, Fattifer) of Anke, (modern "Aunk") Clyst Hydon, an heiress of Chesilden
- 9th: Barry of six argent and gules, on a canton of the second a lion passant or (Lancaster of Milverton), the family of Bluett's mother)

== Career ==
Bluett's father died in 1612, leaving him at the age of nine in the care of his grandfather Richard Bluett (d.1614), who died two years later. He then became heir to the family's 16 manors in Somerset, Devon and Dorset. As a tenant-in-chief he became a ward of the king, who sold his wardship to his great-uncle Arthur Chichester, 1st Baron Chichester (1563-1625), Lord Deputy of Ireland. On 16 April 1619 aged 15, he matriculated at Wadham College, Oxford, founded (posthumously) only nine years before in 1610 by his distant cousin Nicholas Wadham (died 1609) of Merryfield, Somerset and Edge, Branscombe, Devon. Nicholas's ancestor Sir William Wadham (died 1452) had married the other Chiselden co-heiress, Margaret Chiseldon, whose sister Maude Chiseldon had brought Holcombe Rogus to the Bluetts. He presented a gold flagon to Wadham College which was melted down for coin tempore Charles I. In 1628 he was elected Member of Parliament for Tiverton, Devon.

== Marriage and children ==
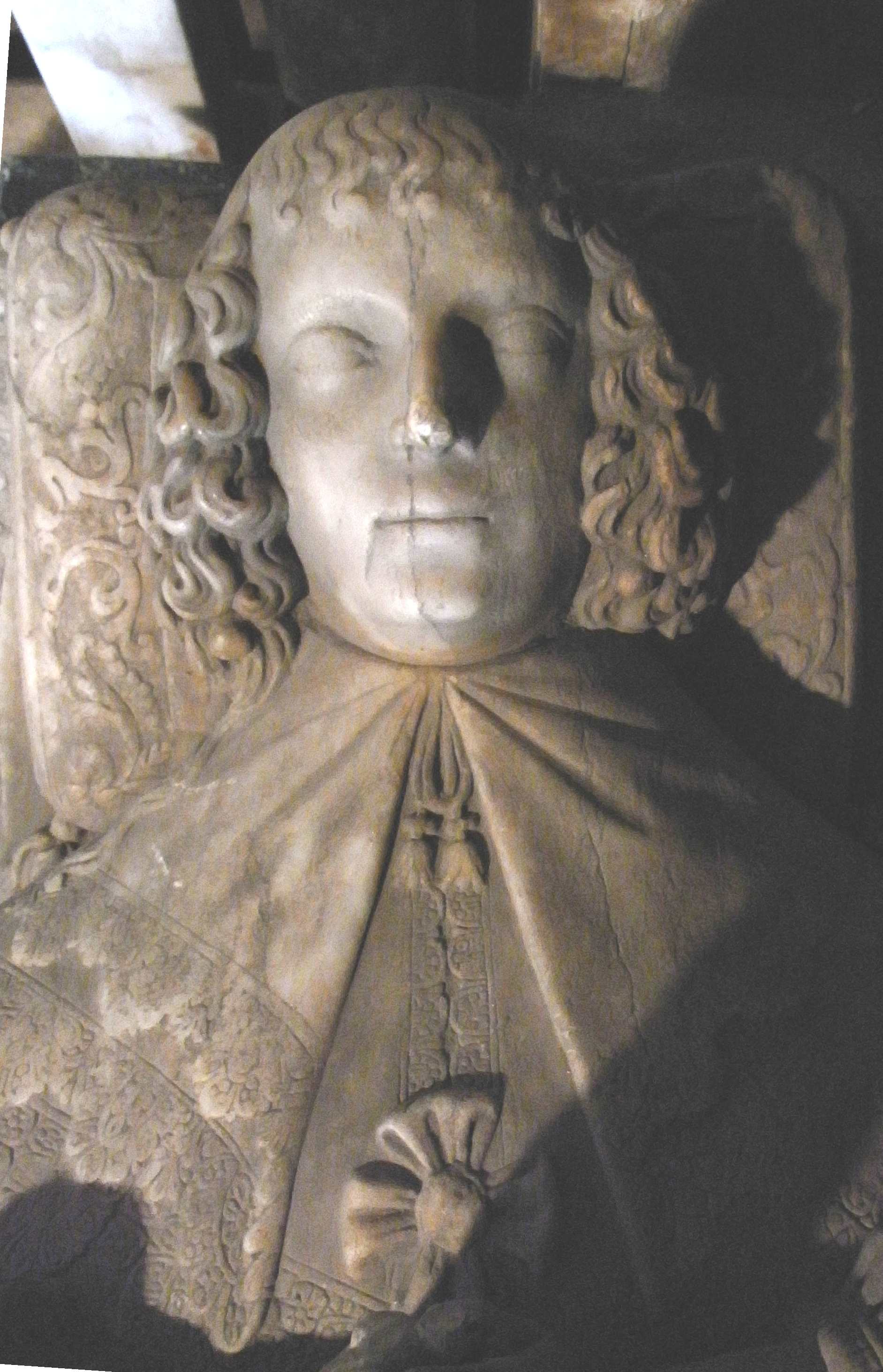
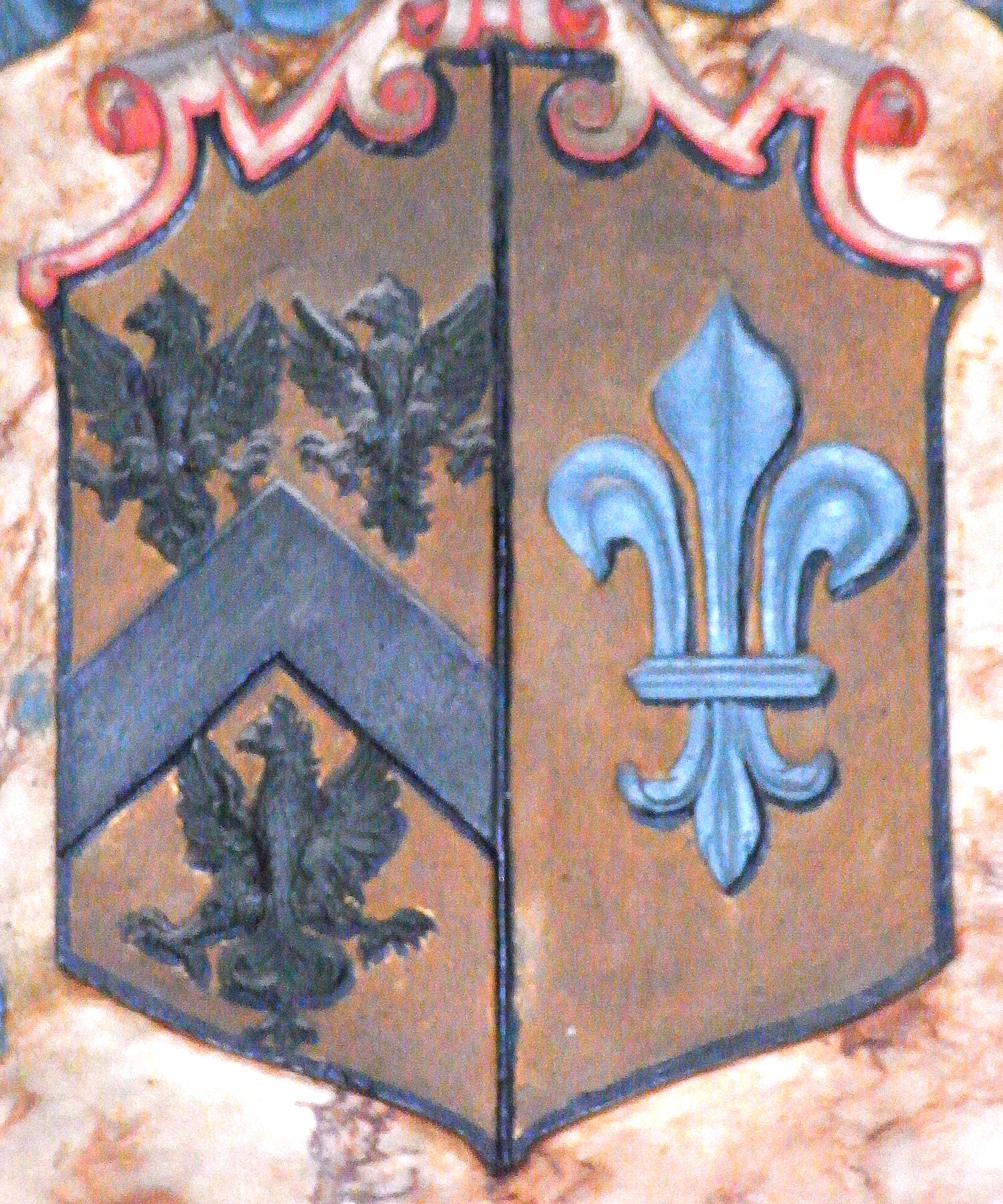
Elizabeth Portman (1604-1636), wife of Sir John Bluett. Escutcheon showing arms of Bluet impaling Portman: Or, a fleur-de-lis azure, details from monument to Sir John Bluett (d.1634) in Holcombe Rogus Church

Bluett married Elizabeth Portman (1602-1636), whose effigy exists beside that of her husband under their canopied monument in the Bluett Chapel, Holcombe Rogus Church. She was a daughter of Sir John Portman, 1st Baronet (d.1612), of Orchard Portman in Somerset. They had no son and heir but four daughters, none of whom were able to inherit the Manor of Holcombe Rogus due to tail-male, but did inherit shares in the Rectories & Advowsons of Hockworthy, Burlescombe, Sampford Arundel and Holcombe Rogus. As well as the Hundred of Milverton, Manors such as North Petherton, Greenham, Somerset Shippen, Chipstable in Somerset, The Manor of Sturminster Marshall, Dorset and The Manor of Holcombe Buhill with property and land in the Parish of Holcombe Rogus and Sampford Peverell (lands acquired by Sir Roger Bluett following the dissolution of the monasteries). Their kneeling effigies exist along the base of the monument to their parents at Holcombe Rogus. Of the eight daughters depicted, the eldest, 4th, 5th & 6th all carry skulls indicating they were dead by 1636. The four survivors married into the families of Jones, Wallop, Lenthall and Basset:

- Ann Bluett (d.1683) married Cadwallader Jones of Greenham, Somerset.
- Mary Bluett married firstly Sir James Stonehouse (d.1654), and secondly Sir John Lenthall, 1st Baronet(d.1681), whose father was Speaker of the House of Commons
- Dorothy Bluett (d.1704), married Henry Wallop (d.1673), whose grandson was John Wallop, 1st Earl of Portsmouth (1690-1762), who succeeded his elder brother Bluett Wallop (d.1707) in the Wallop estates in Hampshire and elsewhere.
- Susan Bluett (d.1662) who married John Basset (1630-1660) of Heanton Punchardon, Devon, whose mural monument exists in Heanton Punchardon Church. Their son was John Bassett (1653-1686), five times MP for Barnstaple in Devon.

== Death and burial ==
Bluett died at the age of 31 and was buried in the Bluett Chapel in All saints Church, Holcombe Rogus, where there exists an elaborate monument with his effigy and that of his wife.

== Succession ==
Bluett was succeeded by his younger brother Col. Francis Bluett (d.1644), an ardent Royalist during the Civil War who was killed in 1644 at the Siege of Lyme Regis.

== Monument ==
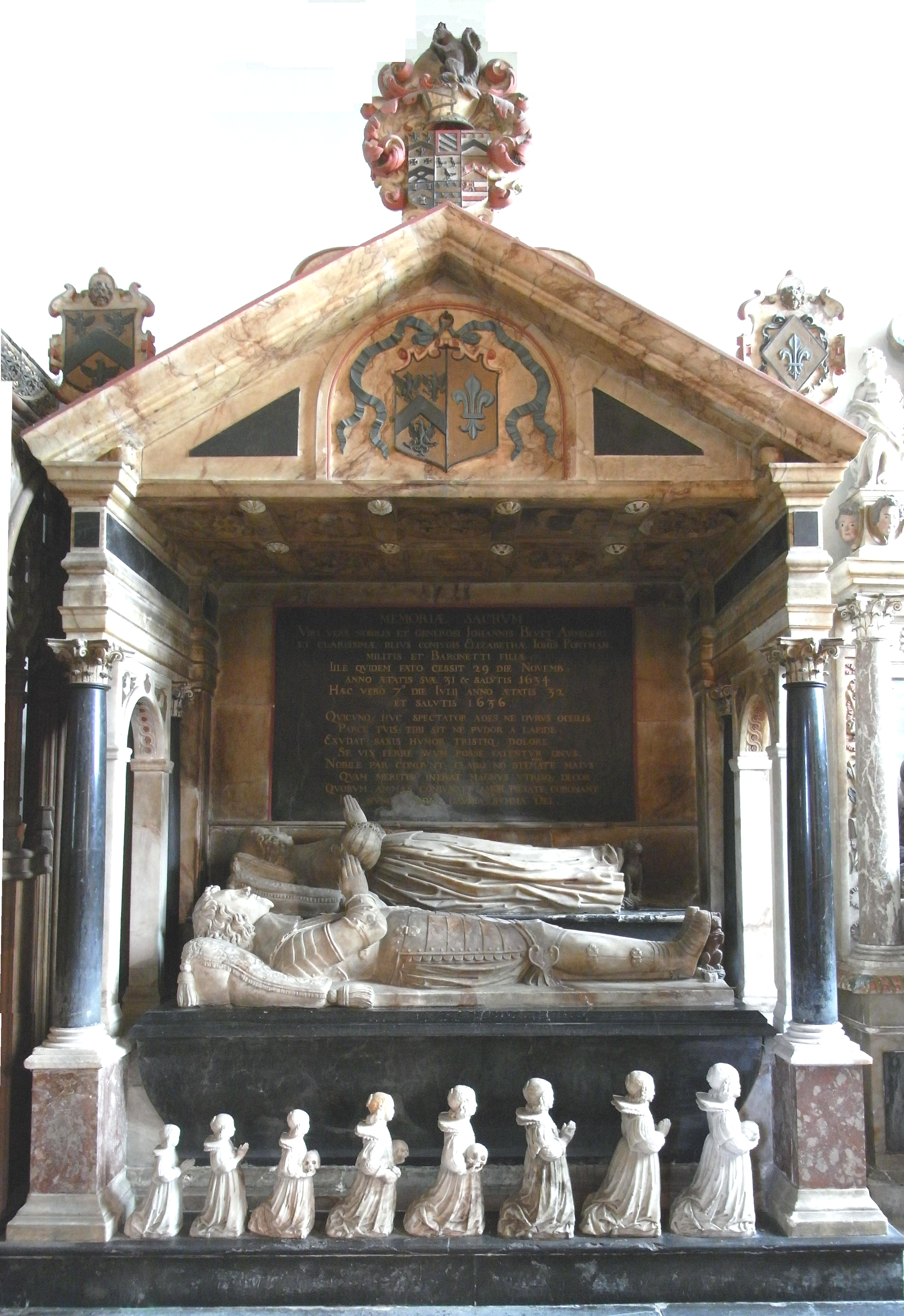
Monument to Sir John Bluett (d.1634) and his wife Elizabeth Portman (d.1636), Bluett Chapel, All Saints Church, Holcombe Rogus. Of the eight daughters kneeling below, the eldest, 4th, 5th & 6th all carry skulls indicating prior decease

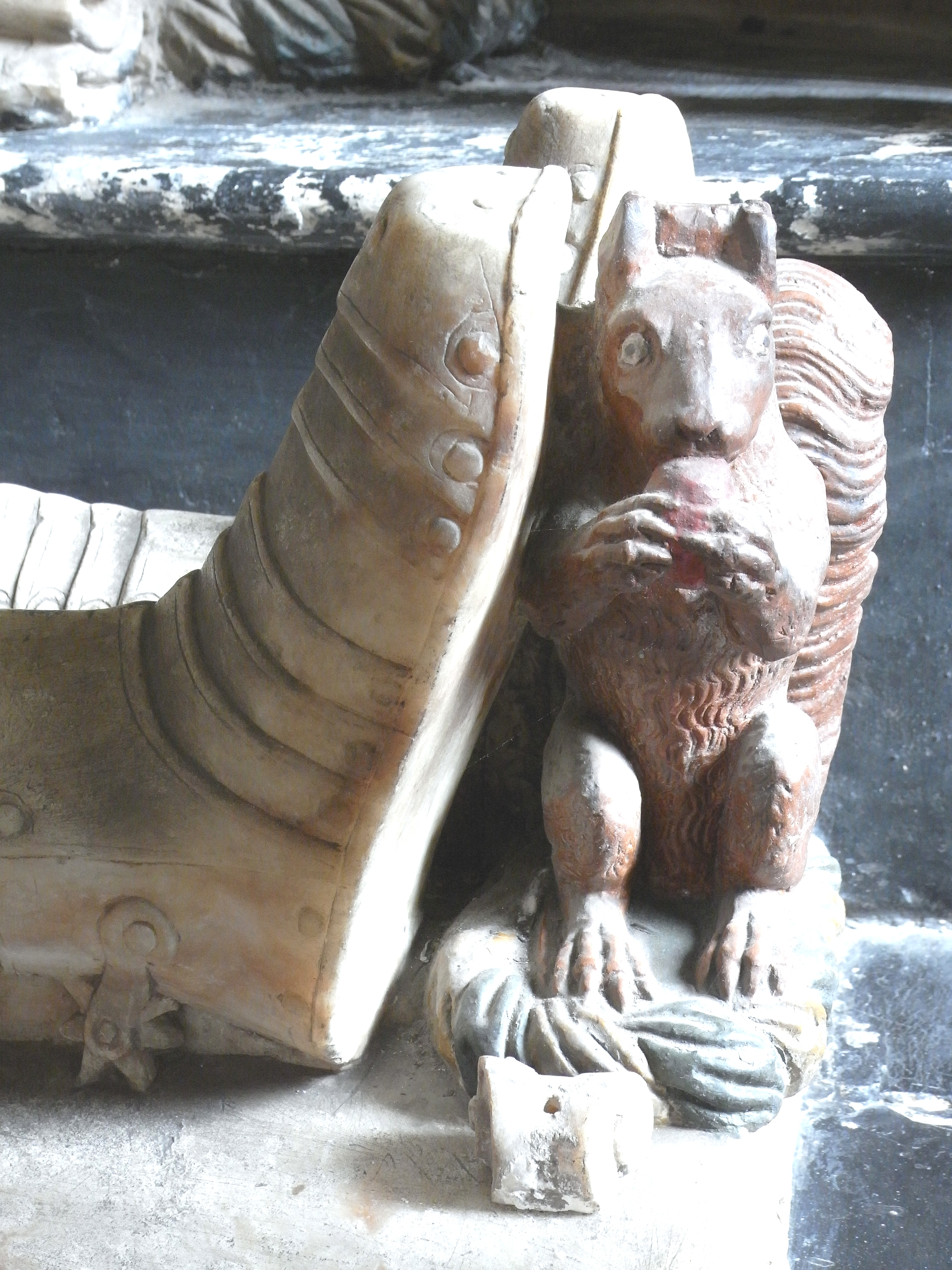
Squirrel crest of Bluett family serving as footrest to effigy of Sir John Bluett (d.1634) in Holcombe Rogus Church

An elaborate marble monument to Sir John Bluett (d.1634) and his wife Elizabeth Portman (d.1636) exists in the Bluett Chapel, All Saints Church, Holcombe Rogus. Alabaster recumbent effigies of the couple are contained under a classical canopy. Sir John is dressed in full armour of Almain rivets and his head rests on a pillow with lace border in which is worked the Bluett crest of a squirrel eating a nut. The squirrel also appears as his footrest. A tablet above is inscribed thus:
"Memoriae sacrum viri vere nobilis et generosi Johannis Bluet Armigeri et clarissimae ilius conjugis Elizabethae Joh(ann)is Portman, Militis et Baronetti, filiae. Ille quidem fato cessit 29 die Novemb(re) anno aetatis suae 31 & salutis 1634. Haec vero 7.o die Julii anno aetatis 32 et salutis 1636. Quicunq(ue) huc spectator ades, ne durus oceilis parce tuis tibi sit ne pudor a lapide exudat saxis humor tristiq(ue) dolore se vix ferre suum posse patentur onus nobile par condunt claro (ho..?) stemate malus quam meritis inerat magnus utrisq(ue) decor quorum animas conjunxit... pietate coronant has nu.. Dei" ("Sacred to the memory of the truly noble and well-born John Bluet, Esquire, and to the most renowned wife of him, Elizabeth, daughter of John Portman, Knight and Baronet. The former indeed proceeded to his destiny on the 29 day of November in the year of his age 31 and (in the year) of grace 1634. The latter in truth on the 7th day of July in the year of her age 32 and of grace 1636. Whoever, O Spectator you are here, do not... harshly, spare your...for you there should be no shame. From the stone exudes moisture from the rocks and with sad grief. If by chance...........")

== Sources ==
- Yerby, George & Hunneyball, Paul, Biography of Bluett (Blewett), John (1603-1634), of Holcombe Rogus, Devon, published in History of Parliament: House of Commons 1604-1629, ed. Andrew Thrush and John P. Ferris, 2010

Parliament of England
Preceded by John Drake; Peter Ball	Member of Parliament for Tiverton; 1628; With: Peter Ball	Parliament suspended until 1640
