= Peter Sainthill =

Peter Sainthill may refer to:

- Peter Sainthill (died 1571) (1524–1571), Member of Parliament for Grampound, and for Saltash
- Peter Sainthill (MP for Tiverton) (1593–1648), Member of Parliament for Tiverton in Devon
- Peter Sainthill (surgeon) (1698–1775), British 18th-century surgeon and Fellow of the Royal Society
