= Bradninch =

Town in Devon, England

Coordinates: 50.8333°N 3.4167°W

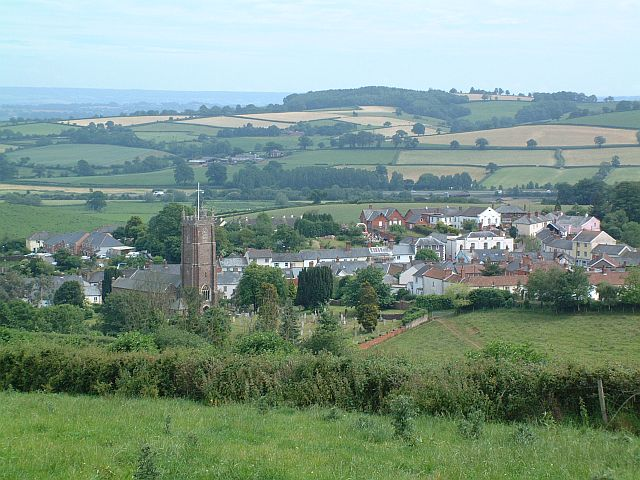
- Bradninch from Castle Hill. St Disen's Church is to the left

- Location within Devon
- Population: 2,165 (2021 census)
- OS grid reference: SS9903
- District: Mid Devon
- Shire county: Devon
- Region: South West
- Country: England
- Sovereign state: United Kingdom
- Post town: EXETER
- Postcode district: EX5
- Dialling code: 01392
- Police: Devon and Cornwall
- Fire: Devon and Somerset
- Ambulance: South Western
- UK Parliament: Central Devon

Bradninch is a small town, civil parish and manor in Devon, England, lying about 3 miles (5 km) south of Cullompton. Much of the surrounding farmland belongs to the Duchy of Cornwall although the Duchy announced in March 2026 that they would be "withdrawing from Bradninch" and their farms and other properties are in the process of being sold (September 2026). There is an electoral ward with the same name, which since May 2023 comprises the entire parish. The population was 2,165 in 2021.

In 2012, in research of 2,400 postcodes in England and Wales which took into account 60 separate factors of interest to young families, Bradninch was found to be the fifteenth most family friendly location in the country.

The town is twinned with Landunvez in Brittany and Downingtown, Pennsylvania.

== Toponymy ==
The place-name 'Bradninch' is first attested in the Domesday Book of 1086, where it appears as 'Bradenese'; the name is thought to mean 'broad oak' or 'broad ash'. Seventy-nine different spellings of the name of the town have been recorded.

== History ==
=== Anglo-Saxon ===
Bradninch dates back to before the 7th century and at some time there was almost certainly a Norman or Anglo-Saxon fortress on Castle Hill. There are no physical remains, and no known primary documentary references, but the likely site was surrounded by a number of 'castle' field names on the tithe map. It would have been unusual for Bradninch not to have had a castle given its status in the medieval period.

=== Norman ===
Bradninch was the caput of the feudal barony of Bradninch granted by William the Conqueror (1066–1087) to William Capra, who is listed in the Domesday Book of 1086 as holding this manor. The barony escheated to the crown and King Henry I (1100–1135) granted it to William I de Tracy (d.circa 1136). He left one daughter and sole-heiress Grace de Tracy who married John de Sudeley, They had two children: Ralph de Sudeley (died 1192), the eldest, who became his father's heir, and Sir William II "de Tracy" (d. post 1172), who inherited his mother's barony of Bradninch and assumed her family name in lieu of his patronymic. He married Hawise de Born and had a son William III de Tracy (d. pre-1194), one of the four knights who assassinated Thomas Becket, Archbishop of Canterbury, in December 1170.

=== The value of Bradninch ===
Following the execution of King Charles I in 1649, an Act of Parliament was passed which allowed the sale of the feudal barony of Bradninch (or "honour of Bradninch") together with its caput, namely the manor of Bradninch, together with the borough of Bradninch, and on 24 March 1650 all were sold for the sum of £19,517 11 shillings 10 1/4 pence to Thomas Sanders and John Gorges as trustees for the new Commonwealth. The feudal barony and manor were returned to the Dukedom of Cornwall following the Restoration of the Monarchy in 1660 although the feudal element of the holding was effectively extinguished at about the same time by the Tenures Abolition Act 1660.

William, Prince of Wales as the present Duke of Cornwall, remains the nominal lord of the manor of Bradninch, and the theoretical feudal baron of Bradninch, and the Duchy of Cornwall continues to own much of the land within the parish.

=== Later history ===
The town was largely destroyed in a fire in 1666 (the same year as the Great Fire of London).

Bradninch lost its borough status in 1886 under the provisions of the Municipal Corporations Act. The property of the corporation, including Bradninch Guildhall, has since been vested in the Bradninch Town Trust, which is a separate organisation to the town council, though four of its nine trustees are appointed by the town council.

== Notable buildings ==
Notable buildings in the town include Bradninch Guildhall (on which the Bradninch Eagle is depicted), The Castle (public house), the Manor House, Earlsland House, Comfort House, and the parish church. A large part of the town is covered by a conservation area, first designated in 1973.

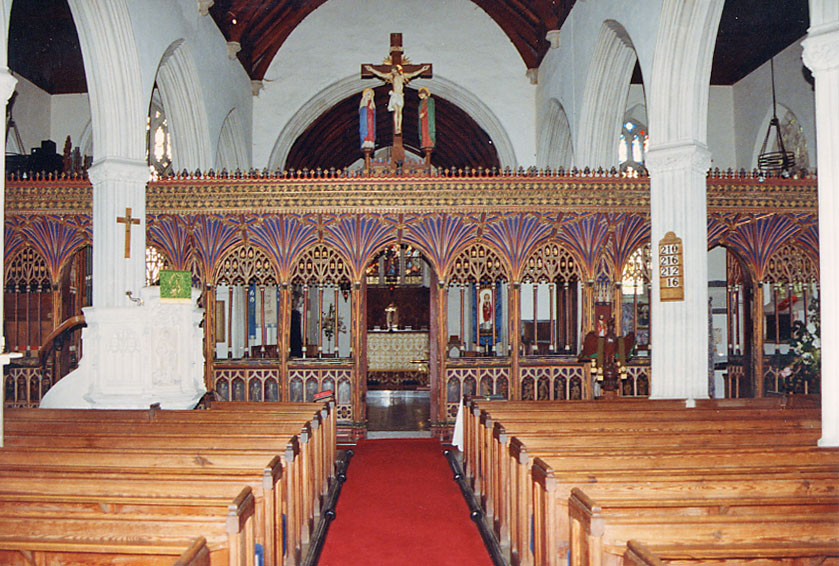
The church interior

=== St Disen's Church ===
The 15th-century church is dedicated to St Disen (a unique dedication in the British Isles) who is considered to have been an Irish missionary saint. Previously this church was dedicated to St Denis or St Dionysius. Some confusion has arisen with some believing the attribution to St Disen to have been a romantic invention of one of the 19th-century vicars of the parish, Rev. Mr. Croslegh. The church possesses a finely decorated screen; in the panels at the screen's base are nearly 50 paintings of saints and biblical scenes. Another screen in the church is simpler, with panels of various saints, including an unusual one of St Francis of Assisi receiving the stigmata.

=== Bradninch Manor House ===
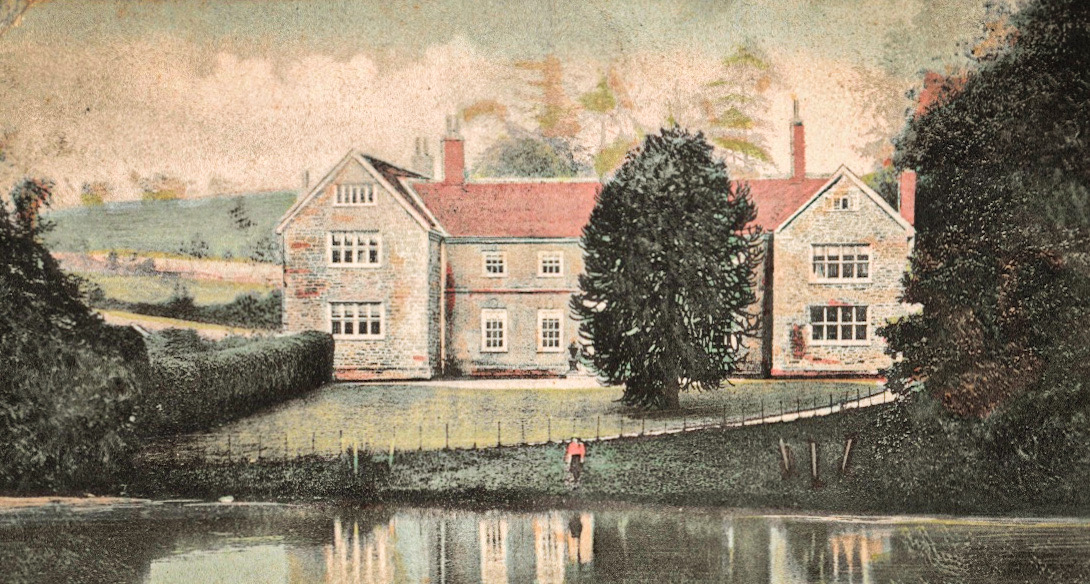
Bradninch Manor – Ancient seat of the Sainthill family

The surviving grade I listed manor house is situated on the north side of Parsonage Lane, to the immediate east of the town. It was built in 1553 by Peter Sainthill (c.1524-1571), MP, Recorder of Bradninch and Deputy Steward to the Duke of Cornwall of the manor of Bradninch. It was the scene of Peter's Banquet or The Cavalier in the Dumps, a Puritan satirical verse written circa 1645, describing a banquet held there during the Civil War for his soldiers by Captain Peter Sainthill (1593–1648), MP, grandson of the builder. One of the verses is as follows:

Peter, their Captain, for to try
If good King Charles they'd stand by,
Prepared a Banquet at his hall,
And there invited one and all
To eat, and drink, and for to sing
"God bless the cause! God bless the King!"

The present structure represents only half of the original "H-shaped" building. During World War II it served as a home for evacuees from Duchy-owned properties in London. Immediately after the War, in the late 1940s it served as a boarding school for very young children. Many of the original fittings of some of the 17th century rooms were removed illegally by the then owners in 1980, but the magnificently decorated Job Room survives in its original Jacobean form, and is comparable to a similar room with internal porch at nearby Bradfield House, Uffculme.

== Political representation ==
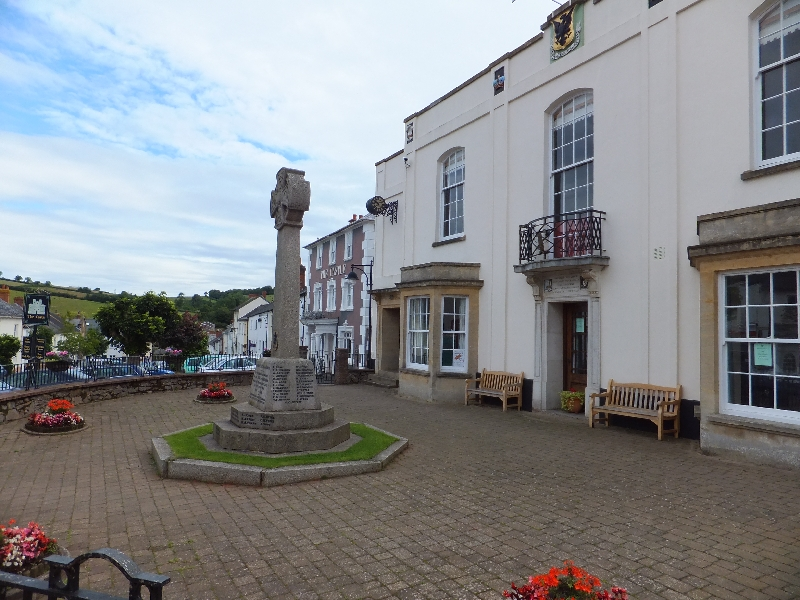
Bradninch Guildhall, with the eagle arms displayed, and war memorial.

The parish is divided between two wards, called Town and Rural, which respectively elect 11 and 1 councillors to the town council. Town ward includes Hele. The town council comprises all 12 parish councillors, one of which is elected by the council to be the town mayor, and there is also an appointed town clerk.

The entire parish of Bradninch lies within the Cullompton & Bradninch electoral division of Devon County Council.

Since its creation at the 2010 general election, Central Devon has returned a Conservative Member of Parliament, Mel Stride; Town ward falls within this constituency of Central Devon, whilst the Rural ward falls within the constituency of Honiton and Sidmouth.

== Population ==
The 2021 census recorded the population of the town settlement as 1,824. The census recorded the population of Town ward as 2,002 and the population of the parish as 2,165.

The 2012 population estimate for the parish was 2,222. The 2013 population estimate for the parish was 2,366. According to the Office for National Statistics Bradninch ward had a population of 1,775 in April 2001.

In 1887, according to John Bartholomew's Gazetteer of the British Isles, the population was 1,705.

In 1851 the population was 1,834.

== Transport ==
To the east of the town runs the Culm Valley, along which the M5 motorway and the Bristol–Exeter railway line pass. The town used to be served by the Hele & Bradninch railway station at Hele, located on that line, which is now closed. Today, the nearest railway stations – all approximately 9 miles distant – are Tiverton Parkway, which is on Great Western Railway's London Paddington to Penzance route, and Pinhoe, Cranbrook and Whimple, all of which are on South Western Railway's London Waterloo to Exeter St Davids route.

Stagecoach South West bus route 1 provides a regular public transport service to and through the town, and connects Bradninch with Exeter, Cullompton, Uffculme and Tiverton.

== Books about Bradninch ==
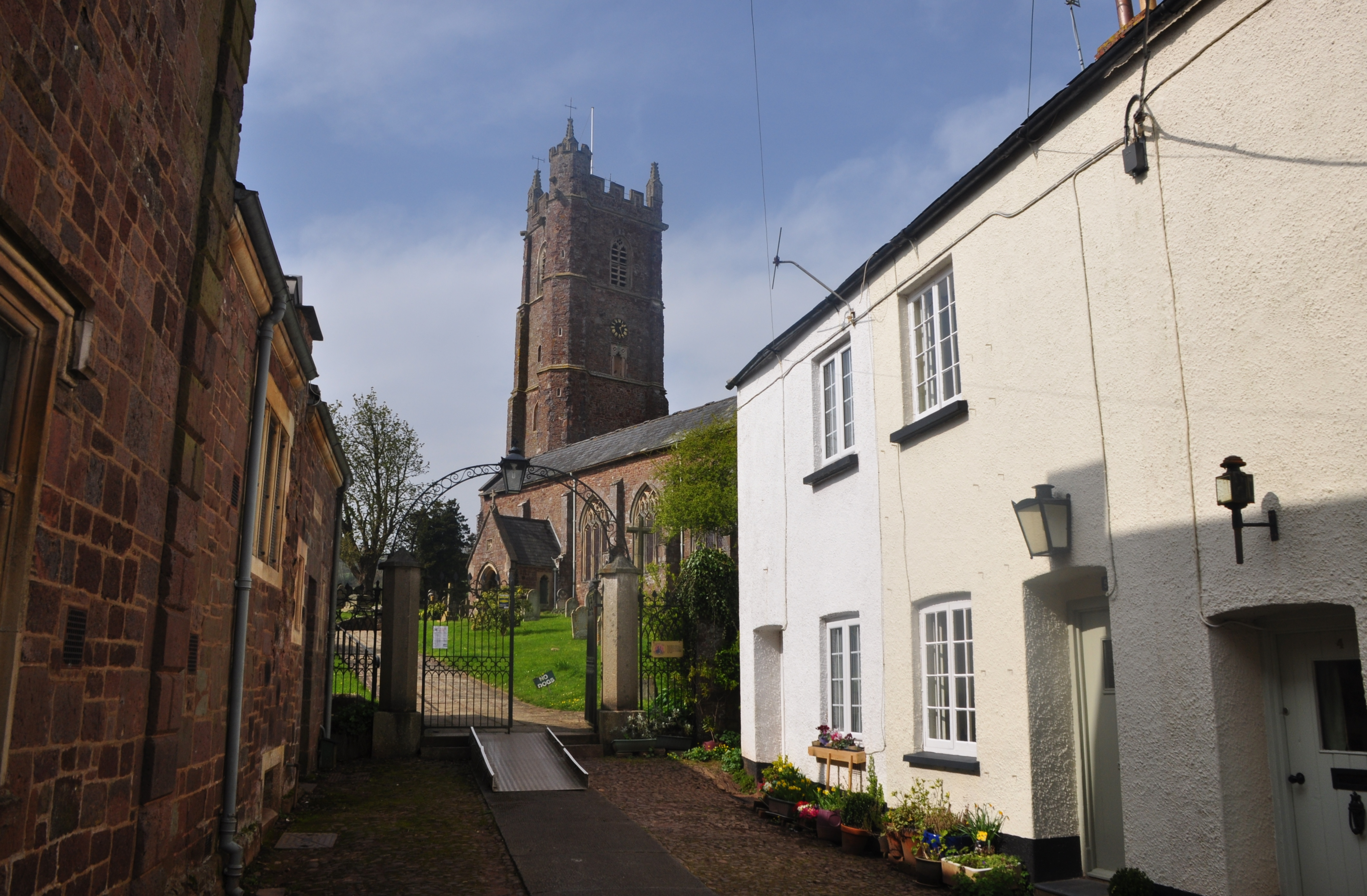
Church Street

The best known book about the town is by Charles Croslegh. He became vicar of Bradninch in 1897 and wrote a 360-page history of the town entitled "Bradninch, being a short historical sketch of the honor, the manor, the borough, and liberties, and the parish".

Other books have been written about the history of Bradninch and Hele by Anthony Taylor and by Paddy Nash.

== Royal connections ==
The Bradninch 'eagle' seal – an eagle displayed sable on a shield argent – was given to the burgesses of the town in about 1120 by the illegitimate son of Henry I, Arthur Reginald (Earl of Cornwall and Lord of Bradninch), when, by his letters patent, he incorporated the town and borough of Bradninch.

In 1337 King Edward III bestowed the first English dukedom on his eldest son, also called Edward (and later known as 'The Black Prince'), naming him the Duke of Cornwall. Since then, the Manor of Bradninch has been part of the Duchy of Cornwall. The Prince of Wales, Prince William, currently holds the title. Much of the farmland around the town still belongs to the duchy. In July 2016, Charles, at the time the Duke of Cornwall, visited Bradninch to inspect a new "affordable housing" development built in partnership by the Duchy and the Guinness Trust.

== Notoriety ==
Bradninch, although not the last, was one of the last towns in England to punish someone by placing them in stocks. On 2 November 1866 Cornelius Pippet, a cooper was convicted of drunkenness and placed in stocks for 6 hours. The stocks are part of the town's historical memorabilia kept in Bradninch Guildhall.

It was in Bradninch, in 1702, that George Boone III, grandfather of the American pioneer Daniel Boone, joined the Religious Society of Friends (Quakers). Daniel Boone's father, Squire Boone (1696–1765), emigrated to colonial Pennsylvania from Bradninch sometime around 1712.
