= Sampford Peverell =

Village in Devon, England

Coordinates: 50.920°N 3.383°W

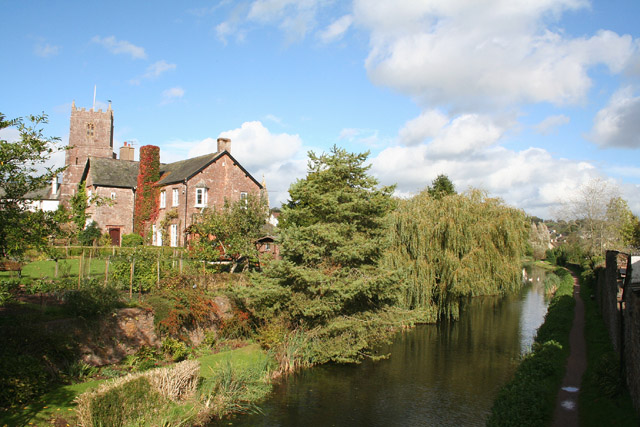
The Grand Western Canal and St John's church (the house in front of the church is one of the rectories built at the expense of the canal company)

Arms of Peverell of Sampford Peverell, Devon: Azure, three garbs argent a chief or

Sampford Peverell is a village and civil parish in Mid-Devon, England. Grid Reference ST030143.

An old Saxon settlement, it was called Sanforda in the 1086 Domesday Book. Its current name reflects its inclusion in the Honour of Peverel, the lands of William Peverel and his family. His great-grandson, Hugh Peverell (the name had changed spelling), is buried in the village church of St John the Baptist. The Grand Western Canal cuts through the village.

The parish is surrounded, clockwise from the north, by the parishes of Hockworthy, Holcombe Rogus, Burlescombe, Halberton and Uplowman. The village itself has parts called Higher Town and Lower Town.

The New Rectory was built in 1836, at the expense of the Grand Western Canal Company, in compensation for cutting through the grounds and demolishing the south wing of the Old Rectory which had been built for the use of Margaret Beaufort, mother of Henry VII.

The Great Western Railway opened a station at Sampford Peverell in 1932 but it closed on 5 October 1964; the site has since been reused as Tiverton Parkway railway station (opened in 1986). Today, National Cycle Route 3 passes through the village.

The parish historically formed part of the hundred of Halberton.

== Poltergeist hoax ==
In 1810 it was reported that the house of a John Chave in the village was experiencing dramatic poltergeist activity. The case was discussed in the national press of the time, and Chave's house gained such notoriety that in 1811 it was besieged by a mob of rowdy workmen known as navvies. In the scenes that followed, Chave was forced to open fire on the crowd in self-defence, killing one person, a George Helps, buried in the churchyard. The paranormal activity turned out to be noises made by smugglers behind a false wall. The house in question no longer stands, but its location can be pinpointed courtesy of a village information board that denominates it 'The Ghost House, Higher Town - now demolished'.
