= Willand =

Village in Mid Devon, England

Coordinates: 50°53′N 3°22′W

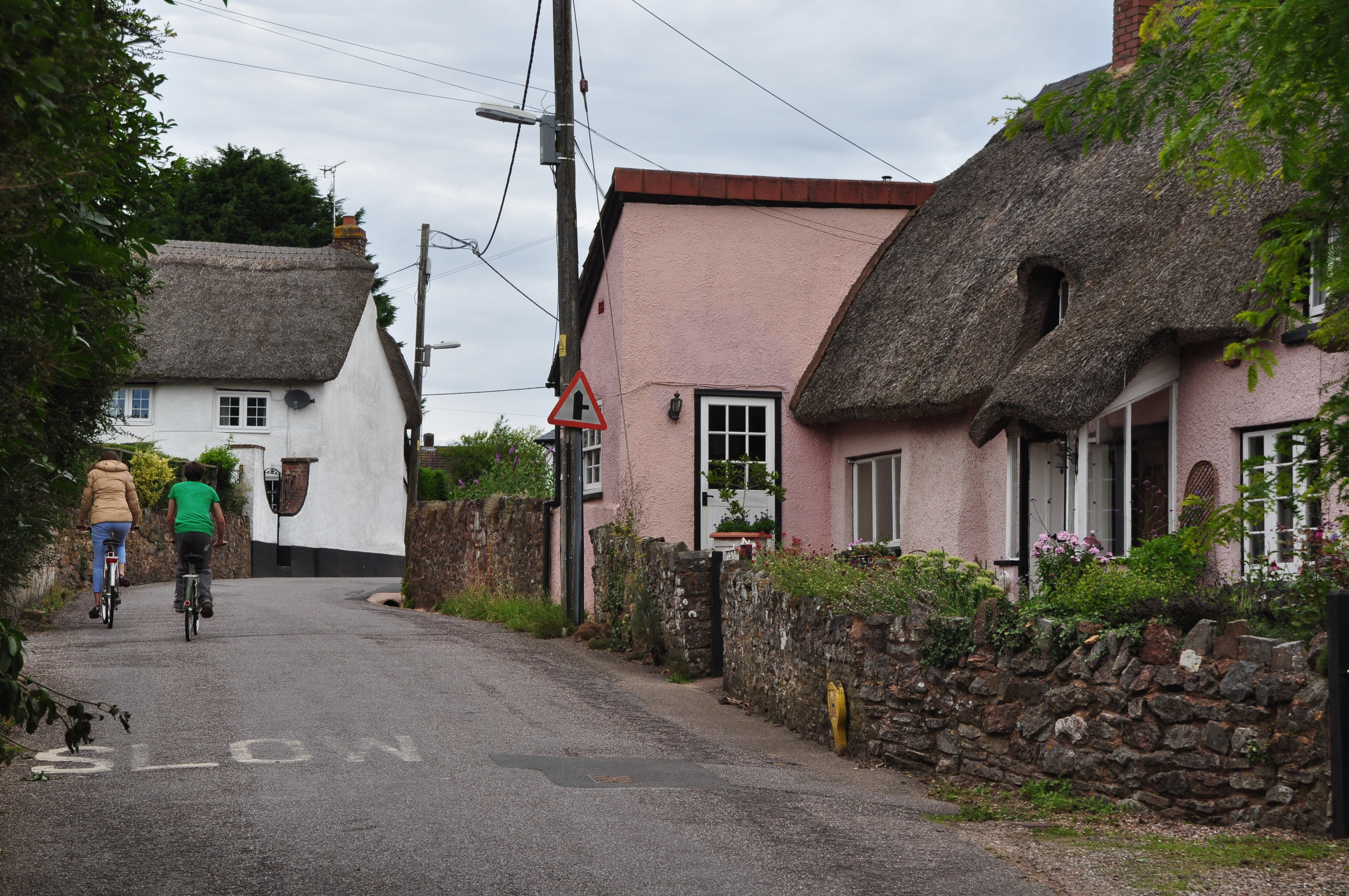
Willand Old Village

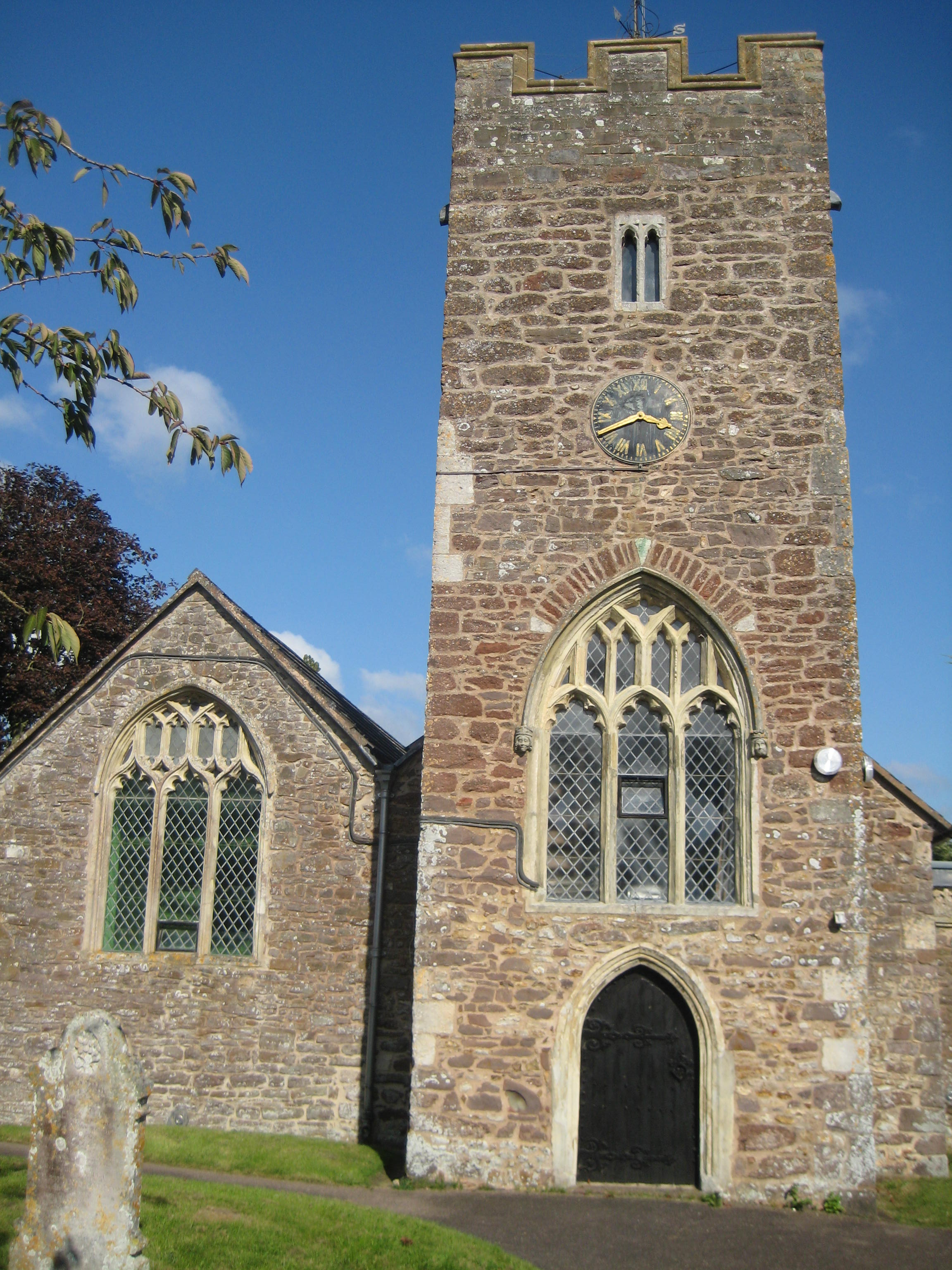
The church of St Mary

Willand is a village and civil parish in Mid Devon, England. It is about 19 km (12 mi) north of Exeter and 2.4 km (1.5 mi) north of Cullompton. In 1991 the population was 3750 although recently this has grown considerably. The National Grid reference for the centre of the area is ST037110. Willand is a major part of Lower Culm electoral ward. The ward population at the 2011 Census was 5,808. The parish is surrounded, clockwise from the north, by the parishes of Halberton, Uffculme and Cullompton.

Willand has probably had a settlement since the Iron Age but is first recorded in 1042 as having "belonged to Ethmar". It historically formed part of the hundred of Halberton.

The church of St Mary the Virgin is medieval; it has a small tower and a chancel, nave and north aisle. The south porch has some decoration and there is a late medieval rood screen (probably c. 1400 in date and fairly simple in design).

There is one pub, The Halfway House, and a country manor, situated next to Diggerland, called the Verbeer Manor. It has one primary school, Willand School, that has around 300 pupils. From Willand, pupils go to Cullompton Community College, Uffculme School, or to other secondary schools in the area.

Willand has a football club, Willand Rovers F.C., who play at the Stan Robinson Stadium on Silver Street.

Willand also has a village hall, where a number of social activities take place, such as short mat bowls and coffee mornings. Alongside the village hall is Willand Tennis Club.

The Bristol to Exeter railway line was completed in 1844, and a station, Tiverton Road, was opened in Willand to serve the nearby town of Tiverton; this was renamed Tiverton Junction railway station when a branch line reached the town, and also became the junction for the Culm Valley Light Railway in 1876. Both branch lines had closed by 1975, and the station closed in 1986 when Tiverton Parkway was opened.

The M5 motorway skirts the village to the west, just east of the railway line. It features on the crest of Willand Rovers F.C. The nearest M5 junctions are J28 at Cullompton and J27 at Tiverton Parkway.

Adjacent to the railway line there is a large poultry processing factory, part of the 2 Sisters Food Group, who purchased it from Lloyd Maunder in 2008.

== Geology ==
A survey carried out in 2015–17 found that the location was subject to an annual uplift of 2 cm, the cause of which is unknown.
