= Halberton =

Village in Devon, England

Coordinates: 50.9025°N 3.4875°W

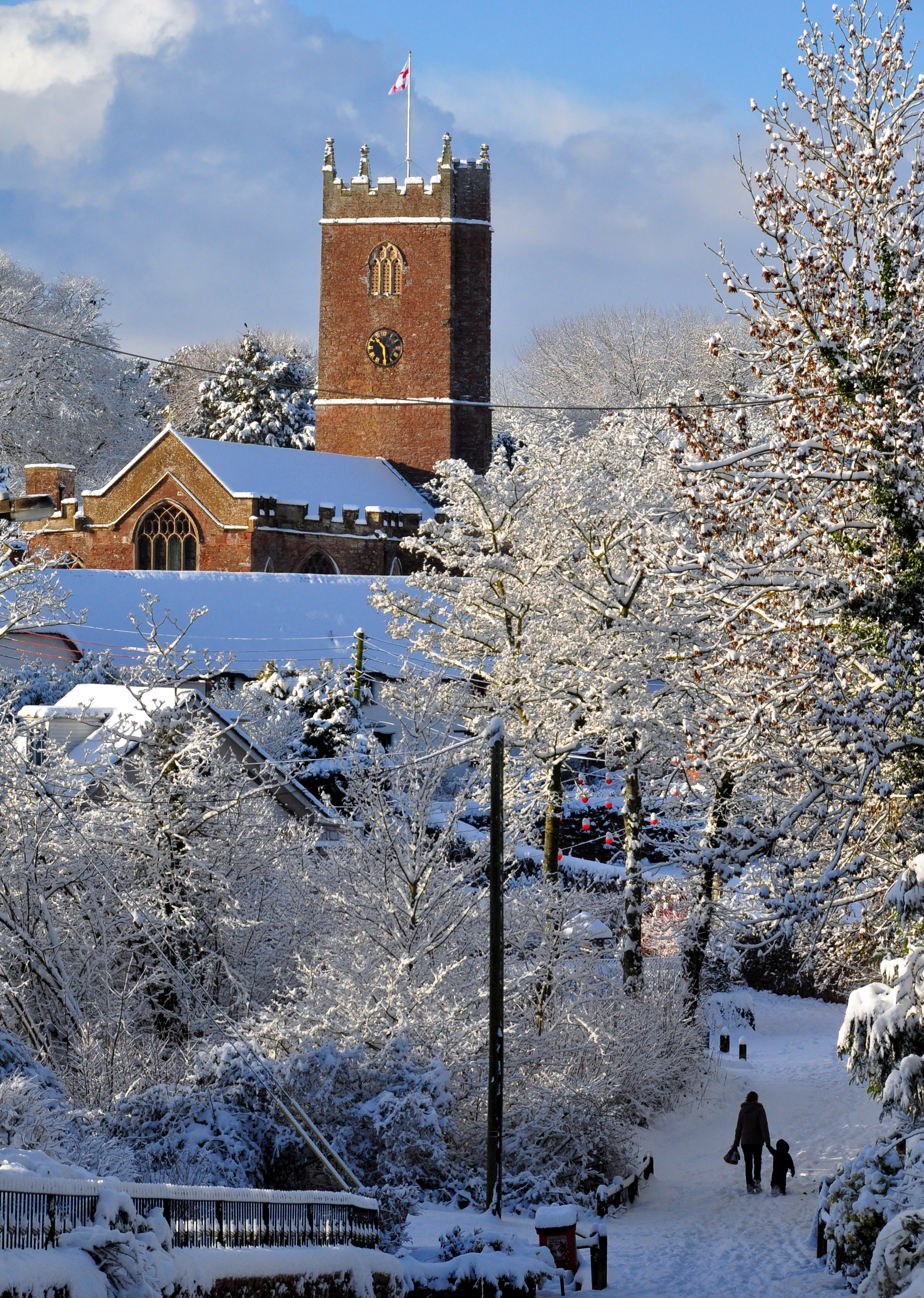
- The parish church, St Andrew's

- Location within Devon
- Population: 1,971 (2021 census)
- OS grid reference: SS955125
- Civil parish: Halberton
- District: Mid Devon
- Shire county: Devon
- Region: South West
- Country: England
- Sovereign state: United Kingdom
- Post town: Tiverton
- Postcode district: EX16
- Dialling code: 01884
- Police: Devon and Cornwall
- Fire: Devon and Somerset
- Ambulance: South Western
- UK Parliament: Tiverton and Minehead

Halberton is a village and civil parish in Devon, England. It is situated between the historic market towns of Tiverton and Cullompton. The Grand Western Canal runs around to the north and west of the village.

The large parish has an area of about 7,520 acres (30.4 km^{2}) and it is surrounded, clockwise from the north, by the parishes of Uplowman, Sampford Peverell, Burlescombe, Uffculme, Willand, Cullompton, Butterleigh, Silverton, Bickleigh and Tiverton. The parish includes the small village of Ash Thomas as well as the hamlet of Brithem Bottom. The population of the parish at the 2021 census was 1,971, whilst the population of the village itself was recorded by that census as 892. Changes to the parish boundary, involving transfers of residential and industrial areas to Uffculme and Willand respectively, occurred in 2023.

== History ==
Its name is derived from ‘Haligbeort’ (Albert), the name of the Saxon chief, and ‘tun’, a farm settlement; the Halberton area is still largely a farming community. Halberton was once important enough to be a hundred, a long-standing administrative division of the county. The hundred of Halberton included the parishes of Halberton, Sampford Peverell and Willand, as well as parts of Uplowman and Burlescombe. Many of the farms date back to the time of Domesday Book or shortly after.

In 2026, archaeologists excavating a Roman villa complex on farmland between Halberton and Sampford Peverell uncovered a 12-square-metre (130 sq ft) polychrome mosaic, probably installed during the fourth century, and a detached bathhouse with at least two plunge pools and painted plaster walls. The excavation forms part of the five-year SHARE project, established to record the villa complex before it is further damaged by ploughing.

== Geography ==
There is an electoral ward with the same name, which comprises the parishes of Halberton and Butterleigh. The current ward came into effect in May 2023 – previously, the ward comprised Halberton and Uplowman. The population of the Halberton ward (including Uplowman) at the 2021 census was 2,330.

Halberton village is informally divided into two parts – Higher Town and Lower Town – which are separated by the mill stream and pond.

National Cycle Route 3 passes through the village.

== Features ==
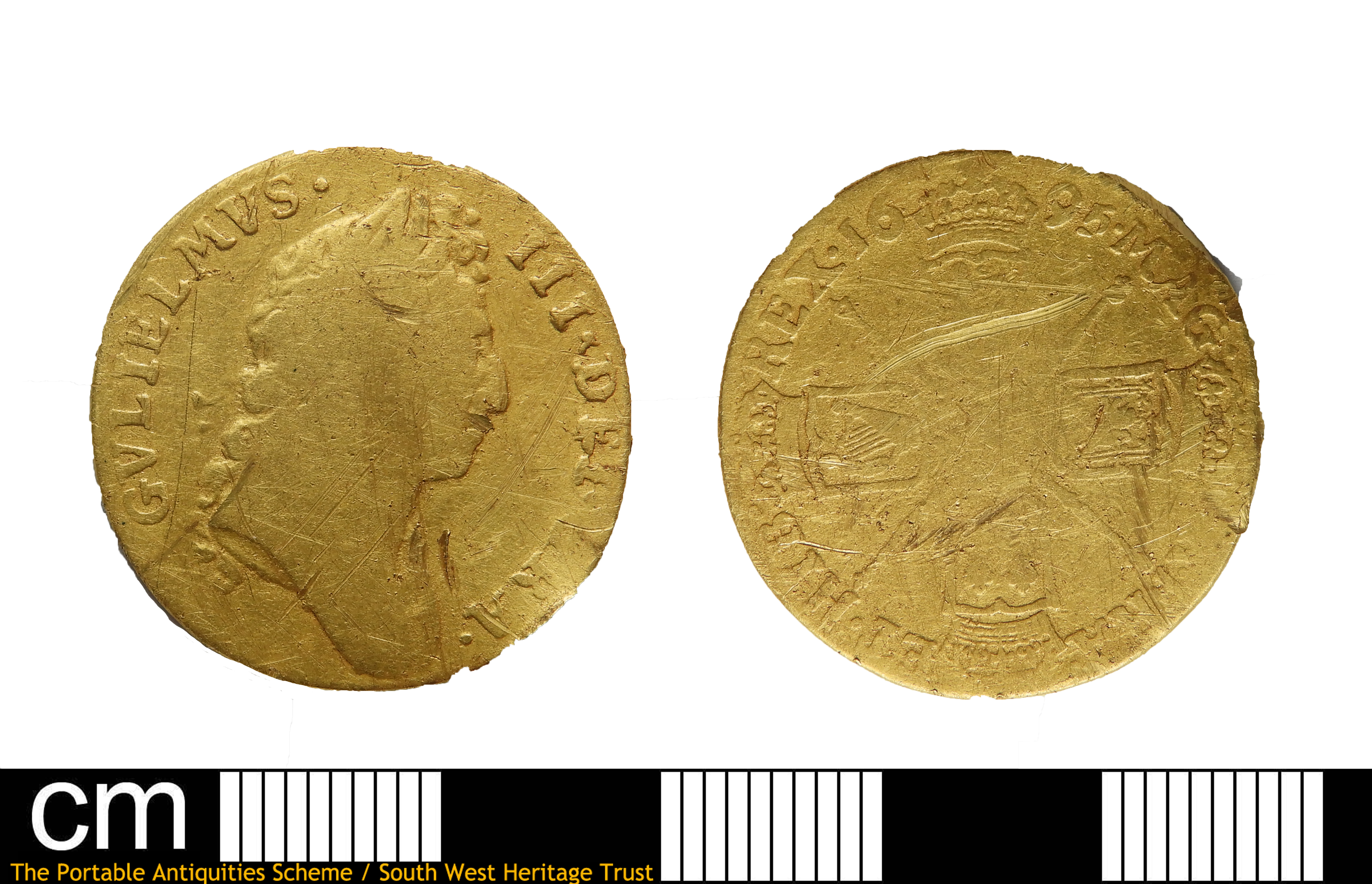
A gold guinea of William III, dating from 1695, found in Halberton in 2019

There are several old houses in the village, the most notable being ‘The Priory’, believed to date from the 14th century, when it was part of a college called St. Jude's. This was occupied by monks of the order of St. Augustine. The building known to be the oldest is the Mill House, which was registered in Domesday Book as town mills. Townsend House (now demolished) dated from the early 18th century, and several other houses in the village date from the 17th and 18th centuries.

The parish church, dedicated to Saint Andrew, is grade I listed and dates from the 14th century. It stands at the centre of the village, and is thought to have been constructed on the site of an earlier Saxon church. There is also a Methodist Chapel at which John Wesley preached, first in 1760, and again between 1779 and 1789. Halberton also has a Christian Fellowship Group, which meets in Ash Thomas Church.

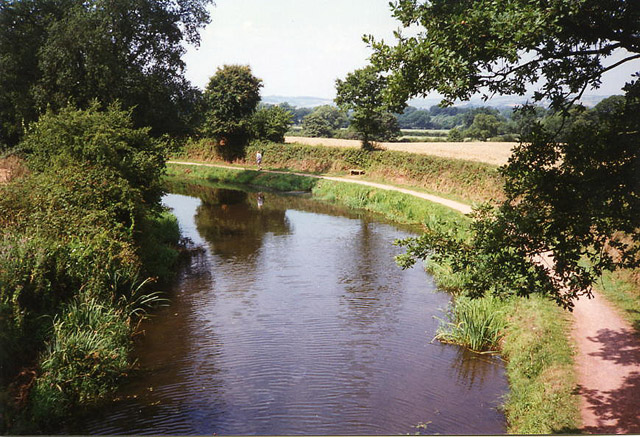
Grand Western Canal at Halberton, seen from Manley Bridge, looking towards Tiverton.

The Great Western Railway once had a branch line running through Halberton to Tiverton, with a halt at Lower Town, but both the line and the station have now gone. However, the Grand Western Canal still runs through the parish and, although navigable, this is now a country park. It is 11 miles (18 km) long, running from Tiverton to Loudwells. Rock Bridge was constructed to carry the road (formerly the A373) over the canal. The same engineers that built the canal also built a substantial country house, turnpike house and cottages at the site. Several other bridges were also constructed at Halberton to carry minor roads over the canal.

== Community ==
The Primary School, erected in 1844 and now grade II listed, has seen many changes and extensions over the years, and although still small is well equipped with modern equipment.

There is an active parish council, and many other organisations which cater for all tastes, including a Women's Institute and a branch of the British Legion. There is a public house in the village, called the Hickory Inn, formerly The Barge.
