= Halberton Hundred =

Ancient administrative unit of Devon, England

The hundred of Halberton was the name of a small district, one of thirty two ancient administrative units of Devon, England.

The parishes in the hundred were:

- Burlescombe (part)
- Halberton
- Sampford Peverell
- Uplowman (part)
- Willand

== See also ==
- List of hundreds of England and Wales - Devon
