= Burlescombe =

Village in Devon, England

Coordinates: 50°56′41″N 3°19′22″W

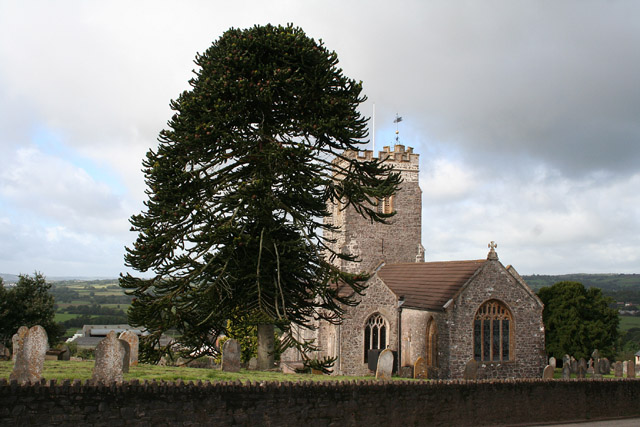
- St Mary's Church

- Location within Devon
- Population: 911 (2001)
- OS grid reference: ST0716
- Civil parish: Burlescombe
- District: Mid Devon
- Shire county: Devon
- Region: South West
- Country: England
- Sovereign state: United Kingdom
- Post town: TIVERTON
- Postcode district: EX16
- Dialling code: 01823
- Police: Devon and Cornwall
- Fire: Devon and Somerset
- Ambulance: South Western
- UK Parliament: Tiverton and Minehead

Burlescombe (/bərˈlɛskəm/, bur-LES-kəm) is a village and civil parish in the Mid Devon district of Devon, England. The parish is surrounded, clockwise from the north, by the parishes of Holcombe Rogus, Culmstock, Uffculme, Halberton and Sampford Peverell. According to the 2001 census it had a population of 911. The village is about 5 miles (8.0 km) south west of Wellington in Somerset. The ruins of the 12th century Canonsleigh Abbey are nearby. Burlescombe is part of the electoral ward of Canonsleigh. The population of this ward was 3,218 at the 2011 Census.

== History ==
The parish was formerly divided into four tithings and hamlets: the Town Tithing, Appledore, Westleigh and Ayshford. In 1872 the lord of the manor was Edward Ayshford Sandford, Esq., in which year much of the parish belonged to the heirs of Sir William Follett, namely R. H. Clarke Esq, Henry Dunsford Esq., and other freeholders

As part of the construction of the Grand Western Canal in about 1810, several bridges and culverts were constructed at Burlescombe. Limestone of superior quality abounded in the locality and in the 19th century great quantities of it were sent off by canal and railway.

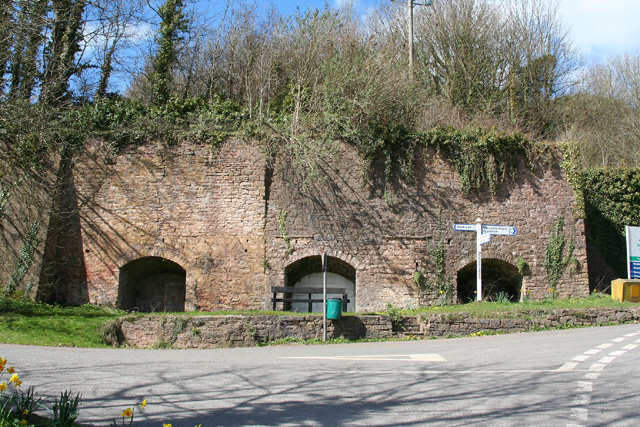
Ruins of a limekiln at Westleigh Quarry, Burlescombe

Burlescombe railway station was opened by the Bristol and Exeter Railway in 1867. A siding on the west side served the railway's nearby ballast quarry at Westleigh. Both the station and siding are now closed. The parish includes Tiverton Parkway railway station, which was opened in 1986.

In 1872 the parish was entitled to send a boy to nearby Uffculme Free School, founded in 1701 by Nicholas Ayshford who endowed it with £47 per annum. Today the trustees of the Ayshford Educational Foundation (Registered Number 306659) award grants to students aged over 18 in further and higher education who are residents of the parishes of Burlescombe, Holcombe Rogus or Uffculme.

== Parish church ==
The parish church dedicated to St Mary is chiefly of the time of Henry VII (1485–1509) and was renovated in 1843. It contains a beautiful ancient rood-screen, and fine monuments of the Ayshford family. The parish church was renovated in 1843 when new carved oak pews and stained glass windows were added and the heraldic blazonry on the screen was re-painted.

=== Monument to Roger Ayshford (d.1610) ===
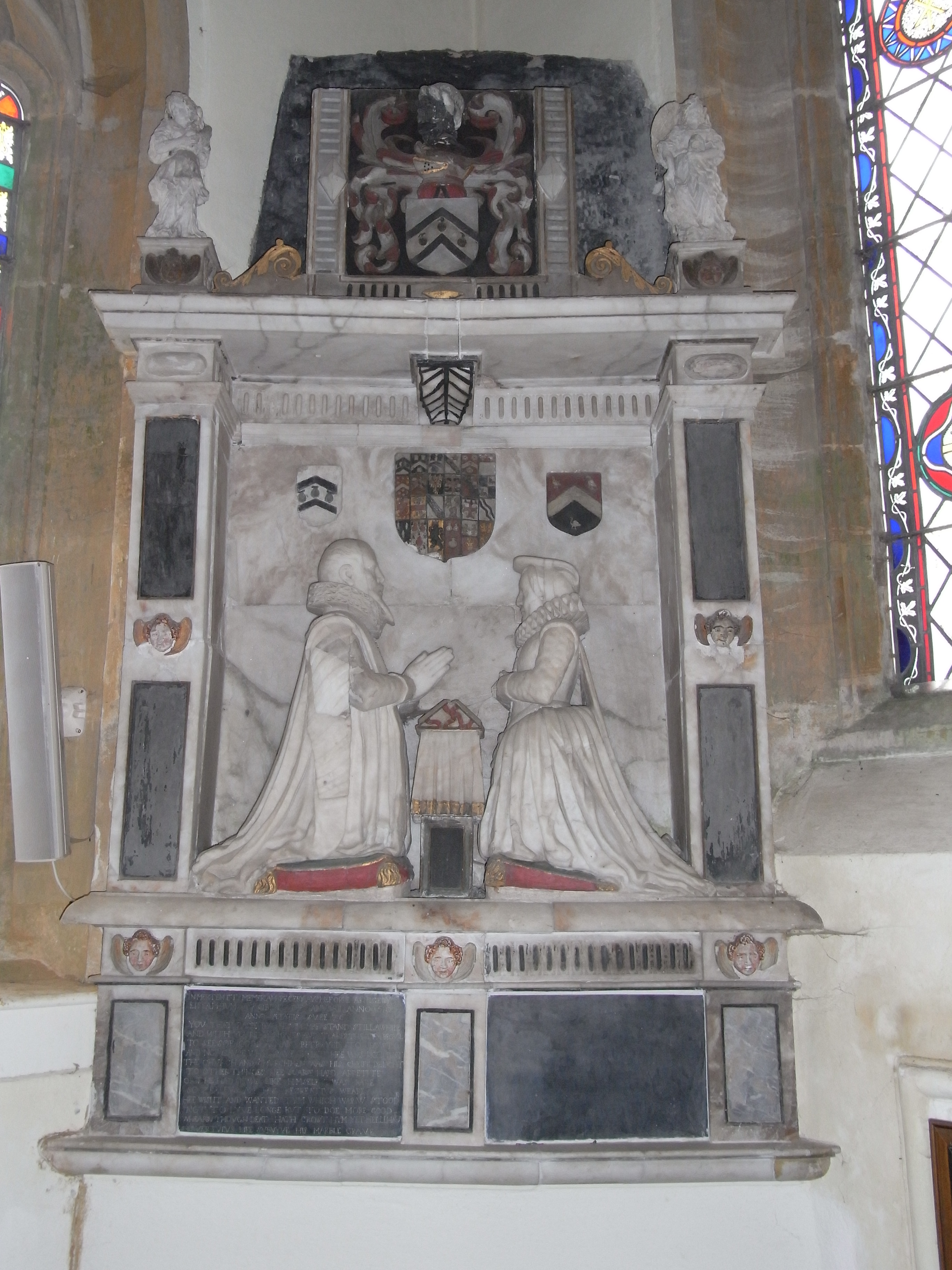
Mural monument to Roger Ayshford (d.1610)

In the church there is a mural monument to Roger Ayshford (d.1610). It bears the inscription: "In mortem et memoriam Regery Aysheforde armigery epitaphium obiit ... die Januarii anno 1610 anno aetatis suee 76 (An epitaph in death and memory of Roger Ayshford Esq. who died the ... day of January 1610 in the 76th year of his age) You that passe by this tombe stand still awhile; and with youre tongues and teares the tym begueil; to see soe good a man betr(ayed?) to dust; and not cause why save that hee was rightjust; the Church and churchmen was his cheife delight; to other thinges hee scarse hadd appetite; or if he had twas like himself twas rare; so zeallus all his recreativs weare; hee wisht and wanted tym which was wi(th?)stoode; not to lyve longe but to doe more good; whearin though death hath crost hym yet heell have; his vertueus life survyve his marble grave".

Sculpted opposite Roger is his wife Elizabeth Michell, daughter of Richard Michell (1524–1563) of Perry Court, in Wembdon parish, near Cannington, Somerset. Richard died at the Middle Temple, London, suggesting him to have been a lawyer; his heir was his son Tristram. His father was Sir Thomas Michell KB(1514–1539) who on 13 December 1539 at his home called Gurney Street (or Gurney Manor), Cannington, murdered his wife and her sister Eleanor, wife of George Sydenham of Chilworthy, near Ilminster, before committing suicide. Above her head are shown the arms of Michell: Per chevron gules and sable, a chevron between three swans argent The Michell family were lords of the manor of Wembdon.

=== Monument to Elizabeth Ayshford (d.1635) ===
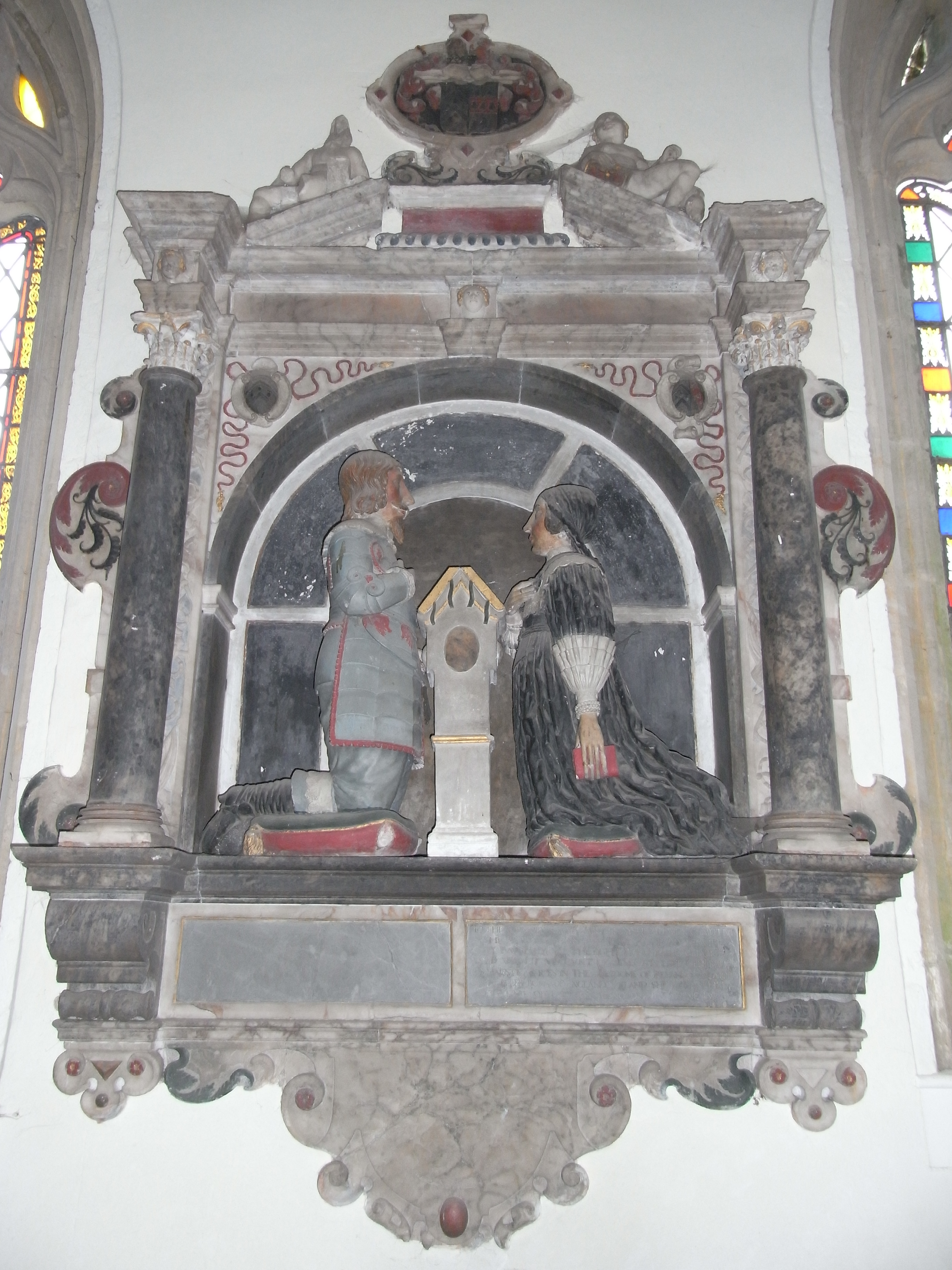
Ayshford mural monument to Elizabeth Wilmot (d.1635)

There is a mural monument to Elizabeth Wilmot (d.1635) Burlescombe Church. Text incised on slate tablet on monument: "To the memory of Elizabeth Ayshford wife of Arthur Ayshford eldest sonne of Henry Ayshford Esquier only daughter of the right honourable Charles Lord Wilmot Viscount of Atllone (i.e. Athlone, d.1644) late general of his majesties forces in the kingdome of Ireland now a privy counceller both of England Ireland. She dyed the 23th (sic) yeare of her age Anno D(omi)ni 1635 June 13.o"

== Ayshford Court ==
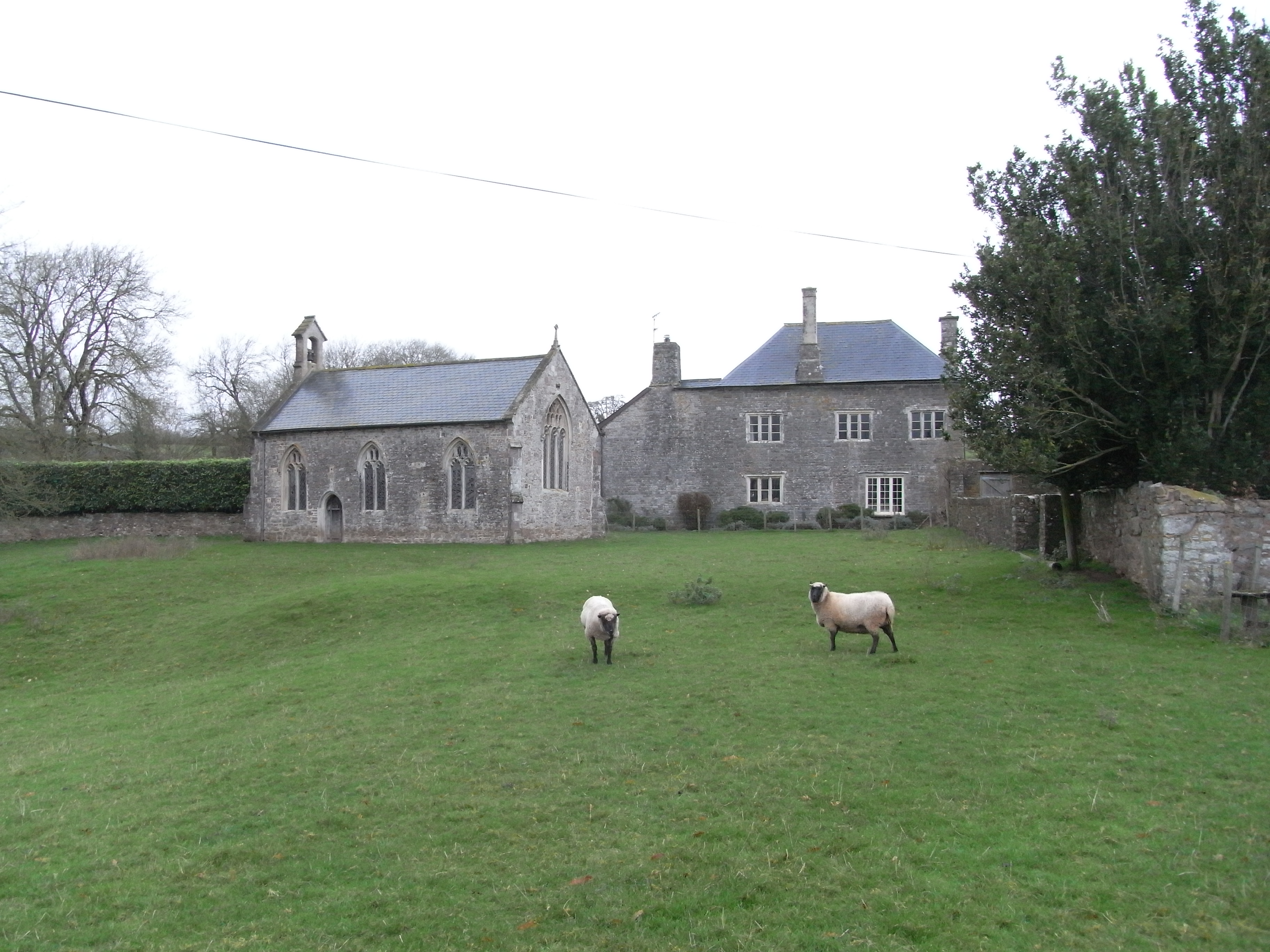
Ayshford Chapel and Ayshford Court, viewed from the south, from the bank of the canal

Ayshford is recorded in the Domesday Book of 1086 as Aiseforda. It is recorded even earlier in a charter dated 958. The manor house is now split into two residences. The main historic house was built by the Ashford/Ayshford family in about 1500 with major additions in the 16th and 17th centuries. The parlour wing was probably built by Roger Ayshford (d.1610) and the plasterwork was probably commissioned by Arthur Ayshford. The owners at the time of the listing of the building in 1966 possessed a transcript of a 1689 inventory which showed the great wealth of the Ayshford family at that time. Mention was made of a "painted chamber". Ayshford Court, with its chapel and farmbuildings form an attractive group of buildings.

== Ayshford Chapel of Ease ==
On the former manor of the Ayshford family, next to the manor house which survives, stands a 15th-century chapel of ease. It consists of a rectangular aisle-less block containing a nave and chancel. It is considered to be large for a private chapel in Devon. The wagon-roof and carved oak chancel screen are 15th-century. The screen was re-painted in the 19th century, to which period the furniture, consisting of utilitarian oak pews and the black and red glazed floor tiles, also belongs. It contains several monuments to the Ayshford family.

== Digital Media ==
A 360° digital view of the Church of St Mary the Virgin is available online, showing both the interior and the surrounding churchyard. The resource provides panoramic images of the rood-screen, Ayshford family monuments, and burial ground in their present state, and illustrates the layout of the church within its landscape.

The Historic England listing for the Church of St Mary the Virgin (List Entry Number 1106465) includes a link to the Missing Pieces Project. This initiative invites members of the public to contribute photographs, videos, or written accounts relating to listed heritage sites, in order to enrich and expand the official record. Contributions for the Church of St Mary the Virgin can be added via the "Comments and Photos" section of the list entry page, subject to moderation.

The Burlescombe tithe map and apportionment, viewable through the Devon Historic Environment Service, include the Church of St Mary the Virgin within the nineteenth-century parish landscape. The map records land plots, ownership, and cultivation at the time of survey. The original tithe map is held at the Devon Heritage Centre.
