= Bradninch Guildhall =

Municipal building in Bradninch, Devon, England

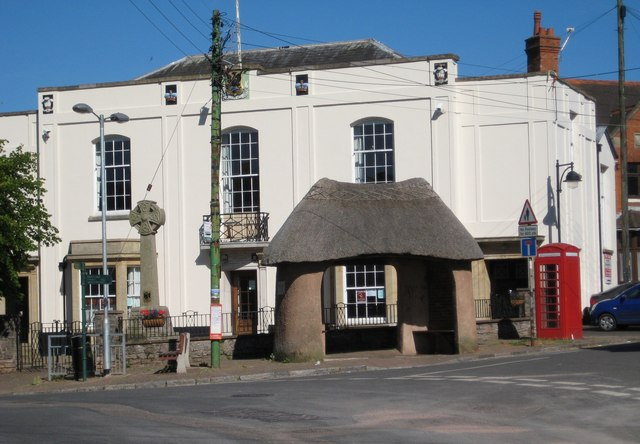
- Bradninch Guildhall

- Shown in Devon
- 50.8268°N 3.4216°W
- Location: Fore Street, Bradninch

History
- Built: 1835

Site notes
- Architectural style: Neoclassical style

Listed Building – Grade II
- Official name: The Guildhall
- Designated: 24 October 1951
- Reference no.: 1326117

Bradninch Guildhall is a municipal building in Fore Street, Bradninch, Devon, England. The structure, which is now used as a community events venue, is a Grade II listed building.

== History ==
The first municipal building in Bradninch was an ancient guildhall, which was erected in the 12th century, rebuilt in the 15th century, and then re-built again after a fire in 1666. The western part of the building accommodated the Green Dragon Public House while the eastern part of the building accommodated a local lock-up on the ground floor and a meeting room for the borough council on the first floor. The whole complex was destroyed in another fire in 1832.

The current building was designed in the neoclassical style, built in stone with a roughcast finish and was completed in 1835. The original design involved a symmetrical main frontage of three bays facing onto Fore Street. The central bay featured a round headed doorway flanked by two segmental headed windows; the first floor was also fenestrated by segmental headed windows. At roof level, there was a parapet, which was decorated by heraldic devices, including a spread eagle in the central position. Internally, the principal rooms were a lock-up on the ground floor, the use of which was discontinued in 1865, and an assembly room on the first floor.

A Russian cannon, which had been captured at the Siege of Sevastopol and presented by the Prince of Wales, was mounted on a gun carriage, which was presented by Prince Albert, and was installed in front of the guildhall after the Crimean War. The borough council, which had met in the guildhall, was abolished under the Municipal Corporations Act 1883. The assets of the borough council, including the guildhall, were transferred to the newly created Bradninch Town Trust in 1889, and the building subsequently served as a venue for concerts and other community events.

A war memorial, in the form of a celtic cross on a stone shaft, which was intended to commemorate the lives of local service personnel who had died in the First World War, was unveiled outside the guildhall by Brigadier-General Edward Algernon D'Arcy Thomas on 22 February 1920. The building was extensively remodelled in 1921: slightly recessed additional bays containing doorways, leading to new stairwells, were added at either end; a new square headed doorway with an architrave, flanked by brackets supporting a balcony, was installed in the central bay; and new bay windows were added in the flanking bays.

Following local government re-organisation in 1974, the assembly hall became the meeting place of Bradninch Town Council. A major programme of works, to convert various rooms on the ground floor into a single reception room, was completed in 1989, and Mid Devon Council gave planning consent for a two-storey extension at the rear of the building in August 2022.
