= Peter Sainthill (MP for Tiverton) =

English politician (1593–1648)

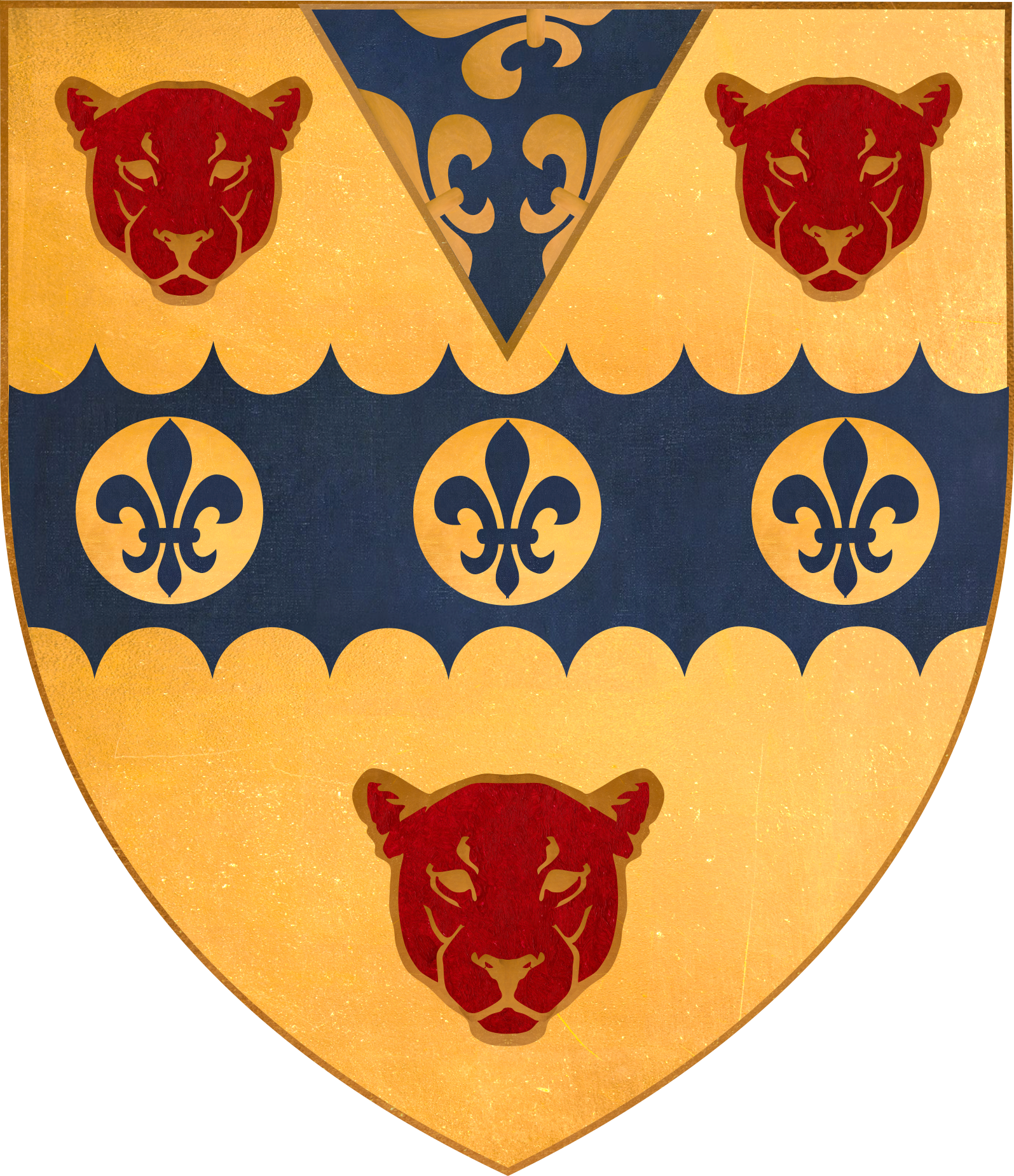
Arms of Sainthill: Or, on a fess engrailed azure between three leopard's faces gules three bezants each charged with a fleur-de-lys of the second on a pile in chief of the second three demi-fleurs-de-lys attached to the top and sides of the first. These arms were granted in 1546 by Sir Christopher Barker, Garter King of Arms, to Peter I Sainthill (c.1524-1571) of Bradninch.

Peter Sainthill (8 July 1593 – 12 August 1648) was an English politician who was twice elected a Member of Parliament for Tiverton in Devon, in the Short Parliament 1640 and in the Long Parliament in November 1640. He was a strong supporter of the Royalist side in the Civil War. He was the subject of a lengthy Puritan verse satire, known as Peter's Banquet or The Cavalier in the Dumps, written circa 1645.

== Origins ==
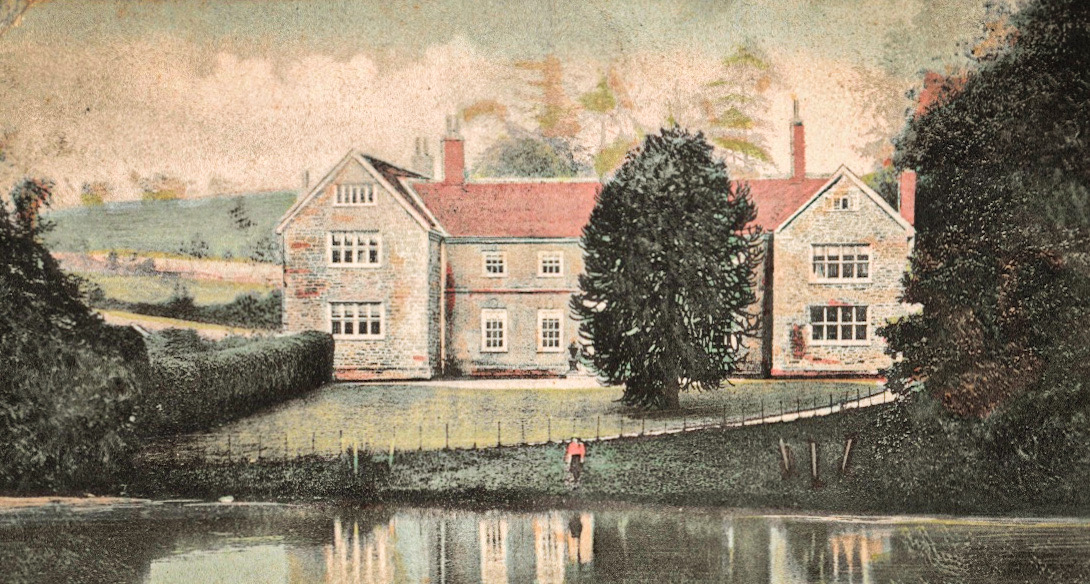
Bradninch Manor - Seat of the Sainthill family from 1553

Sainthill was born on 8 July 1593 at Bradninch, the son of Peter II Sainthill (eldest son and heir of Peter I Sainthill of Bradninch, MP) with his wife Elizabeth Martin, a daughter of Thomas Martin of Steeple Morden in Cambridgeshire, Doctor of Civil Law and Member of Parliament. The Sainthill family originated at the manor of Saint Hill, Devon, six miles north-east of Bradninch.

== Career ==
He was educated at the Free Grammar School (now Blundell's School) at Tiverton, Devon, six miles south-east of Bradninch, founded by the will of the wealthy clothier Peter Blundell. As one of the earliest pupils of that school his biography is included in the Worthies of Blundell's by M.L. Banks (1904), where he was described as "a man of culture and unaffected simplicity of character, (who) represents the Cavalier cause at its best". He served in the honourable office of Recorder of Bradninch, an ancient borough the manor of which was caput of the feudal barony of Bradninch long held by the Dukes of Cornwall, eldest sons and heirs apparent to the ruling monarch.

=== Civil War ===
In April 1640 Sainthill was elected a Member of Parliament for Tiverton in the Short Parliament. He was re-elected in November 1640 for the Long Parliament but supported the king and was thus disabled from sitting in January 1644. At the start of the Civil War he was one of the 118 Members of Parliament who sat in the Parliament of Oxford, convened by the king in January 1643, and was one of the signatories of the letter to the Earl of Essex on 27 January 1643. In consequence, the Parliament in their propositions for Peace addressed to the king on 23 November 1644, required that Peter Sainthill, (among others) be removed from Court, and from the King's Councils, be rendered incapable of ever holding office, and that a third of the value of his estates be employed for the payment of the public debt.

Sainthill was Captain of his local Trained Band raised in and around Bradninch, one of many raised by the king's Commissioners of Array in Devonshire.

In the early summer 1644 the king was in Devonshire, and marched from Plymouth north-eastwards towards Tiverton, himself attended only by his own troop, having ordered the principal officers of the court to go to Exeter in the east, with the royal army to follow him by slow marches, and to be quartered at Tiverton and other towns adjacent. The king arrived at Bradninch, where he was a guest of Sainthill at Bradninch House for one day and night on 27 July 1644. It was on this occasion that Sainthill is supposed to have loaned the king money for the war effort, and that in acknowledgement of such the king inscribed his initials on a wooden door in the house. The royal army duly arrived in the area in September and was quartered in and around Bradninch on 17 September 1644.

Sainthill was appointed as one of the "Commissioners for managing the King's affairs in the West", and is mentioned by Clarendon in his History of the Rebellion as one of the Commissioners who met the Prince of Wales at Bridgwater in Somerset on 23 April 1645, "to consult on the best steps to be taken for the King's service".

=== Exile in Italy and death ===
Following the downturn in the fortunes of the Royalists, Sainthill fled the Parliamentarian army, which led by General Fairfax had set up quarters at Bradninch on 16 October 1645. In the early autumn of 1645 Sainthill sought refuge with his wife and children in the walled City of Exeter, nine miles south-west of Bradninch. Following the surrender of Exeter to the Parliamentarian forces on 9 April 1646, he received a pass from Fairfax, which allowed him to leave with "freedom from molestation for himself, with his servants, horses, arms, and necessaries", and he set off for exile in Italy. In early in May 1646 he arrived in Leghorn in Tuscany to stay with his younger brother Robert Sainthill (d.post-1665) a merchant, who was agent for Ferdinando II de Medici, Grand Duke of Tuscany. However, shortly after his arrival he died from an illness on 12 August 1648, aged 54.

== Satirical Puritan verse ==
(See full text on Wikisource s:Peter's Banquet, or, The Cavalier in the Dumps)

He was the subject of a lengthy verse satire written by the Republican or Roundhead faction, "very curious as a specimen of party spirit during the Civil War", known as Peter's Banquet or The Cavalier in the Dumps, written circa 1645, certainly after the Battle of Naseby on 14 June 1645 (on which day the scene is set), which includes the following lines:

Now when the king was in the West,
And not a little in distress,
He honoured Peter with a call
By night, incog., but that 's not all,
He wanted money for to spend
In waging war, that was the end,
And he knew those that had to lend.
To make the pledge more firm and sure,
Etched his sign manual on the door.

And:

In Peter's great and lofty hall,
Seated in order for to dine,
Swig cyder, beer, and meady wine.

== Marriage and children ==
At Bradninch on 12 May 1614 Sainthill married Dorothy Parker (called "Dame Dolly" in the satirical verse), daughter and heiress of Robert Parker of Zeal Monachorum in Devon, by his wife Mary. His children included:

- Peter IV Sainthill (born 1618), eldest son and heir apparent, died in infancy.
- Samuel Sainthill (1626-1708), 2nd and eldest surviving son and heir, who recovered much of his father's property sequestrated during the Civil War. In 1679 he erected the surviving monument to his father in Bradninch Church. He died unmarried and had been expected to appoint as his heir his nearest male relative John Sainthill (1676-1730) of Topsham, Devon, the son of his third cousin. However, "having given some offence, the old squire made a more natural choice" and left his estates instead to his nephew, Edward Yarde (1637-1732), of Tresbeare (son of his sister Dorothea Sainthill), who adopted the surname of Sainthill by Act of Parliament, and being a bachelor of 71, married, and died in 1732, aged 95, leaving one son Edward Sainthill, whose daughter and heiress Elizabeth Sainthill (1764-1843) married Rear Admiral Thomas Pearse (1759-1830), whose mural monument survives in Bradninch Church, and left a son George Pearse (1799-1861) of Bradninch House, the representative of the Sainthills of Bradninch and Yardes of Treasbeare. George Pearse was a solicitor and married Raby Hewitt, daughter of William Kellett Hewitt of St Elizabeth, Jamaica, a slave-owner. He founded the "George Pearse's Educational Foundation", still extant in the parish of Bradninch today, making grants to (amongst others) "Organisations, people of a particular ethnic or racial origin".

== Monument at Bradninch ==
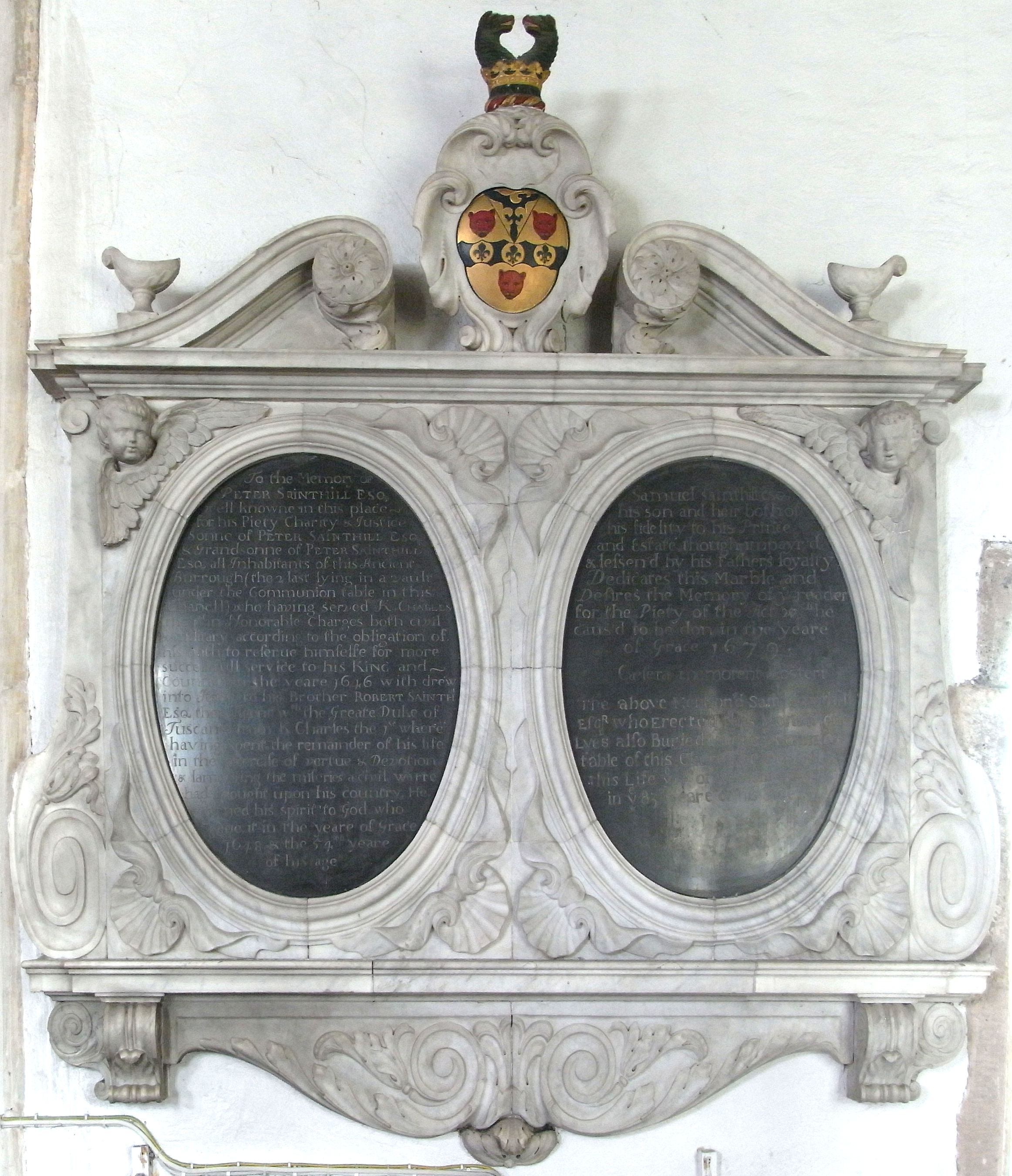
Mural monument to Peter Sainthill, St Disen's Church, Bradninch

His "very neat and tasteful" mural monument, erected in 1679 by his son Samuel, survives in St Disen's Church, Bradninch, on the north wall of the chancel. It consists of two elliptical tablets of black marble, set in a carved frame of white Italian marble, surmounted by the Sainthill arms and crest. The left tablet is inscribed as follows:

"To the memory of Peter Sainthill, Esq., well knowne in this place for his piety, charity & justice, sonne of Peter Sainthill, Esq., and grandsonne of Peter Sainthill, Esq., all inhabitants of this ancient Burrough (the 2 last lying in a vault under the Communion table in this chanc'll), who having served K. Charles the 1st in honorable charges, both civil & military, according to the obligation of his oath to reserve himselfe for more successful service to his King and country, in the yeare 1646 withdrew into Italy to his brother Robert Sainthill, Esq., then agent with the greate Duke of Tuscany from K. Charles the 1st, where having spent the remainder of his life in the exercise of vertue & devotion, & lamenting the miseries a civil warre had brought upon his country, he resigned his spirit to God who gave it, in the yeare of Grace 1648 & the 54th yeare of his age."

The right tablet is inscribed:

"Samuel Sainthill, his son and heir, both of his fidelity to his Prince and estate, though impayr'd & lessen'd by his father's loyalty, dedicates this marble, and desires the memory of ye reader for the piety of the act w'ch he caus'd to be don in the yeare of Grace 1679. Caetera Memorent Posteri. The above mention'd Sam'l Sainthill, Esq^{r}. who erected this monument, lyes also buried under ye Commu'on table of this Church. He departed this life ye 14th of Novem'r 1708 in ye 83^{d} yeare of his age"

Parliament of England
Vacant Parliament suspended since 1629	Member of Parliament for Tiverton; 1640–1644; With: Peter Ball; George Hartnall	Succeeded by Robert Shapcote; Joh Elford
