= Halberton Halt railway station =

Disused railway station in Halberton, Devon

Halberton Halt

General information
- Location: Halberton, Devon; England
- Coordinates: 50.8997°N 3.4234°W
- Grid reference: ST000121
- Platforms: 1

Other information
- Status: Disused

History
- Original company: Great Western Railway
- Post-grouping: Great Western Railway; British Railways (Western Region)

Key dates
- 5 December 1927: Opened
- 5 October 1964: Closed
Location

Halberton Halt railway station served the village of Halberton, Devon, England, from 1927 to 1964 on the Tiverton branch line.

== History ==
The station was opened on 5 December 1927 by the Great Western Railway. It was situated beneath Lower Town bridge. It closed on 5 October 1964.

Preceding station	Disused railways	Following station
Tiverton Junction; Line and station closed	Great Western Railway; Tiverton branch line	Tiverton; Line and station closed
