= Holcombe Rogus =

Village in Devon, England

Coordinates: 50.961°N 3.343°W

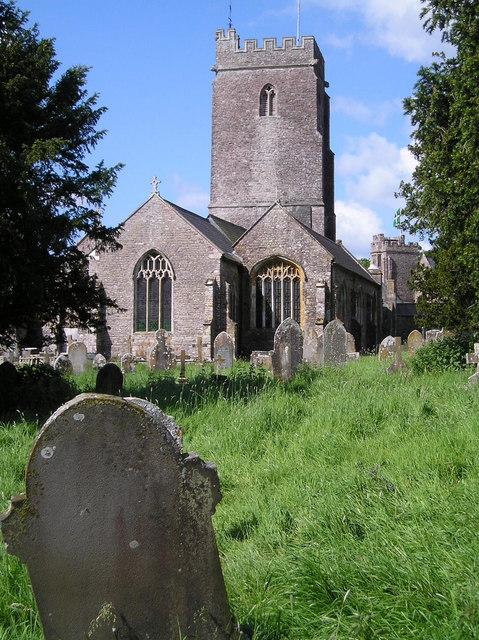
- All Saints' Church, Holcombe Rogus, viewed from the east; the porch tower of Holcombe Court is visible behind at right

- Location within Devon
- Population: 503 (2001 Census)
- District: Mid Devon
- Shire county: Devon
- Region: South West
- Country: England
- Sovereign state: United Kingdom
- Post town: WELLINGTON
- Postcode district: TA21
- UK Parliament: Tiverton and Minehead

Holcombe Rogus is a village, civil parish and ecclesiastical parish in the English county of Devon. In 2001 the population of the parish was 503.

== Name ==
The first element of the place-name is derived from Old English for a deep or hollow coomb (valley) and the second element refers to the holder of the land – at the time of the Domesday Book (1086) the tenant was Rogo or Rogus.

== Geography ==
The northern boundary of the parish forms part of the county boundary with Somerset and clockwise from the east it is bordered by the Devon parishes of Culmstock, Burlescombe, Sampford Peverell, and Hockworthy.

== History ==
At the time of the Domesday survey of 1086, Holcombe Rogus was assessed at 43 households under the tenancy of Baldwin the Sheriff, and included ploughlands, meadows, pasture, woodland, livestock and two mills, altogether valued at an annual £10.

By 1812, progress was being made with the construction of the Grand Western Canal, but it was hampered by rock cuttings at Holcombe Rogus, from which springs of water gushed, and there was a need to line some sections with puddle clay to prevent leakage. Lime kilns were constructed to provide the materials, which can still be seen beside the canal, close to the Waytown Tunnel.

In White's Devonshire Directory of 1850, the parish was 3,024 acres (1,224 ha), and had a population of 843. A market and fair, granted in 1343, were no longer held.

== Holcombe Court ==
The manor house known as Holcombe Court was the seat of the Bluett family for centuries. It is situated to the immediate west of the parish church, hidden behind a high boundary wall, and was described by W. G. Hoskins as "perhaps the finest Tudor house in Devon".

== Parish church ==
The parish church is dedicated to All Saints and is predominantly 15th-century. It contains several monuments to the Bluett family, including the 1615 tomb of Richard Bluett, his wife, Mary and their eleven children. There are also several mural monuments of the 18th century.
