= Ash Thomas =

Village in Devon, England

Coordinates: 50.88°N 03.42°W

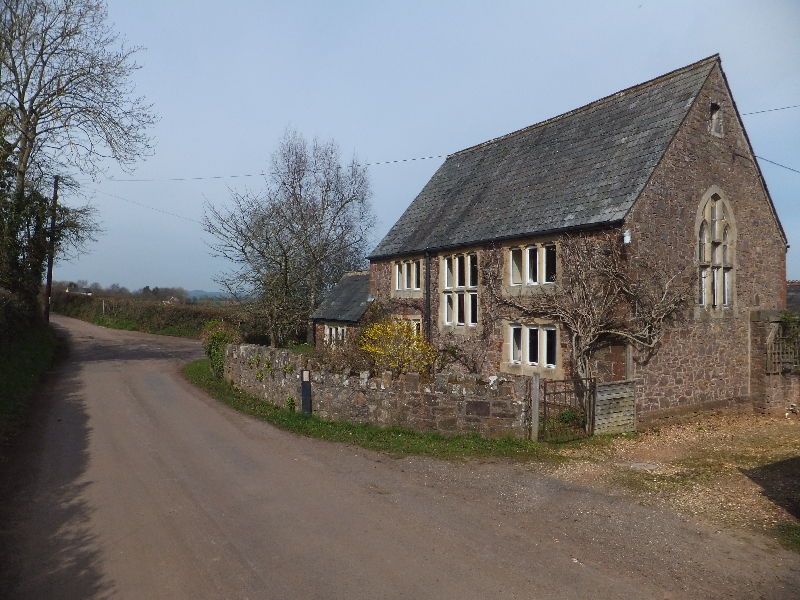
- Former school at Ash Thomas

- Location within Devon
- OS grid reference: ST0010
- Civil parish: Halberton
- District: Mid Devon
- Shire county: Devon
- Region: South West
- Country: England
- Sovereign state: United Kingdom
- Post town: Tiverton
- Postcode district: EX16
- Police: Devon and Cornwall
- Fire: Devon and Somerset
- Ambulance: South Western
- UK Parliament: Tiverton and Minehead

Ash Thomas is a village in Devon, England.

Ash Thomas was listed in the Domesday Book of 1086.

There is a village hall in Ash Thomas.
