= Tiverton Parkway railway station =

Railway station in Devon, England

Tiverton Parkway
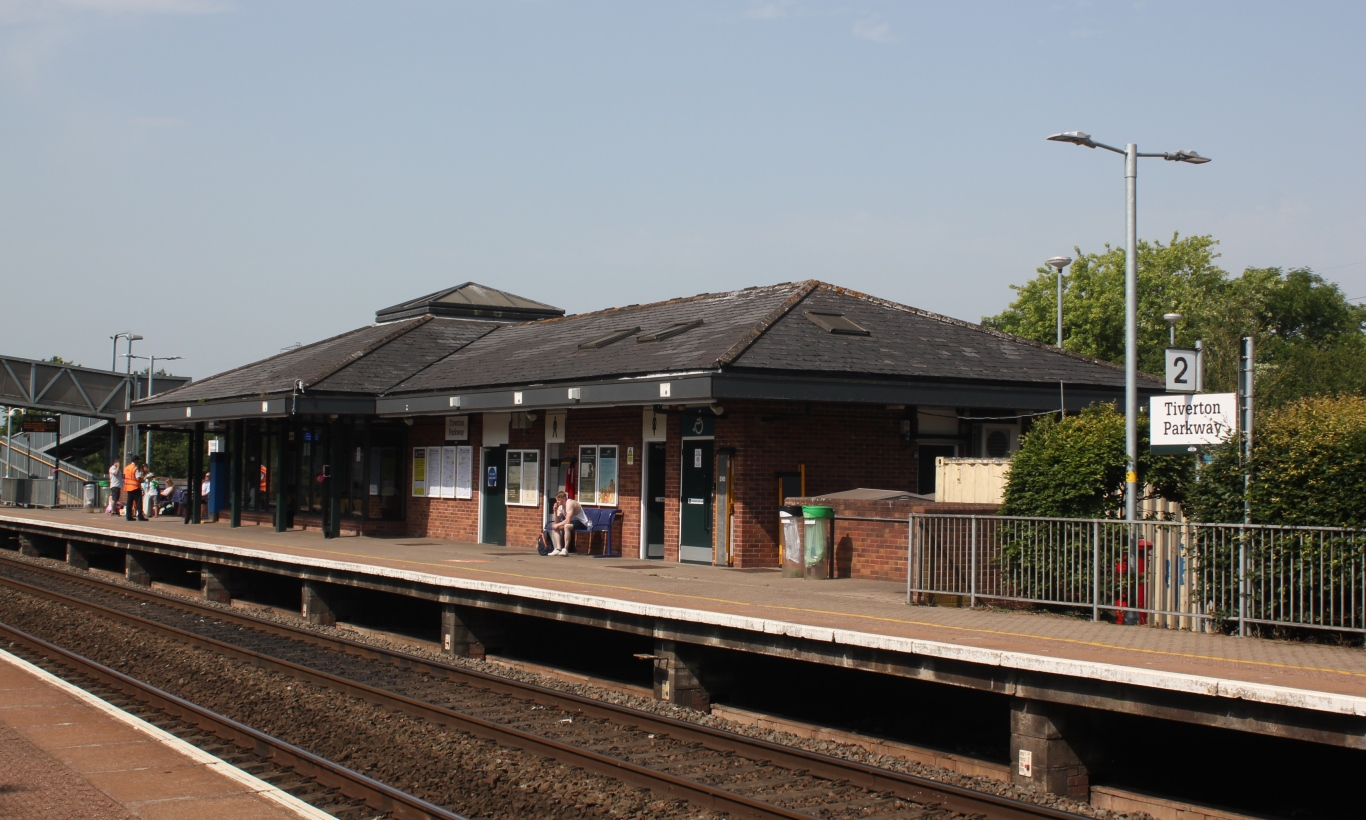

General information
- Location: Sampford Peverell, Mid Devon; England
- Coordinates: 50.917°N 3.360°W
- Grid reference: ST045139
- Manager: Great Western Railway
- Platforms: 2

Other information
- Station code: TVP
- Classification: DfT category D

History
- Original company: British Rail

Key dates
- Opened: 12 May 1986

Passengers
- 2021/22: ▲0.405 million
- 2022/23: ▲0.524 million
- 2023/24: ▲0.581 million
- 2024/25: ▲0.683 million
- 2025/26: ▲0.733 million
Location
Notes
- Passenger statistics from the Office of Rail and Road

Tiverton Parkway railway station is on the Bristol to Exeter line in Devon, England. Despite being named after the town of Tiverton, it is actually located a short distance from the village of Sampford Peverell, 6 miles (9.7 km) to the east of Tiverton, and close to the junction of the M5 motorway with the A361 North Devon link road. It is 177 miles (285 km) from the zero point at London Paddington via Bristol Temple Meads.

The station is operated by Great Western Railway and is also served by CrossCountry trains.

== History ==
The Bristol and Exeter Railway opened on 1 May 1844 but it ran south of Tiverton, so a station known as "Tiverton Road" was opened to serve the town. This station was renamed "Tiverton Junction" on 12 June 1848 when the Tiverton branch line was opened to a station in the town itself.

By the 1980s the branch to Tiverton had closed and Tiverton Junction station only saw a couple of trains in each direction each day so a decision was taken to relocate the station a short distance to the east, close to the motorway junction where traffic from Barnstaple and Ilfracombe from the A361 joined. Tiverton Junction closed on 11 May 1986 but the new station, Tiverton Parkway, was opened the following day by David Mitchell MP, the Minister of Transport at the time. It was built by British Rail on the site of the former Sampford Peverell railway station that had closed on 5 October 1964.

An additional car park for the station was opened in late 2007 as the original car park was too small when First Great Western increased the services to the station. The additional car park is situated alongside (but not accessed by) the A361 road and requires a short walk to the station, while the original is alongside the platform.

== Facilities ==
The main entrance and a large car park are on the west side of the station, where a single-storey brick building at platform level incorporates a ticket office and a shop selling newspapers, drinks and snacks. This is the platform for trains towards London Paddington, Bristol Temple Meads and the north.

Access to the platform for trains towards Exeter, Plymouth and Penzance is over a ramped footbridge. The buildings on this platform are two large metal and glass waiting shelters. A cycleway crosses the line on this footbridge and allows access on foot or cycle from the east side.

== Services ==
The main line services through Tiverton are provided by two operators:

- Great Western Railway operates high-speed intercity services from London Paddington via two routes, either the direct Reading to Taunton Line or on the Great Western Main Line through Bristol Temple Meads. It also operates regional services which start in the Bristol area.
- CrossCountry operates services from Scotland and the north of England via Birmingham New Street and Bristol Temple Meads.

The trains of both operators continue beyond Tiverton Parkway to serve stations onwards into Devon and Cornwall, including Exeter St Davids, Plymouth, Paignton and Penzance.

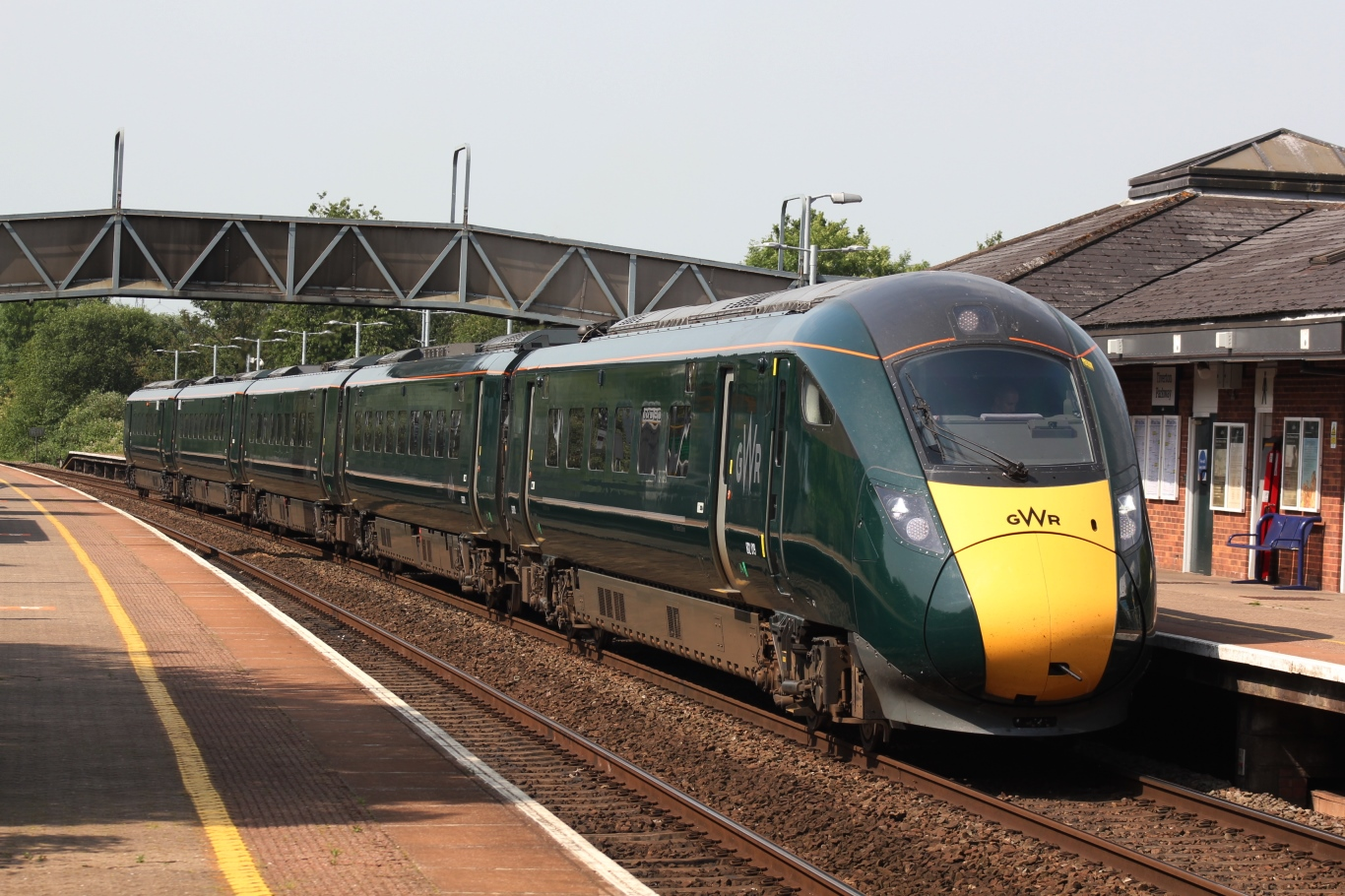
A Class 802 with a service to London Paddington

Preceding station	National Rail	Following station
Taunton	Great Western Railway; Bristol to Exeter line	Exeter St Davids
Taunton	CrossCountry; Scotland to Penzance	Exeter St Davids

There are regular daily bus services to Tiverton and Cullompton on service 373 from outside the station building and is operated by Stagecoach South West.

In addition to being situated close to the junction of the M5 motorway and the A361 North Devon link road, the National Cycle Network Route 3 (Bristol to Land's End) passes through the station and provides a safe and quiet route to local towns.

The proximity of the station to the motorway - and the relative inaccessibility of Exeter St Davids station in the city of Exeter - means that it is often used as the 'coach exchange' when the line between Exeter and Plymouth is closed and rail passengers are detrained onto coaches for the remainder of the journey. This was particularly evident in early 2014 when a storm breached the sea wall at Dawlish causing disruption to train services west of Exeter; a coach park was built to accommodate the coaches used for this.

== See also ==
- List of Parkway railway stations
