= Peter Sainthill (died 1571) =

English politician

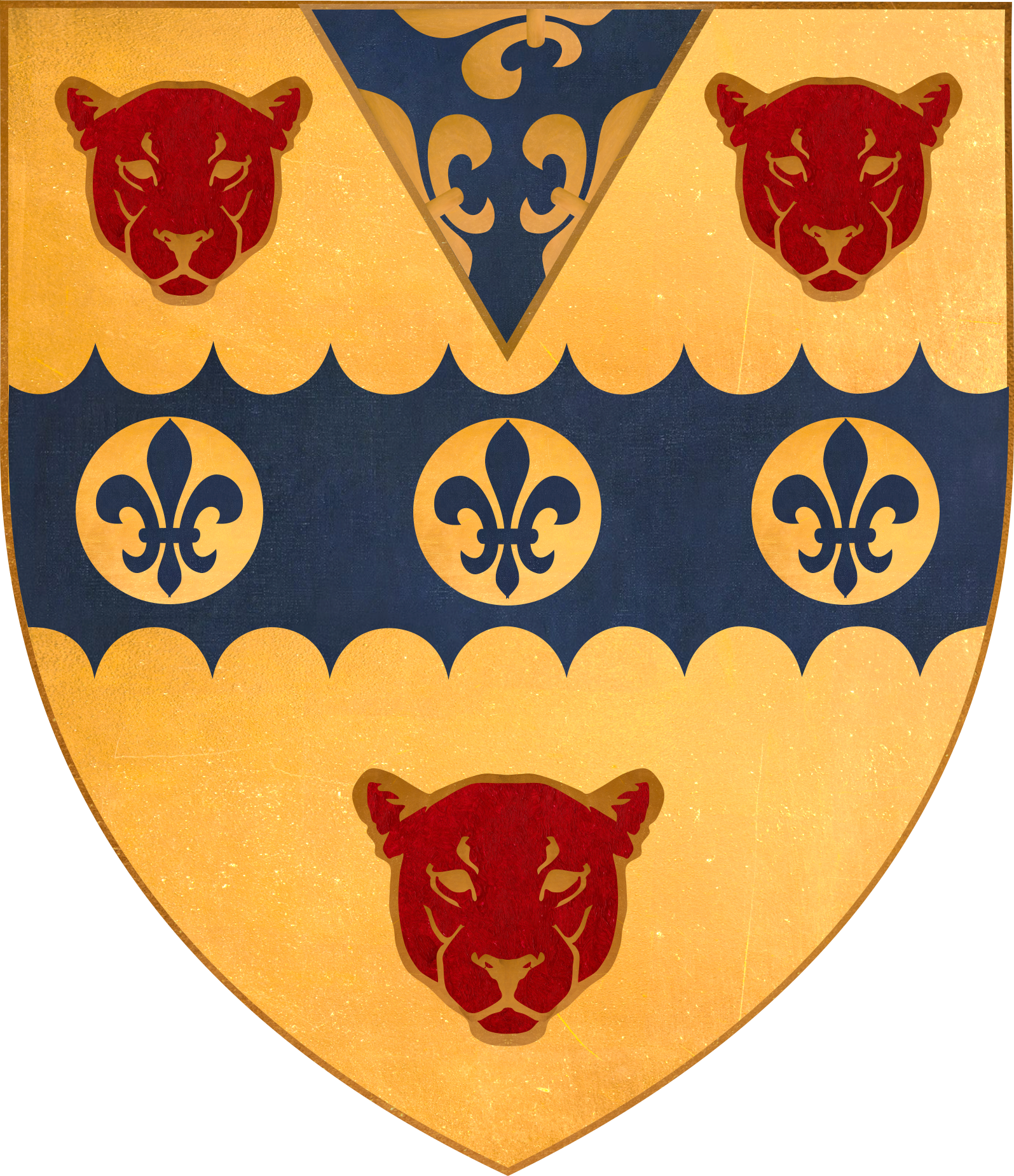
Arms of Sainthill: Or, on a fess engrailed azure between three leopard's faces gules three bezants each charged with a fleur-de-lys of the second on a pile in chief of the second three demi-fleurs-de-lys attached to the top and sides of the first. These arms were granted in 1546 by Sir Christopher Barker, Garter King of Arms, to Peter Sainthill (c. 1524 – 1571) of Bradninch.

Peter Nicolas Sainthill (by 1524 – 1571) was an English politician.

He was a Member (MP) of the Parliament of England for Grampound in 1547 and for Saltash in April 1554.
