= National Cycle Route 3 =

Cycle route in the United Kingdom

- Length: 527 km (327 mi)
- Trailheads: Bristol (north); Land's End (south)
- Waymark

Route map
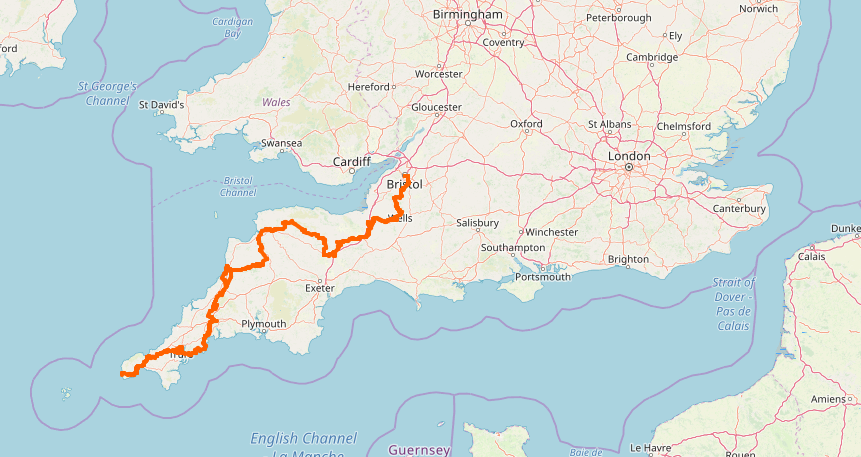
- National Cycle Route 3

National Cycle Route 3 (or NCR 3) is a route of the United Kingdom National Cycle Network, running from Bristol to Land's End.

== Route ==
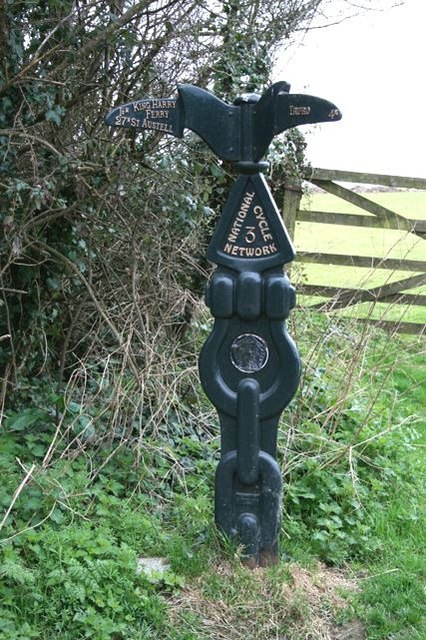
National Cycle Network signpost near Penelewey

=== Bristol to Bridgwater ===
West Harptree | Charterhouse | Wookey Hole | Glastonbury

The route goes south from Bristol into Somerset and around Chew Valley Lake

=== Bridgwater to Land's End ===
Taunton | Bideford | Bude | Bodmin

== See also ==
- The Cornish Way Bude to Bodmin section
