= North Radworthy =

- Hamlet
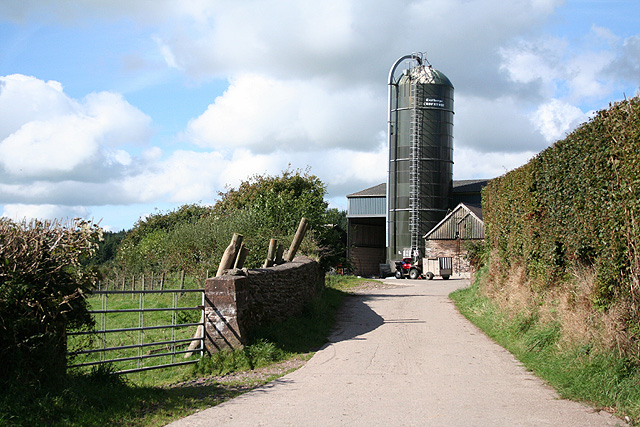
- Farm at North Radworthy

- Location within Devon
- Coordinates: 51°5′34.94″N 3°46′55.82″W
- Country: United Kingdom
- County: Devon
- District: North Devon
- Parish: North Molton

North Radworthy is a hamlet and historic estate in the civil parish and former manor of North Molton, in the North Devon district of the county of Devon, England. It is about three miles north of the village of North Molton, and about fifteen miles to the east of the town of Barnstaple. The hamlet sits on an unclassified road, and is surrounded to the north, south and west by woodland. North Radworthy Farm is the centre of the historic estate.

== Domesday Book ==
North Radworthy is mentioned in the Domesday Book, alongside the neighbouring hamlet of South Radworthy. They both sit in the ancient Hundred of South Molton, one of thirty two ancient administrative units of the county of Devon.

The entry in the Domesday Book for North and South Radworthy stated a population of twelve households (eight villagers and four slaves) which was tax assessed to pay a total of 0.3 geld units. The land value in 1086 was recorded as £3 which was an increase from the c.1070 recording of £0.8. The Anglo-Saxon lord of the manor before 1066 was Alward son of Toki but after the Norman Conquest, as recorded in the Domesday Book of 1086, was William Cheever (Latinised to Capra, "she-goat", from French Chèvre), who was a tenant-in-chief of the king. The agricultural land in North and South Radworthy consisted of three ploughlands (two lord's plough teams and one men's plough teams); 0.12 lord's lands; one acre of meadow land; forty acres of pasture land; one league of woodland and one furlong of mixed measures. The land held ten cattle, four pigs and fifty sheep.
