= English feudal barony =

Medieval English noble title and type of land tenure

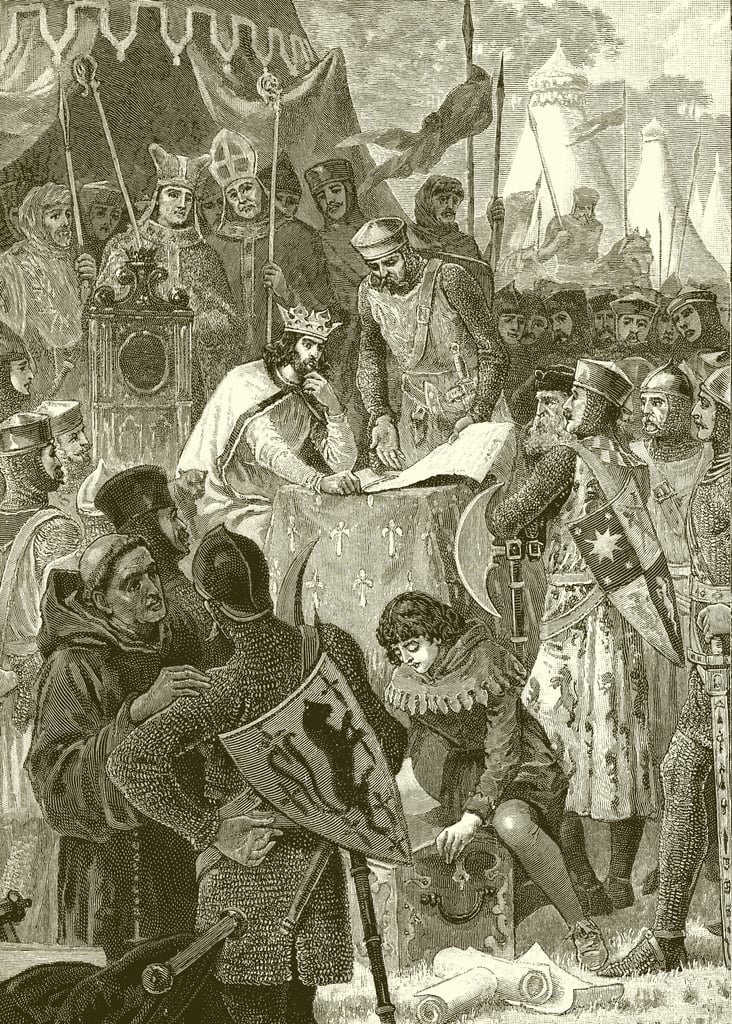
King John signs Magna Carta at Runnymede in 1215, surrounded by his baronage. Illustration from Cassell's History of England, 1902.

In the medieval kingdom of England, a feudal barony or barony by tenure, which could also be called a fief or honour held per baroniam was a specific type of large honour – a fief made up of several lordships, and generally held in chief directly from the king – except that these honours were treated differently for the purposes of taxation and inheritance. While the words honour, fief and barony could be used flexibly, these baronies are specially noted in fiscal records, and roughly correspond to the largest fiefs or honours which were created by the Norman dynasty between 1086, and the death of Henry I of England in 1135.

The duties owed by and the privileges granted to feudal barons are not exactly defined, but they involved the duty of providing soldiers to the royal feudal army on demand by the king, and the privilege of attendance at the king's feudal court, the Magnum Concilium, the precursor of parliament.

If the estate-in-land held by barony contained a significant castle as its caput baroniae (Note: The term 'caput baroniae' is often shortened to 'caput') and if it was especially large – consisting of more than about 20 knight's fees (each loosely equivalent to a manor) – then it was termed an honour. The typical honour had properties scattered over several shires, intermingled with the properties of others. This was a specific policy of the Norman kings, to avoid establishing any one area under the control of a single lord. Usually, though, a more concentrated cluster existed somewhere. Here would lie the caput (head) of the honour, with a castle that gave its name to the honour and served as its administrative headquarters. The term honour is particularly useful for the eleventh and twelfth centuries, before the development of an extensive peerage hierarchy.

This type of barony is different from the type of feudal barony which existed within a county palatine. A county palatine was an independent franchise so its baronies were considered the highest rank of feudal tenure in the county and not the kingdom, such as the barony of Halton within the Palatinate of Chester.

== Creation ==
William the Conqueror established his favoured followers as barons by enfeoffing them as tenants-in-chief with great fiefdoms to be held per baroniam, a largely standard feudal contract of tenure, common to all his barons. Such barons were not necessarily always from the greater Norman nobles, but were selected often on account of their personal abilities and usefulness. Thus, for instance, Turstin FitzRolf, the relatively humble and obscure knight who had stepped in at the last minute to accept the position of Duke William's standard-bearer at the Battle of Hastings, was granted a barony which comprised well over twenty manors.

Lands forming a barony were often located in several different counties, not necessarily adjoining. The name of such a barony is generally deemed to be the name of the chief manor within it, known as the Caput, Latin for "head", generally assumed to have been the seat or chief residence of the first baron. So, for instance, the barony of Turstin FitzRolf became known as the barony of North Cadbury, Somerset.

The exact date of creation of most feudal baronies cannot be determined, as their founding charters have been lost. Many of them are first recorded in the Domesday Book survey of 1086.

== Servitium debitum ==
The feudal obligation imposed by the grant of a barony was termed in Latin the servitium debitum or "service owed" and was set as a quota of knights to be provided for the king's service. It bore no constant relation to the amount of land comprised by the barony, but was fixed by a bargain between the king and the baron.

It was at the discretion of the baron as to how these knights were found. The commonest method was for him to split his barony into several fiefs of between a few hundred acres possibly up to a thousand acres each, into each of which he would sub-enfeoff one knight, by the tenure of knight-service. This tenure gave the knight use of the fief and all its revenues, on condition that he should provide to the baron, now his overlord, 40 days of military service, complete with retinue of esquires, horses and armour. The fief so allotted is known as a knight's fee. Alternatively the baron could keep the entire barony, or a part of it, in demesne, that is to say "in-hand" or under his own management, using the revenues it produced to buy the services of mercenary knights known as "stipendiary knights".

=== Under- and over-enfeoffment ===
Where a baron had sub-enfeoffed fewer knights than required by the servitium debitum, the barony was said to be "under-enfeoffed", and the balance of knights owing had to be produced super dominium, that is "on the demesne". This does not mean they were resident within the baron's demesne, but that they had to be hired with the revenue arising from it.

Conversely, a barony was "over-enfeoffed" where more knights had been enfeoffed than was required by the servitium debitum, and this indicated that the barony had been obtained on overly-favourable terms.

=== Cartae Baronum ===
The Cartae Baronum ("Charters of the Barons") was a survey commissioned by the Treasury in 1166. It required each baron (Note: The survey in fact covered all the king's tenants-in-chief, not just those who held per baroniam, which adds much uncertainty as to the exact meaning of the term "baron".) to declare how many knights he had enfeoffed and how many were super dominium, with the names of all. It appears that the survey was designed to identify baronies from which a greater servitium debitum could in future be obtained by the king.

== Summons to Parliament ==
The privilege which balanced the burden of the servitium debitum was the baron's right to attend the king's council. Originally all barons who held per baroniam received individual writs of summons to attend Parliament. This was a practical measure because the early kings almost continually travelled around the kingdom, taking their court (i.e. administration) with them.

A king only called a parliament, or council, when the need arose for either advice or funding. This lack of a parliamentary schedule meant that the barons needed to be informed when and where to attend. As baronies became fragmented over time due to failure of male heirs and descent via co-heiresses (see below), many of those who held per baroniam became holders of relatively small fiefdoms. Eventually, the king refused to summon such minor nobles to Parliament by personal writ, sending instead a general writ of summons to the sheriff of each shire, who was to summon only representatives of these so-called lesser barons. The greater barons, who retained sufficient power to insist upon it, continued to receive personal summonses. The king came to realise, from the complacency of the lesser barons with this new procedure, that in practice it was not tenure per baroniam which determined attendance at Parliament, but receipt of a writ of summons originated by himself.

The next logical development was that the king started issuing writs to persons who did not hold per baroniam and who were not therefore feudal barons, but "barons by writ". The reason for summoning by writ was based on personal characteristics, for example the man summoned might be one of exceptional judgement or have valuable military skills. The arbitrary summons by personal writ signalled the start of the decline of feudalism, eventually evolving into summons by public proclamation in the form of letters patent.

== Deemed feudal barons ==
The higher prelates such as archbishops and bishops were deemed to hold per baroniam, and were thus members of the baronage entitled to attend Parliament, indeed they formed the greatest grouping of all. Marcher lords in Wales often held their lordships by right of conquest and appear to have been deemed feudal barons. The Barons of the Cinque Ports were also deemed feudal barons by virtue of their military service at sea, and were thus entitled to attend Parliament.

== Baronial relief ==
Baronial relief was payable by an heir so that he might lawfully take possession of his inheritance. It was a form of one-off taxation, or more accurately a variety of "feudal incident", levyable by the king on his tenants-in-chief for a variety of reasons. A prospective heir to a barony generally paid £100 in baronial relief for his inheritance. The term "relief" implies "elevation", both words being derived from the Latin levo, to raise up, into a position of honour.

Where a barony was split into two, for example on the death of a baron leaving two co-heiresses, each daughter's husband would become a baron in respect of his moiety (mediaeval French for "half"), paying half of the full baronial relief. A tenant-in-chief could be the lord of fractions of several different baronies, if he or his ancestors had married co-heiresses. The tenure of even the smallest fraction of a barony conferred baronial status on the lord of these lands. This natural fragmentation of the baronies led to great difficulties within the royal administration as the king relied on an ever-increasing number of men responsible for supplying soldiers for the royal army, and the records of the identities of these fractional barons became more complex and unreliable. The early English jurist Henry de Bracton (died 1268) was one of the first writers to examine the concept of the feudal barony.

== Abolition and surviving vestiges ==
The power of the feudal barons to control their landholding was considerably weakened in 1290 by the statute of Quia Emptores. This prohibited land from being the subject of a feudal grant, and allowed its transfer without the feudal lord's permission.

Feudal baronies became perhaps obsolete (but not extinct) on the abolition of feudal tenure during the Civil War, as confirmed by the Tenures Abolition Act 1660 passed under the Restoration which took away knights service and other legal rights.

Under the Tenures Abolition Act 1660, many baronies by tenure were converted into baronies by writ. The rest ceased to exist as feudal baronies by tenure, becoming baronies in free socage, that is to say under a "free" (hereditable) contract requiring payment of monetary rents. Thus baronies could no longer be held by military service. Parliamentary titles of honour had been limited since the 15th century by the Modus Tenenda Parliamenta act, and could thenceforth only be created by writ of summons or letters patent.

Tenure by knight-service was abolished and discharged and the lands covered by such tenures, including once-feudal baronies, were henceforth held by socage (i.e. in exchange for monetary rents). The English Fitzwalter Case in 1670 ruled that barony by tenure had been discontinued for many years and any claims to a peerage on such basis, meaning a right to sit in the House of Lords, were not to be revived, nor any right of succession based on them. In the Berkeley Case in 1861, an attempt was made to claim a seat in the House of Lords by right of a barony by tenure, but the House of Lords ruled that whatever might have been the case in the past, baronies by tenure no longer existed, meaning that a barony could not be held "by tenure", and confirmed the Tenures Abolition Act 1660. Three Redesdale Committee Reports in the early 19th century reached the same conclusion. There has been at least one legal opinion which asserts the continuing legal existence of the feudal barony in England and Wales, namely that from 1996 of A. W. & C. Barsby, barristers of Grays's Inn. As of 2025 the Feudal Barony of Otford is the only English feudal barony title registered at the Land Registry.

=== Geographical survivals ===
Survivals of feudal baronies, in their geographical form, are the Barony of Westmorland or Appleby, the Barony of Kendal, the Barony of Arundel and the Barony of Abergavenny. The first two terms now describe areas of the historic county of Westmorland, in the same way that the word "county" itself has lost its feudal meaning of a land area under the control of a count or earl.

== Lists ==
Ivor J. Sanders searched the archives, for example Exchequer documents such as fine rolls and pipe rolls, for entries recording the payment of baronial relief and published his results in English Baronies, a Study of their Origin and Descent 1086–1327 (Oxford, 1960). He identified a number of certain baronies where evidence was found of payment of baronial relief, and a further group which he termed "probable baronies" where the evidence was less clear. Where he could not identify a caput, Sanders named the barony after the name of the baron, for example the "Barony of Miles of Gloucester". The following lists include all of Sanders' certain and probable baronies.

For a full comprehensive list of feudal baronies in the 13th century along with earldoms, bishoprics, and archbishoprics see List of nobles and magnates of England in the 13th century.

=== Certain baronies ===
Name of barony	County of caput	First known tenant	Earliest record
Aldington	Kent	William FitzHelte	1073
Arundel	Sussex	Roger de Montgomery	pre-1087
Ashby	Lincolnshire	Gilbert de Neville	1162
Ashfield	Suffolk	Robert Blund	1086
Atherleigh	Lancashire	Domhnall Uí Bhriain	post-1086
Aveley	Essex	John FitzWaleran	1086
Bampton	Devon	Walter de Douai	1086
Biset	–	Manasser Biset (d. 1177)	pre-1177
Gloucester (baronial court at Bristol)	Gloucestershire	Robert FitzHamon (d. 1107)	pre-1107
Brecon	Brecon	Miles de Gloucester	1125
Basing	Hampshire	Hugh de Port	1086
Beckley	Oxfordshire	Roger d'Ivry	1086
Bedford	Bedfordshire	Hugh de Beauchamp	1086
Belvoir	Leicestershire	Robert de Todeni	1086
Benington	Hertfordshire	Peter I de Valoynes	1086
Berkeley	Gloucestershire	Robert FitzHarding	temp. Henry II, pre-1166
Berkhampstead	Hertfordshire	Robert, count of Mortain	1086
Beverstone	Gloucestershire	Robert de Gurney	1235
Blagdon	Somerset	Serlo de Burci	1086
Blankney	Lincolnshire	Walter I de Aincourt	1086
Blythborough	Suffolk	William FitzWalter	1157
Bolham	Northumberland	James de Newcastle	1154
Bolingbroke	Lincolnshire	Ivo de Taillebois	1086
Bourn	Cambridgeshire	Picot	1086
Bradninch	Devon	William Capra	1086
Bulwick	Northamptonshire	Richard FitzUrse	1130
Burgh-by-Sands	Cumberland	Robert de Trevers	temp. Henry I (1100–1135)
Burstwick (Holderness)	Yorkshire	Drogo de Bevrere	1086
Bywell	Northumberland	Guy de Balliol	temp. William II (1087–1100)
Cainhoe	Bedfordshire	Nigel d'Aubigny (d. before 1107)	1086
Castle Cary	Somerset	Walter de Douai	1086
Castle Combe	Wiltshire	Humphrey de Insula	1086
Castle Holgate	Shropshire	"Helgot"	1086
Caus	Shropshire	Roger FitzCorbet	11th century
Cavendish	Suffolk	Ralph I de Limesy	1086
Caxton	Cambridgeshire	Hardwin de Scales	1086
Chatham	Kent	Robert le Latin (held under Odo Bishop of Bayeux)	1086
Chester	Cheshire	Gerbod the Fleming	1070
Chilham	Kent	Richard FitzRoy	1190
Chipping Warden	Northamptonshire	Guy de Reinbuedcurt	1086
Chiselborough (Note: Chiselborough held from Robert Count of Mortain)	Somerset	Alured "Pincerna"	1086
Clare	Suffolk	Richard fitz Gilbert	c. 1090
Clifford	Hereford	Ralph de Tony	1086
Cogges	Oxfordshire	Wadard (held under Odo Bishop of Bayeux)	1086
Cottingham	Yorkshire	Hugh fitzBaldric	1086
Crick	Derbyshire	Ralph FitzHubert	1086
Curry Malet	Somerset	Roger de Courcelles	1086
Eaton Bray	Bedfordshire	William I de Cantilupe	1205
Eaton Socon	Bedfordshire	Eudo Dapifer	1086
Ellingham	Northumberland	Nicholas de Grenville	temp. Henry I
Embleton	Northumberland	John FitzOdard	temp. Henry I
Erlestoke	Wiltshire	Roger I de Mandeville	temp. Henry I
Ewyas Harold	Herefordshire	Alfred of Marlborough	1086
Eye	Suffolk	Robert Malet	1086
Field Dalling/St. Hilary	Norfolk	Hasculf de St James	1138
Flockthorpe in Hardingham	Norfolk	Ralph de Camoys	1236
Folkestone	Kent	William de Arques (held under Odo Bishop of Bayeux)	c. 1090
Folkingham	Lincolnshire	Gilbert de Gant	1086
Framlingham	Suffolk	Roger I Bigod	1086 / temp. Henry I
Freiston	Lincolnshire	Guy de Craon	1086
Great Bealings	Suffolk	Hervey de Bourges	1086
Great Torrington	Devon	Odo FitzGamelin	1086
Great Weldon	Northamptonshire	Robert de Buci	1086
Greystoke	Cumberland	Forne son of Sigulf	1086
Hanslope	Buckinghamshire	Winemar the Fleming	1086
Hasley/Haseley	Buckinghamshire	Rodger d'Yorey	1086
Hatch Beauchamp	Somerset	Robert FitzIvo (under Count of Mortain)	1086
Headington	Oxfordshire	Thomas Basset	1203
Headingham	Essex	Aubry I de Vere	1086
Helmsley	Yorkshire	Walter Espec	temp. Henry I
Hockering	Norfolk	Ralph de Belfou	1086
Hook Norton	Oxfordshire	Robert d'Oilly	1086
Hooton Pagnell	Yorkshire	Richard de Surdeval (under Count of Mortain) (part) Ralph Pagnell (under King) (part)	1086
Hunsingore	Yorkshire	Erneis de Burun	1086
Kendal	Westmorland	Ivo de Taillebois	temp. William II
Kington	Herefordshire	Adam de Port	c. 1121
Kirklinton	Cumberland	Adam I de Boivill(?)	post temp. Henry I
Knaresborough	Yorkshire	William de Stuteville	c. 1175
Kymmer-yn-Edeirnion	Merionethshire	Gruffydd ab Iorwerth ab Owain Brogyntyn	1284
Launceston	Cornwall	Descent as Earl of Cornwall	1086
Leicester	Leicestershire	Hugh de Grandmesnil	1086
Long Crendon	Buckinghamshire	Walter I Giffard	1086
Marshwood	Dorset	Geoffrey de Mandeville	temp. Henry I
Monmouth	Monmouthshire	Withenoc	c. 1066
Morpeth	Northumberland	William I de Merlay	temp. Henry I
Much Marcle	Herefordshire	William fitzBaderon	1086
Mulgrave	Yorkshire	Nigel Fossard	1086
Nether Stowey	Somerset	Alfred de Hispania	1086
Nocton	Lincolnshire	Norman I de Darcy	1086
North Cadbury	Somerset	Turstin FitzRolf	1086
Odell	Bedfordshire	Walter le Fleming	1086
Okehampton	Devon	Baldwin FitzGilbert	1086
Old Buckenham	Norfolk	William d'Aubigny Pincerna	temp. Henry I
Oswestry	Shropshire	Warin the Bold (held from Roger of Montgomery)	temp. William II
Pleshy	Essex	Geoffrey I de Mandeville	1086
Poorstock	Dorset	Roger I Arundel	1086
Prudhoe	Northumberland	Robert I de Umfraville	temp. William I (1066–1087)
Pulverbatch	Shropshire	Roger I Venator (held from Roger of Montgomery)	1086
Rayne	Essex	Roger de Raimes	1086
Redbourne	Lincolnshire	Jocelin FitzLambert	1086
Richard's Castle	Herefordshire	Osbern fitzRichard	1086
Salwarpe	Worcestershire	Urse d'Abitot (held from Roger of Montgomery)	1086
Shelford	Nottinghamshire	Geoffrey de Alselin	1086
Skelton	Yorkshire	Robert de Brus	temp. Henry I
Skirpenbeck	Yorkshire	Odo the Crossbowman	1086
Snodhill	Herefordshire	Hugh the Ass	1086
Sotby	Lincolnshire	William I Kyme (held from Walden the Engineer)	1086
Southoe	Huntingdonshire	Eustace Sheriff of Huntingdonshire	1086
Stafford	Staffordshire	Robert I de Stafford	1086
Stainton le Vale	Lincolnshire	Ralph de Criol	temp. Henry I
Stansted Mountfitchet	Essex	Robert Gernon	1086
Staveley	Derbyshire	Hascuil I Musard	1086
Stoke Trister	Somerset	Bretel St Clair	1086
Styford	Northumberland	Walter I de Bolbec	temp. Henry I
Sudeley	Gloucestershire	Harold de Sudeley	1066
Tarrington	Herefordshire	Ansfrid de Cormeilles	1086
Tattershall	Lincolnshire	Eudo son of Spirewic	1086
Thoresway	Lincolnshire	Alfred of Lincoln	1086
Totnes	Devon	Juhel de Totnes	1086
Trematon	Cornwall	Reginald I de Vautort (held from Count of Mortain)	1086
Trowbridge	Wiltshire	Brictric	1086
Walkern	Hertfordshire	Derman	temp. William I
Wallingford	Berkshire	Milo Crispin	1086
Warwick	Warwickshire	Robert de Beaumont, Count of Meulan	1086
Weedon Pinkeny/Lois	Northamptonshire	Ghilo I de Pinkeny	1086
Wem	Shropshire	William Pantulf (held from Roger, Earl of Montgomery)	temp. William II
Weobley	Herefordshire	Walter de Lacy	temp. William I
West Dean	Wiltshire	Waleran the Huntsman	1086
West Greenwich	Kent	Gilbert de Maminot, Bishop of Lisieux (held from Odo Bishop of Bayeux)	1086
Whitchurch	Buckinghamshire	Hugh I de Bolbec	1086
Wigmore	Herefordshire	William FitzOsbern	temp. William I
Winterbourne St Martin	Dorset	widow of Hugh FitzGrip	1086
Wolverton	Buckinghamshire	Manno le Breton	1086
Wormegay	Norfolk	Hermer de Ferrers	1086
Writtle	Essex	Isobel of Huntingdon, sister and co-heir of John the Scot, Earl of Chester	1241

Source: Sanders (1960)

=== Probable baronies ===
Name of barony	County of caput	First known tenant	Earliest record
Alnwick	Northumberland	Ivo de Vesci	11th century
Appleby	Westmorland	Robert de Vieuxpont	1203/4
Asthall	Oxfordshire	Roger d'Ivery	1086
Barnstaple	Devon	Geoffrey de Mowbray (see House of Mowbray)	1086
Barony of Port	Kent	Hugh de Port	1086
Barony de Ros	Kent	Geoffrey I de Ros	1086
Beanley	Northumberland	Gospatric, Earl of Dunbar	temp. Henry I (1100–1135)
Berry Pomeroy	Devon	Ralph de Pomeroy	1086
Bothal	Northumberland	Richard I Bertram	pre-1162
Bourne	Lincolnshire	William de Rollos	1100–1130
Bramber	Sussex	William I de Braose	1086
Brattleby	Lincolnshire	Colswain	1086
Callerton	Northumberland	Hubert de la Val	11th century
Cardinham	Cornwall	Richard FitzTurold	temp. William I (1066–1087)
Chepstow	Monmouthshire	William FitzOsbern, 1st Earl of Hereford	pre-1070
Chilham	Kent	Fulbert I de Dover	1086
Chitterne	Wiltshire	Edward of Salisbury	1086
Christchurch	Hampshire	Richard de Reviers	1100–1107
Clun	Shropshire	Robert "Picot de Say"	1086
Dudley	Worcestershire	William FitzAnsculf	1086
Dunster	Somerset	William I de Mohun	1086
Dursley	Gloucestershire	Roger I de Berkeley	1086
Egremont	Cumberland	William Meschin	temp. Henry I
Elston-in-Orcheston St George	Wiltshire	Osbern Giffard	1086
Eton	Buckinghamshire (Note: Now in Berkshire)	Walter FitzOther	1086
Flamstead	Hertfordshire	Ralph I de Tony	1086
Fotheringay	Northamptonshire	Waltheof son of Siward, Earl of Huntingdon and Northampton	pre-1086
Hadstone	Northumberland	Aschantinus de Worcester	temp. Henry I
Hastings	Sussex	William II, Count of Eu	1086
Hatfield Peverel	Essex	Ranulph Peverel	1086
Haughley	Suffolk	Hugh de Montfort	1086
Helions Bumpstead	Essex	Tihel	1086
Hepple	Northumberland	Waltheof	pre-1161
Horsley	Derbyshire	Ralph de Burun	1086
Irthington	Cumberland	Ranulph le Meschin	c. 1100
Keevil	Wiltshire	Ernulph de Hesding	pre-1091
Kempsford	Gloucestershire	Ernulf I de Hesding	11th/12th centuries
Kentwell	Suffolk	Frodo	1086
Knaresborough Forest	Yorkshire	Robert I, King of Scotland	temp. Edward II (1307–1327)
Lancaster	Lancashire	Roger the Poitevin	temp. William I
Langley	Northumberland	Adam I de Tindale	1165
Lavendon	Buckinghamshire	Bishop of Coutances	1086
Lewes	Sussex	William I de Warenne	1086
Liddel Strength	Cumberland	Ranulph le Meschin	pre-1121
Little Dunmow	Essex	Ralph Bayard	1086
Little Easton	Essex	Walter the Deacon	1086
Manchester	Lancashire	Albert de Gresle	temp. William II (1087–1100)
Mitford	Northumberland	John	pre temp. Henry I
Odcombe (Note: Odcombe held from Count of Mortain 1086)	Somerset	Ansgar I Brito	1086
Old Wardon	Bedfordshire	William Speche (Espec)	1086
Papcastle	Cumberland	Waldeve	temp. Henry I
Patricksbourne (Note: Patricksbourne held from Odo of Bayeux 1086)	Kent	Richard FitzWilliam	1086
Peak	Derbyshire	William I Peverel	1086
Pevensey	Sussex	Gilbert I de l'Aigle	1106–1114
Plympton	Devon	Richard I de Reviers	1087–1107
Pontefract	Yorkshire	Ilbert I de Lacy	1086
Rayleigh	Essex	Swain of Essex	1086
Richmond	Yorkshire	Alan Rufus	1086
Rothersthorpe	Northamptonshire	Gunfrid de Cioches	1086
Skipton	Yorkshire	Robert de Rumilly	temp. William II
Stogursey (Stoke Courcy)	Somerset	William de Falaise	1086
Swanscombe	Kent	Helte (Note: Held from the Bishop of Bayeux)	1086
Tamworth	Staffordshire	Robert Dispensator	1086
Tarrant Keyneston	Dorset	Ralph de Kaines	temp. Henry I
Thirsk	Yorkshire	Robert de Mowbray	pre-1095
Tickhill	Yorkshire	Roger de Busli	1086
Topcliffe	Yorkshire	William I de Percy	1086
Tutbury	Staffordshire	Henry de Ferrers	1086
Wark	Northumberland	Walter Espec	temp. Henry I
Warter	Yorkshire	Geoffrey FitzPain	c. 1101
Whalton	Northumberland	Walter FitzWilliam	pre-1161
Witham	Essex	Eustace II, Count of Boulogne	1086
Wrinstead (Note: Wrinstead: now represented by Wrinstead Court, c. 11 miles NW of Ashford, Kent)	Kent	William Peverel	post-1088

Source, unless otherwise stated: Sanders (1960), pp. 103–151

== Others ==
- Honour of Carisbrooke
- Feudal barony of Gloucester
- Honour of Saint Valery
- Honour of Pontefract

== Later establishments ==
- Honour of Aumâle
- Honour of Clitheroe
- Honour of Grafton

== See also ==
- Barony (county division)
- Feudalism
- List of baronies in the peerages of the British Isles
- Scottish feudal barony
- Irish feudal barony
- Barony (Ireland)
- List of baronies of Ireland
- List of Marcher lordships
- Tenant-in-chief
- Land tenure
- Land tenure in England
- Feudal baronies in Devonshire
- Mandala (political model)

== Sources ==
- Douglas, David C. & Greenaway, George W., (eds.), English Historical Documents 1042–1189, London, 1959. Part IV, Land & People, C, Anglo-Norman Feudalism, pp. 895–944
- Sanders, Ivor John (1960). English Baronies: A Study of Their Origin and Descent, 1086-1327. Oxford: Clarendon Press.
