= Devon Domesday Book tenants-in-chief =

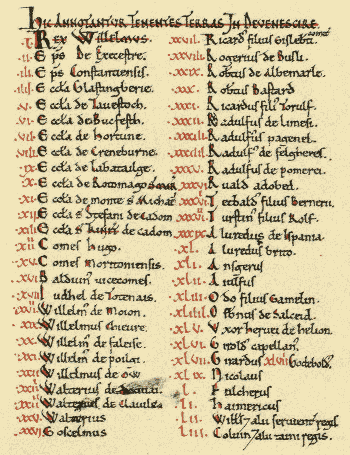
HIC ANNOTANTUR TENENTES TERRAS IN DEVENESCIRE ("Here are noted (those) holding lands in Devonshire"). Detail from Domesday Book, list forming part of first page of king's holdings. There are 53 entries, including the first entry for the king himself: I Rex Willelmus II Ep(iscopu)s de Execestre III Ep(iscopu)s Constantiensis IIII Eccl(esi)a Glastingberie V Eccl(esi)a de Tavestoch VI Eccl(esi)a de Bucfesth VII Eccl(esi)a de Hortune VIII Eccl(esi)a de Creneburne IX Eccl(esi)a de Labatailge X Eccl(esi)a de Rotomago S(ancta) Mar(ia) XI Eccl(esi)a de Monte S(ancto) Michael XII Eccl(esi)a S(ancti) Stefani de Cadom XIII Eccl(esi)a S(ancti) Trinit(atis) de Cadom XIIII Comes Hugo XV Comes Moritoniensis XVI Balduin(us) Vicecomes XVII Judhel de Totenais XVIII Willelm(us) de Moion XIX Willelmus Cievre XX Willelm(us) de Faleise XXI Willelm (us) de Poilgi XXII Willelmus de Ow XXIII Walterius de Douuai XXIIII Walterius de Clavile XXV Walterius XXVI Goscelmus XXVII Ricard(us) filius Gisleb(er)ti comitis XXVIII Rogerius de Busli XXIX Rob(er)tus de Albemarle XXX Rob(er)tus Bastard XXXI Ricardus fili(us) Torulf XXXII Radulfus de Limesi XXXIII Radulf(us) Pagenel XXXIIIIRadulf(us) de Felgheres XXXV Radulfus de Pomerei XXXVI Ruald Adobed XXXVII Tetbald(us) filius Bernerii XXXVIII Turstin(us) filius Rolf XXXIX Aluredus de Ispania XL Aluredus brito XLI Ansgerus XLII Aiulfus XLIII Odo filius Gamelin XLIIII Osb(er)nus de Salceid XLV Uxor Hervei de Helion XLVI Girold(us) capellan(anus) XLVII Girardus XLVIII Godebold(us) XLIX Nicolaus Balistarius L Fulcherus LI Haimericus LII Will(elmu)s et alii servient(es) regis LIII Coluin et alii taini regis

The Domesday Book of 1086 lists in the following order the tenants-in-chief in Devonshire of King William the Conqueror:

- Osbern FitzOsbern (died 1103), Bishop of Exeter
- Geoffrey de Montbray (died 1093), Bishop of Coutances
- Glastonbury Church, Somerset
- Tavistock Church, Devon
- Buckfast Church, Devon
- Horton Church, Dorset
- Cranborne Church, Dorset
- Battle Church, Sussex
- St Mary's Church, Rouen, Normandy
- Mont Saint-Michel Church, Normandy
- St Stephen's Church, Caen, Normandy
- Holy Trinity Church, Caen
- Hugh d'Avranches, 1st Earl of Chester (died 1101)
- Robert, Count of Mortain (died 1090), half-brother of the king
- Baldwin de Moels (died 1090), Sheriff of Devon, feudal baron of Okehampton,
- Juhel de Totnes (died 1123/30), feudal baron of Totnes, Devon
- Serlo de Burci Feudal barony of Blagdon, Winterstoke, Somerset
- William de Mohun (died post 1090), feudal baron of Dunster, Somerset
- William Cheever, (Latinised to Capra, "she-goat"), feudal baron of Bradninch, Devon. He was brother of Ralph de Pomeroy (see below), feudal baron of Berry Pomeroy Devon
- William de Falaise, feudal baron of Stogursey, Somerset
- William de Poilley, whose lands later formed part of the Feudal barony of Plympton
- William II, Count of Eu (died 1097)
- Walter of Douai (died c. 1107), Feudal baron of Bampton, Devon
- Walter de Claville, brother of Gotshelm; his lands later formed part of the Feudal barony of Gloucester
- Gotshelm, brother of Walter de Claville; his lands later formed part of the Feudal barony of Gloucester
- Richard fitz Gilbert (died c. 1090), elder brother of Baldwin de Moels, Sheriff of Devon, feudal baron of Okehampton,
- Roger de Busli (died c. 1099)
- Robert of Aumale (Latinised to de Albemarle); his lands later formed part of the Feudal barony of Plympton
- Robert Bastard, whose lands later formed part of the Feudal barony of Plympton
- Richard Fitz Turold (died post 1103-6) (alias fitzThorold, fitzTurolf), whose lands later formed part of the Feudal barony of Cardinham, Cornwall
- Ralph de Limesy, most of his Devon manors passed to the Feudal barony of Bradninch
- Ralph Pagnell
- Ralph de Feugeres
- Ralph de Pomeroy, feudal baron of Berry Pomeroy, brother of William Cheever, feudal baron of Bradninch
- Roald Dubbed, whose lands later formed part of the Feudal barony of Plympton
- Theobald FitzBerner, whose lands later formed part of the Feudal barony of Great Torrington. He was the father-in-law of Odo FitzGamelin
- Turstin FitzRolf, feudal baron of North Cadbury, Somerset
- Alfred of Spain
- Alfred the Breton
- Ansger
- Aiulf
- Odo FitzGamelin, son-in-law of Theobald FitzBerner. His lands later formed part of the Feudal barony of Great Torrington.
- Osbern of Sacey
- The wife of Hervey of Hellean
- Gerald the Chaplain
- Gerard
- Godbold
- Nicholas the Bowman (or "Nicholas the Gunner")
- Fulchere ("Fulchere the Bowman"), most of his lands later became part of the feudal barony of Plympton
- Haimeric
- King's Servants
- King's Thanes

== See also ==
- Cornwall Domesday Book tenants-in-chief

== Sources ==
- Thorn, Caroline & Frank, (eds.) Domesday Book, (Morris, John, gen. ed.) Vol. 9, Devon, Parts 1 & 2, Phillimore Press, Chichester, 1985, part 1, List of Landholders in Devon
- Sanders, I. J. English Baronies: a Study of their Origin and Descent 1086-1327, Oxford, 1960
