= Ash, Braunton =

Historic estate in Devon, England

Coordinates: 51.1158°N 4.1284°W

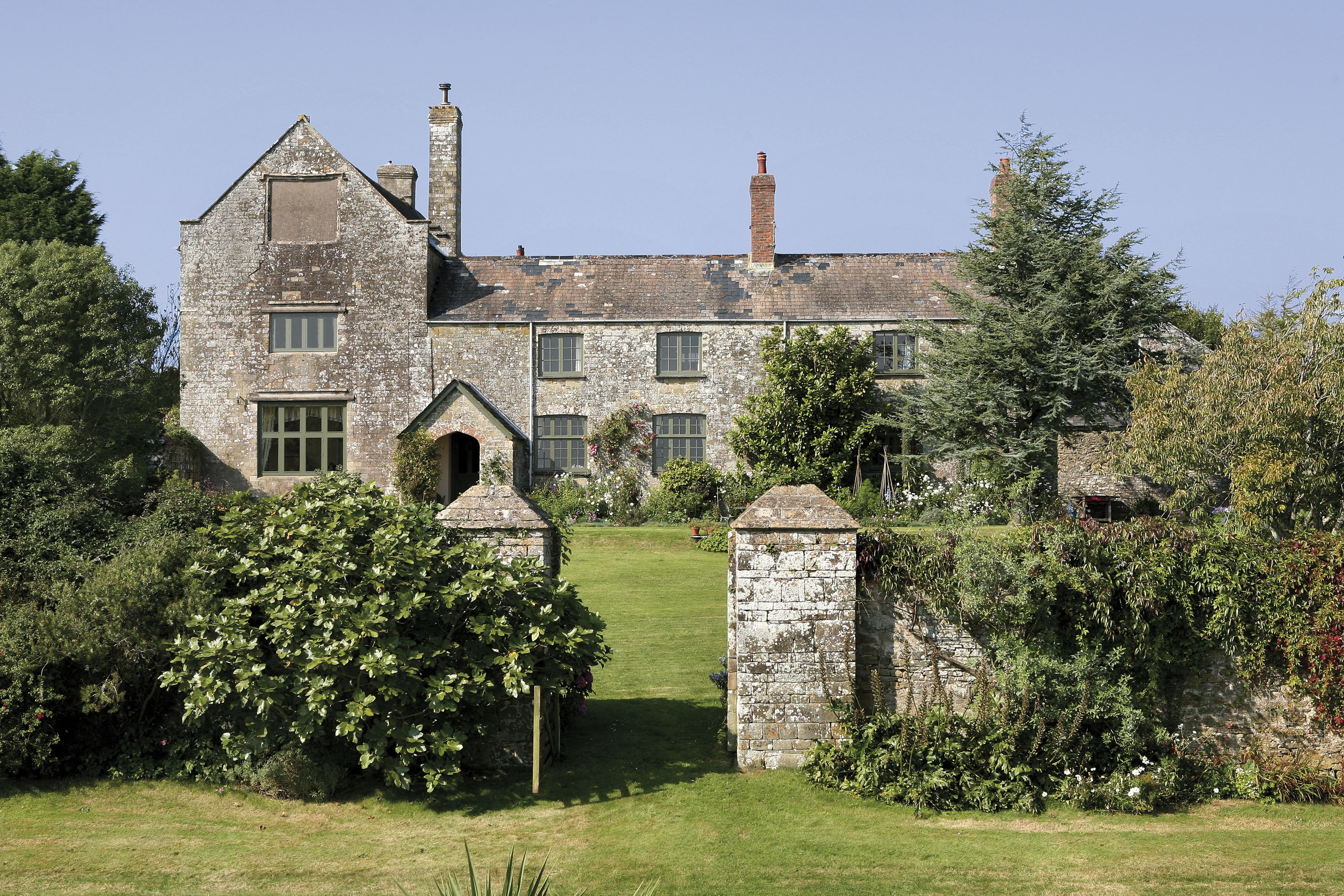
Ash Barton

Ash in the parish of Braunton in North Devon is a historic estate listed in the Domesday Book. The present mansion, known as The Ash Barton estate is a Grade II* listed building.

== History ==
=== Descent ===
==== Anglo-Saxons ====
In AD 973 Edgar the Peaceful repossessed Braunton for the Crown through an exchange with Glastonbury Abbey, thus retrieving a strategically important estate at the head of a major estuary. Susan Pearce conjectures that the King then placed a number of his thegns here providing each with a landholding which became the small estates which form an arc around Braunton to the north and east. These appear to have been members of three manors within the parish of Braunton, later known as Braunton Dean, Braunton Abbot and Braunton Gorges, of which latter manor Ash was part. Ash was recorded in the Domesday Book of 1086 as ESSA, which states that immediately before the Norman Conquest of 1066 it was held by a certain Alward.

==== Normans ====
===== Cheever =====
Ash was amongst many estates granted by William the Conqueror to William Cheever (Latinised to Capra, "she-goat", from French chèvre). It is listed in Domesday Book as the 14th of his 46 landholdings in Devon. His lands later formed the feudal barony of Bradninch. William Cheever's tenant at Ash was a certain Ralph.

===== Earl of Cornwall =====
Somewhat later Ash was apparently granted in-chief to Reginald, Earl of Cornwall.

==== Fleming ====
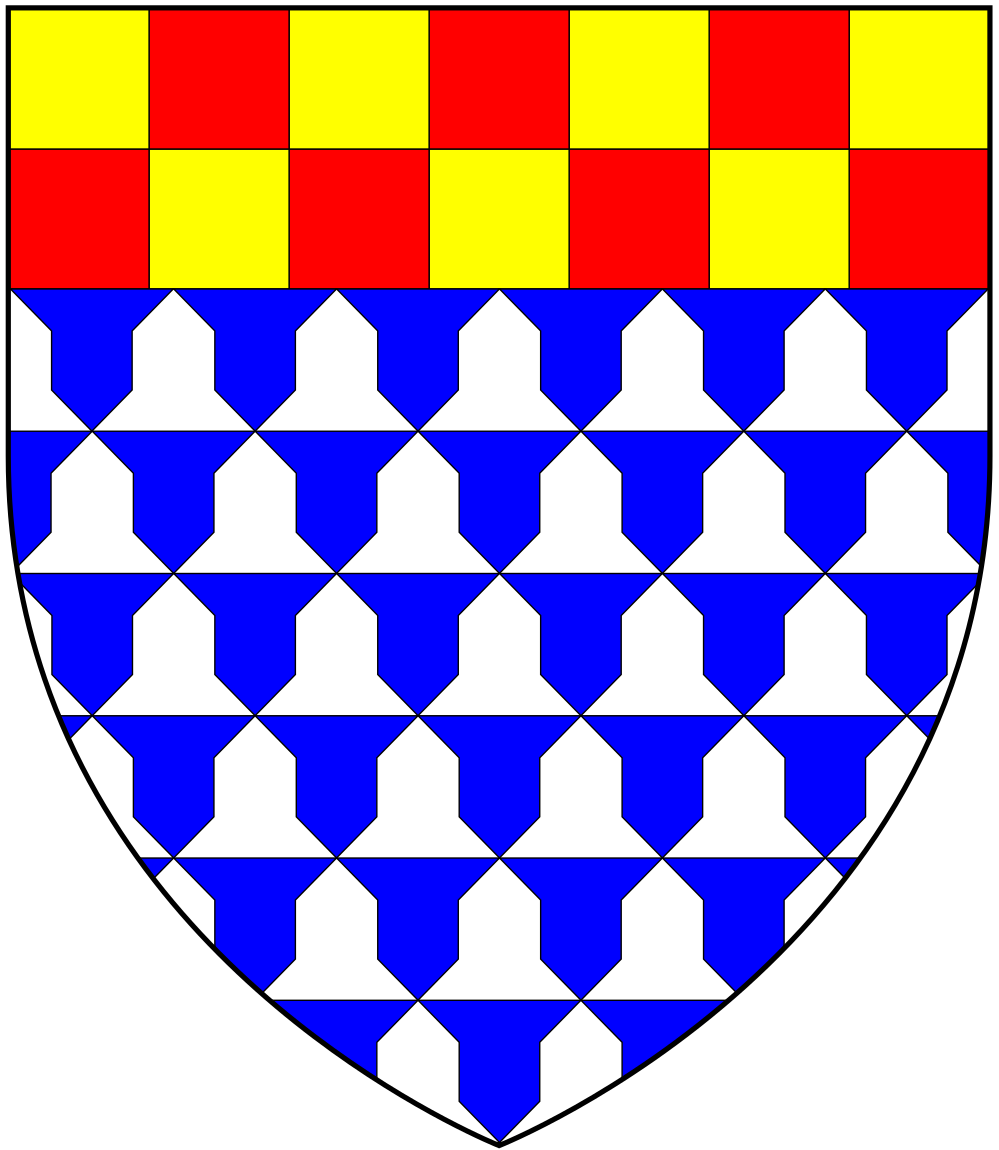
Arms of Fleming, Baron Slane: Vair, a chief chequy or and gules These are by co-incidence the inverse of the arms of Chichester of Raleigh, later lords of the manor of Bratton Fleming, and possibly also of Ash (see below)

From Reginald, Earl of Cornwall, as recorded in the Cartae Baronum of 1166, Ash was held as half a knight's fee by Erchenbold, son of Simon de Flandrensis (Latin for "from Flanders/The Fleming"). The Fleming family held several estates in Devon (including Alverdiscott and Croyde) and was seated at nearby Bratton (later "Bratton Fleming"), in Braunton hundred, of which Erchenbald I (of Flanders) was the Domesday Book tenant of Robert, Count of Mortain, whose lands later became the feudal barony of Launceston, later the Duchy of Cornwall. In 1219 two thirds of the estate, by then for reason unknown called Ash Rogus (but see Holcombe Rogus), was given away as a marriage portion, but was bought back in 1229 by Erchenbald the Fleming.

The overlord of the Flemings at Ash appears to have changed from the feudal barony of Launceston back to the feudal barony of Bradninch as the 13th century Book of Fees records the tenant of Esse, Hakeston (Haxton in Bratton Fleming parish) and Duntingthon (Benton in Bratton Fleming) as "Baldwin le Fleming", holding from the barony of Bradninch.

Ash Rogus then descended in its entirety through the Fleming family until 1457 and the death of Christopher Fleming without male children.

==== Bellew ====
Arms of Bellew: Sable fretty or

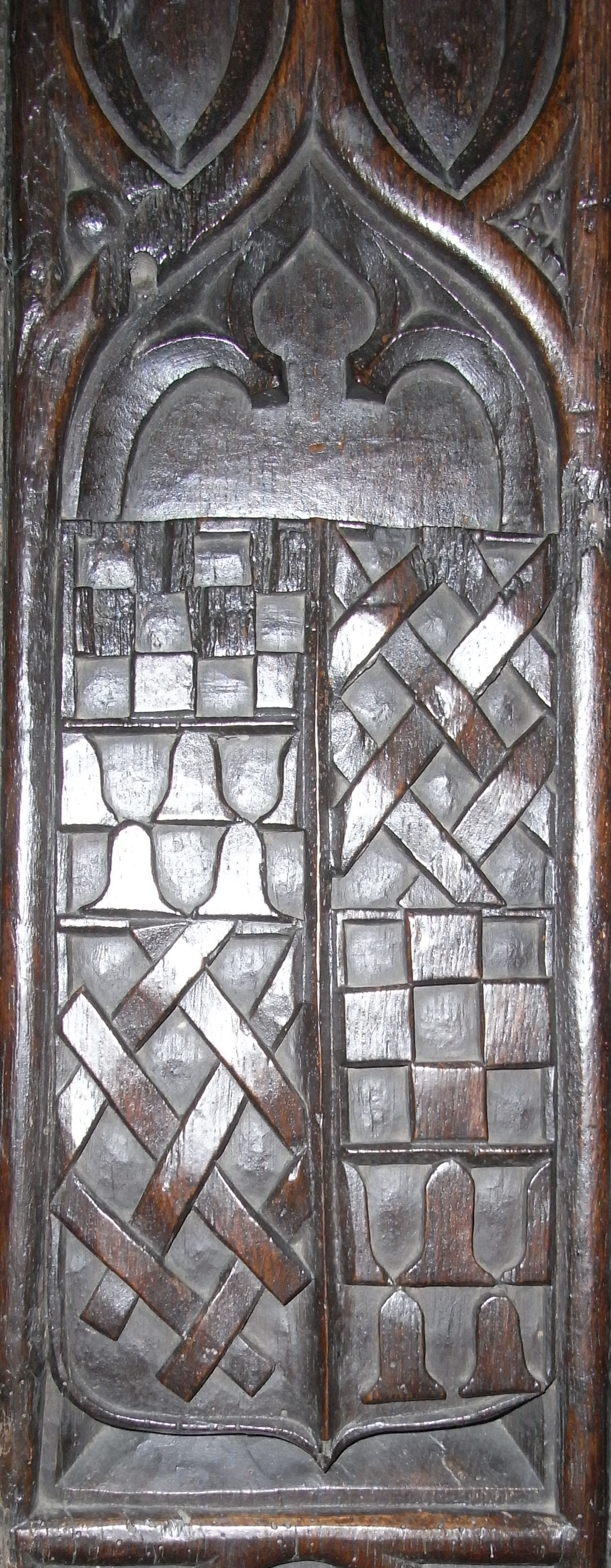
Arms of Fleming quartering Bellew, bench-end, St. Branock's Church, Braunton

In 1457 following the death unmarried and without children of Christopher Fleming, 5th Baron Slane (son of John Fleming (who predeceased his father Sir Christopher Fleming, 4th Baron) by his wife Amy Rochfort), his two sisters became his co-heirs to his Devon estates, the Irish estates passing under tail-male to David Fleming, uncle of the half blood to the fifth and last Christopher Lord le Fleming; which David was summoned to, and sat in the parliament of King Edward the Fourth, by the title of Lord David Fleming, Baron of Slane, and thus became a peer by a new writ of creation. The title Baron Slane (or le Fleming) of the 1st creation went into abeyance between the 5th Baron's two sisters, and was still in abeyance in 1835 when a petition for the peerage was heard in the House of Lords (the "Slane Peerage case"). The two sisters and co-heiresses were:

- Amy Fleming, heiress of Ash, who married John Bellewe
- Anne Fleming, heiress of Bratton Fleming, who married Walter Dillon

In 1472 James Fleming was in dispute with John and Patrick Bellewe over rents in Ash Rogus and Putsborough. According to Westcote at the end of the 16th century the Bellewes of Ash Rogus had also become lords of the manor of Braunton Gorges. In the Devon Muster Roll of 1569 the liability of William Bellew, Esquire, to provide arms was assessed on his holdings in land at £100-200, the highest assessment in the parish of Braunton, and in the Subsidy Roll of 1581 Richard Bellew was assessed as liable to pay £40 in tax, again, the highest in the parish.

===== Bellew monument =====
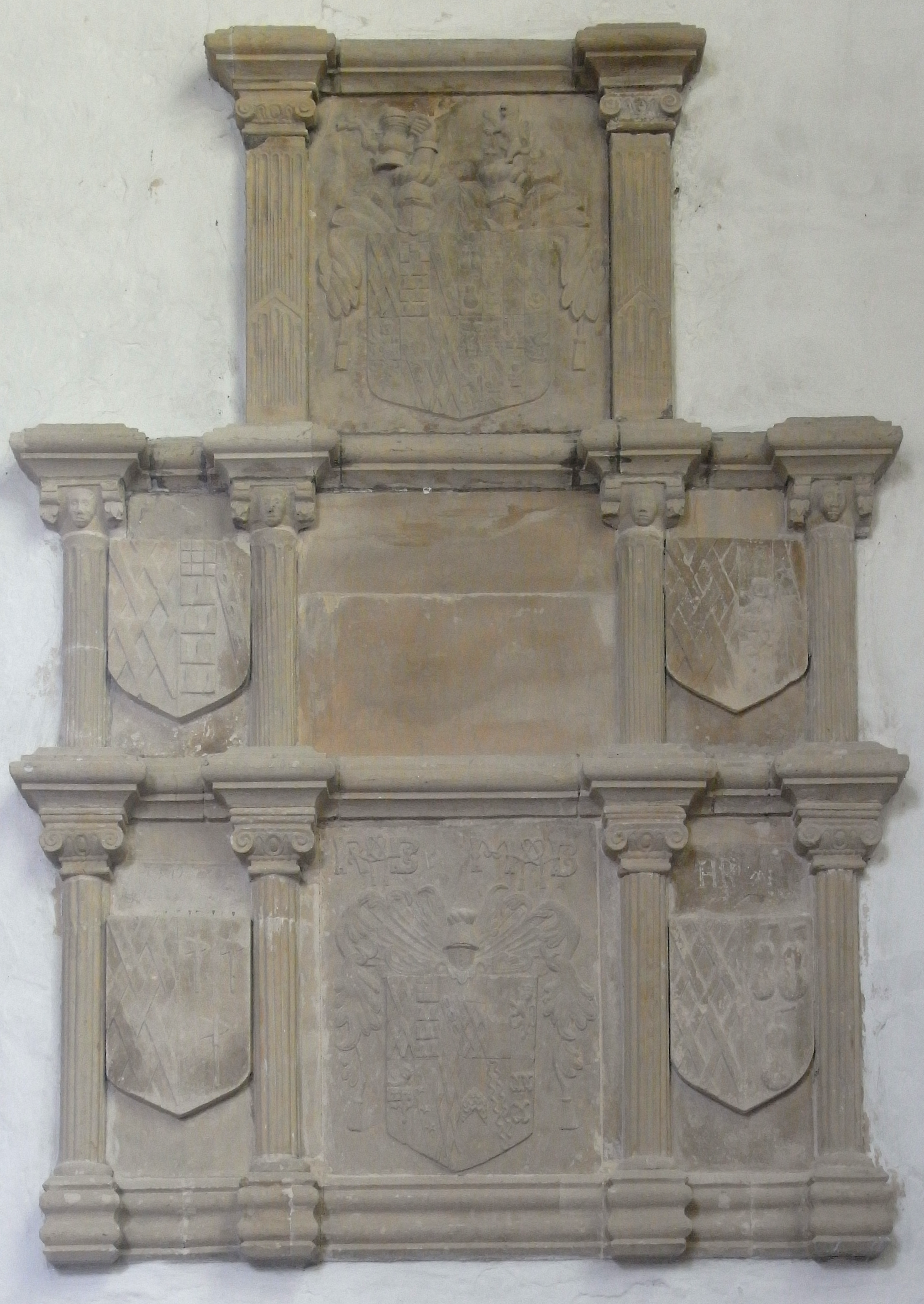
16th century mural monument of Richard Bellew of Ash and his wife Margaret St Ledger of Annery in Braunton Church

A late 16th century stone heraldic mural monument of Richard Bellew of Ash survives in Braunton Church, on the south aisle wall. It is said to have been taken from the former chapel at Ash. It is a triptych split by use of superimposed orders of short Ionic columns into three rows and seven compartments. Within six of the compartments are escutcheons with heraldry sculpted in relief. The painted inscription and all painted colouring have been lost. It shows Richard's own shield at bottom centre, that of his father at top and on both sides in total 4 further shields of his father (again), grandfather, great-grandfather and great-great-grandfather.

====== Heraldry ======
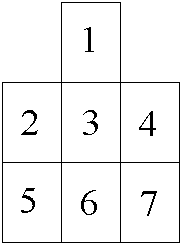
Key to heraldry on Bellew monument, Braunton Church

The arms shown on the monument are as follows:

- Compartment 1: Arms of William Bellew (died 1578)(father of Richard) impaling paternal arms of his wife Anne Stucley (died 1567), daughter of Sir Hugh Stucley (1496–1559) of Affeton. Above are the crests of Bellew (dexter): An arm holding a ewer of water (canting crest from French Belle-eau, "beautiful water") and Stucley (dexter): A lion rampant.
  - Bellew, quarterly of 6:
    - 1st:Bellew: Sable fretty or;
    - 2nd:Fleming, for John Fleming of Bratton Fleming and Ash, one of whose two daughters and co-heiresses, Anne Fleming, married John Bellew (descended from the Bellews of Bellewstown, County Meath, Ireland,) father of Patrick Bellew. Vair, a chief chequy or and gules
    - 3rd:Ferrers, for Martin Ferrers of Bere Ferrers one of whose three daughters and co-heiresses, Leva Ferrers, married Sir Christopher Fleming, 3rd Baron of Slane:Or, on a bend sable three horseshoes argent
    - 4th Colebrooke (alias Kilrington) of Colebrooke in the parish of Bradninch, for William Colebrooke of Lorywell, Devon, whose daughter and heiress, Alice Colebrooke, married Henry Bellew of Alverdiscott and Ash: Argent, a lion rampant gules over all on a fess sable three crosslets fitchy argent
    - 5th: Calley (alias Cayley) of Chimlegh, Devon, for Robert Cayley whose daughter and heiress Joane Cayley married William Colebrooke father of Alice: Quarterly argent and sable on a bend gules three mullets argent
    - 6th: Bellew
  - Stucley, quarterly of 8:
    - 1st: Azure, three pears pendant or (Stucley)
    - 2nd: Three fleurs-de-lys
    - 3rd: A chevron...
    - 4th: A chevron engrailed between three roses
    - 5th: Gules, three lions rampant guardant or (FitzRoger))
    - 6th: Argent, a chevron engrailed between three fleurs-de-lys sable (de Affeton)
    - 7th: Gules crusily fitchee or, three demi-woodmen men holding clubs or (Wood of Binley)
    - 8th: A pelican in her piety
- Compartment 2: Arms of John Bellew (great-great-grandfather of Richard). Bellew impaling Fleming and Ferrers
- Compartment 3: Tablet with inscription erased
- Compartment 4:Arms of Henry Bellew (grandfather of Richard) impaling Colebrooke and Calley
- Compartment 5: Arms of Patrick Bellew (great-grandfather of Richard) impaling Dennis, for John Dennis of Orleigh whose daughter Anne Dennis married Patrick Bellew: Azure, three Danish battle-axes or
- Compartment 6: Arms of Richard Bellew (6 quarters) impaling St Leger (6 quarters), for Sir John St Leger of Annery, Monkleigh whose daughter Margaret St Leger married Richard Bellew. Above the escutcheon are the initials "RB" (dexter) and "MB" (sinister)
  - Bellew, quarterly of 6, as in escutcheon of his father at top of monument, compartment 1

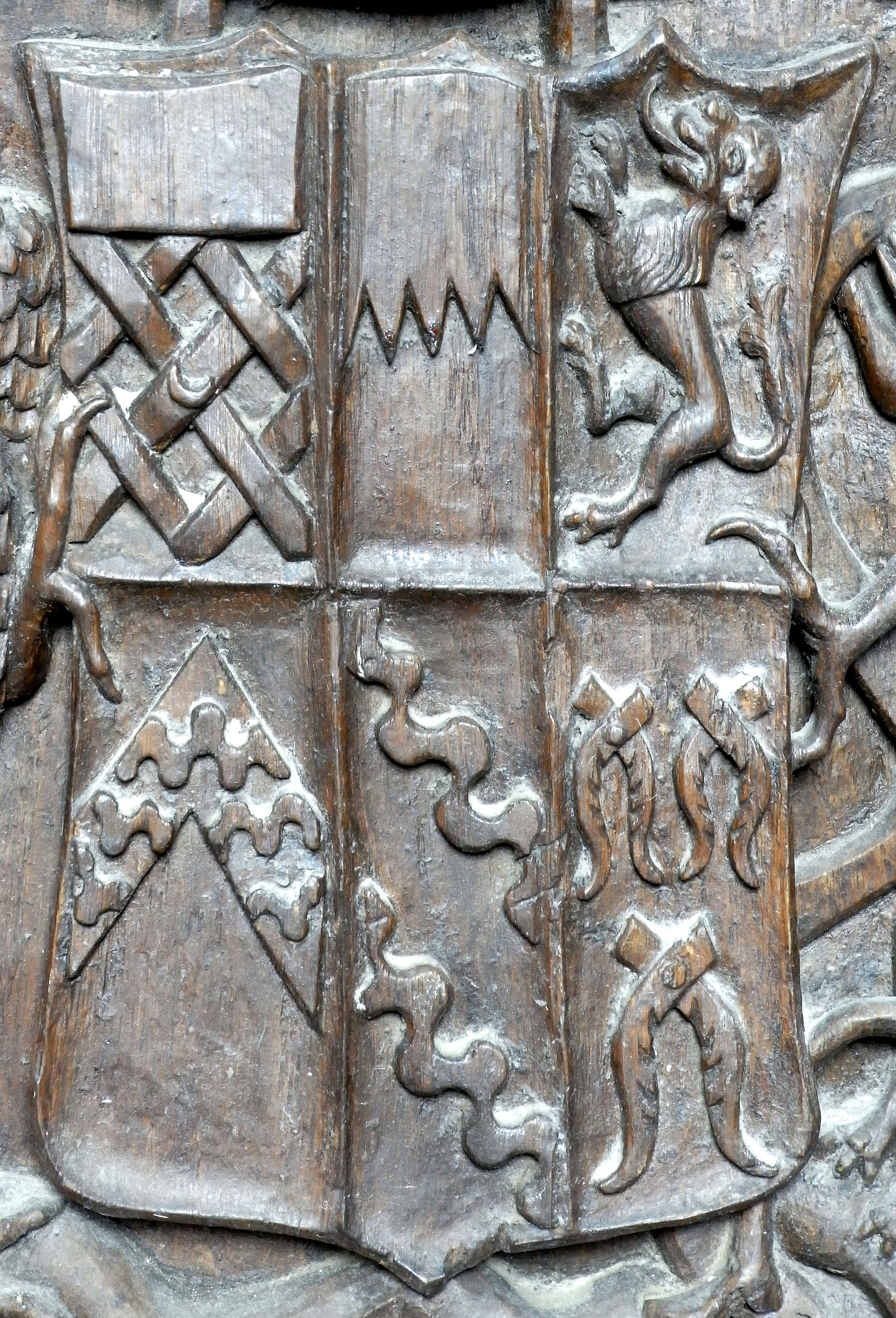
16th century bench end in Monkleigh Church showing arms of St Leger family of Annery, with same six quarterings as in Braunton Church

  - St Leger (which family shared a common descent with Bourchier from the FitzWarins, feudal barons of Bampton, and the Hankfords and Stapledons) quarterly of 6:
    - 1st:St Leger of Annery: Azure fretty argent, a chief or
    - 2nd:FitzWarin, feudal baron of Bampton: Quarterly per fess indented argent and gules
    - 3rd: A lion rampant crowned (possibly Turberville)
    - 4th: Hankford of Annery, for Richard Hankford (c. 1397 – 1431) of Annery, feudal baron of Bampton: Sable, a chevron barry undee argent and gules
    - 5th: Stapledon, for Stapledon of Annery: Argent, two bends undee sable (as visible on monument of Walter Stapledon, Bishop of Exeter in Exeter Cathedral
    - 6th: Argent, three barnacles gules tied sable (Donet of Sileham, Rainham, Kent)
- Compartment 7: Arms of Bellew impaling Stucley, for father of Richard Bellew, as at top but with no quarterings.

==== Bourchier ====
Arms of Bourchier, Earls of Bath: Argent, a cross engrailed gules between four water bougets sable

The Bellew family sold Ash in the 16th century to the Bourchier family of Tawstock, Earls of Bath, feudal barons of Bampton, Devon. They were large landowners and amongst their holdings was the estate of Beare in the parish of Braunton. A monumental brass to Elizabeth Bourchier (died 1548) survives in Braunton Church. She was a daughter of John Bourchier, 1st Earl of Bath and was the wife of Edward Chichester (died 1522) of Raleigh in the nearby parish of Pilton.

Ash may have been tenanted during Bourchier ownership. A document of 1695 records that Richard Peard and others farmed the rents on half of "one chief messuage or barton called Ashrogus and other lands in the parish of Braunton".

===== Monument to Elizabeth Bourchier =====
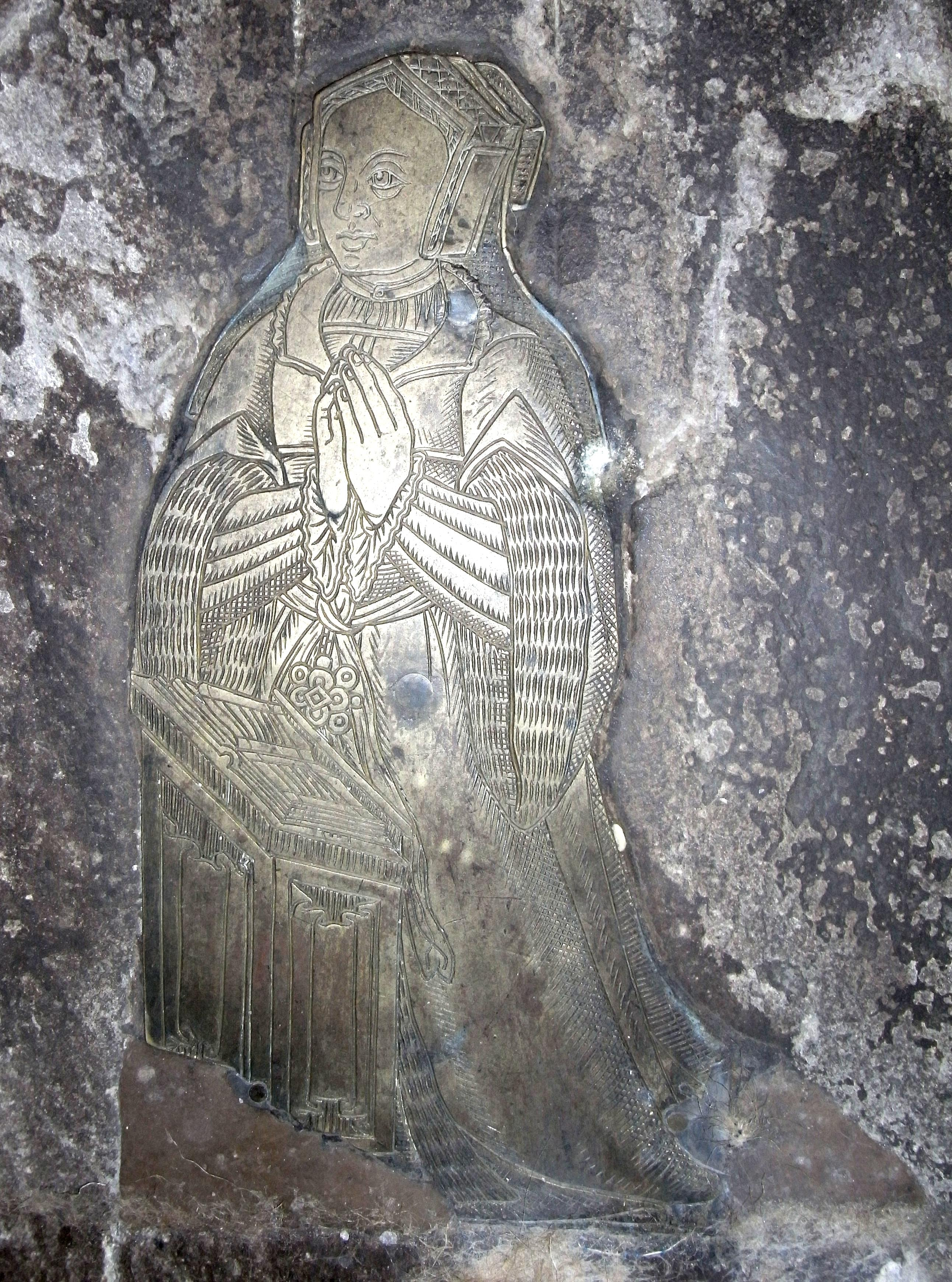
Monumental brass to Elizabeth Bourchier (died 1548), Braunton Church

A small monumental brass (c. one ft high) survives in St Brannock's Church, Braunton, of Lady Elizabeth Bourchier (died 1548), daughter of John Bourchier, 1st Earl of Bath & wife of Edward Chichester (died 1522) of Raleigh, Pilton. She kneels at prayer before a prie dieu on which is an open book. The Gothic text inscription underneath is as follows:

"Here lyethe Lady Elyzabethe Bowcer daughter of John Erle of Bathe & sumtyme wyffe to Edwarde Chechester Esquyer the whyche Elyzabethe decessyd the XXXIIIth day of August in the yere of O_r Lorde God M Vc (i.e. 5*c) XLVIII apon whose soule God have m(er)cy".

The brass is a palimpsest, engraved on the reverse is the face of a knight, with helmet unfinished, apparently containing an artistic error which led to its abandonment & reuse.

==== Beare ====
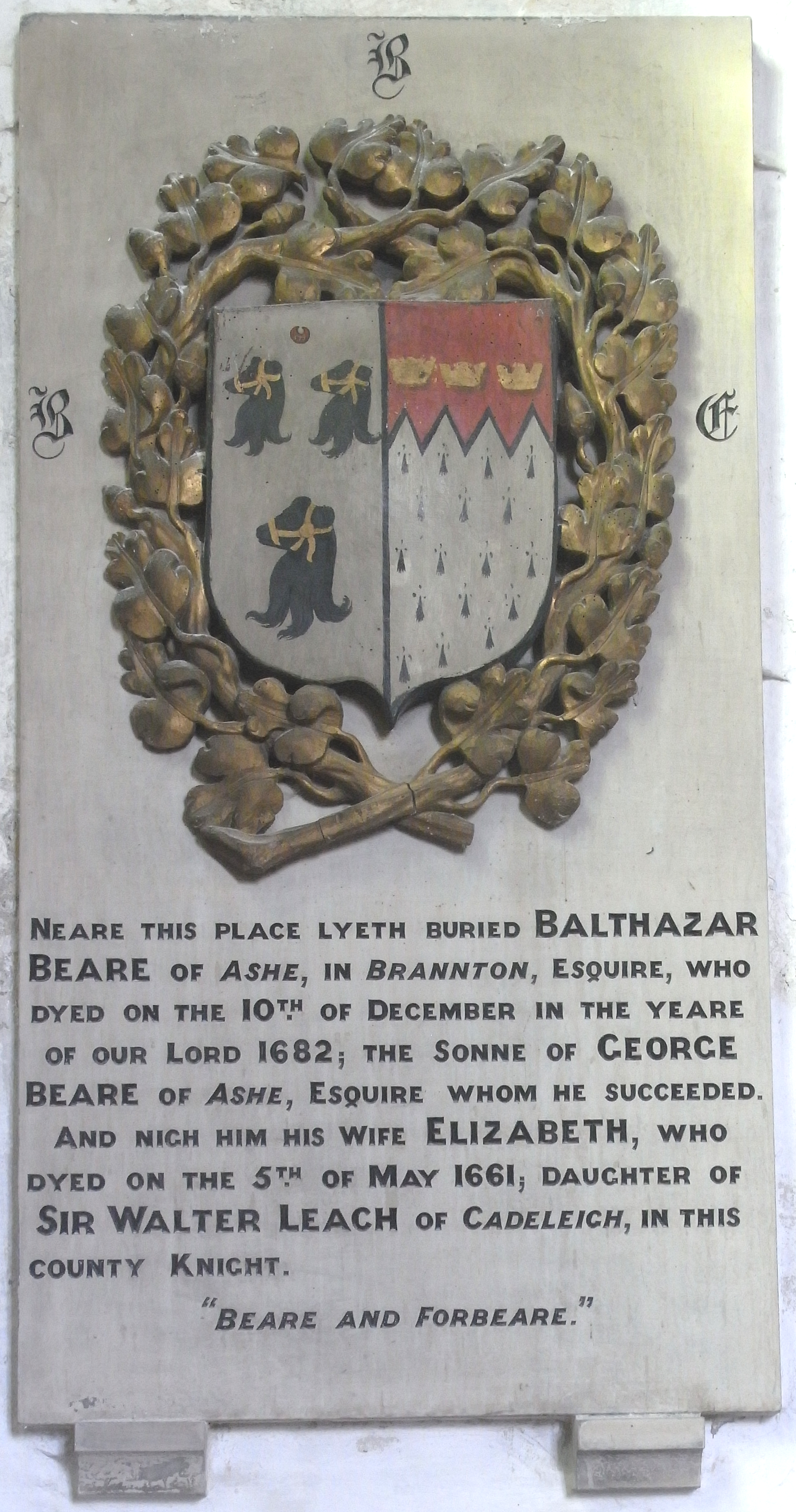
Mural monument to Balthazar Beare (1616–1682) of Ash, Braunton Church

Ash is said by Polwhele to have passed to a junior branch of the family of Beare, lords of the manor of Huntsham. The family of Beare (or "Bere") is ancient and the earliest member recorded is "Baldwin de Bere, lord of Bere" during the reign of King Stephen (1135–1154). They remained at the estate of "Bere" for several generations but later moved to the manor of Huntsham which had been inherited by marriage. The location of "Bere" is uncertain, it may have been near Ash if it was the estate of Beare in the parish of Braunton described by Risdon (died 1640) as "the ancient dwelling of Richard de Charteray", which later descended via Baron FitzWarin to the Bourchiers, Earls of Bath. It is also known as "Bear Charter". A mural monument survives in Braunton Church in memory of Balthazar Beare (1616–1682) inscribed as follows:

"Neare this place lyeth buried Balthazar Beare of Ashe in Brannton, Esquire, who dyed on the 10th of December in the yeare of our Lord 1682; the sonne of George Beare of Ashe, Esquire, whom he succeeded. And nigh him his wife Elizabeth, who dyed on the 5th of May 1661, daughter of Sir Walter Leach of Cadeleigh in this county, knight. Beare and Forebeare"

Above within a chaplet is an escutcheon showing the arms of Beare: Argent, three bear's heads and necks erased sable muzzled or, with a crescent for the difference of a second son, impaling Leach, lords of the manor of Cadeleigh: Ermine, on a chief indented gules three ducal coronets or. Sir Walter Leach (1599-pre-1637) was the eldest surviving son and heir of Sir Simon Leach (1567–1638), of Cadeleigh, Sheriff of Devon in 1624. George Beare was also seated at the estate of Frankmarsh, near Barnstaple and was a barrister of the Middle Temple and a judge of oyer and terminer during the reign of King Charles I.

==== Chichester, Bury, Lamley ====
Ash is said by Polwhele to have passed via Beare to Chichester, Bury and Lamley, who may or may not have been tenants

==== Bassett ====
Arms of Basset: Barry wavy of six or and gules

Ash then became the property of the Bassett family of nearby Heanton Punchardon and Umberleigh, in possession from at least 1780. In 1822 Lysons recorded that it was the property of Joseph Davie Bassett of Watermouth Castle, and the tithe apportionment of 1840 recorded him as owner and Charles Dunn as occupier.

== Occupancy of the estate 1800–1939 ==
The Land Tax records indicate that in 1780, the Ash Barton Estate was occupied by Robert Dyer, tenant of Joseph Davie Bassett. He was succeeded in 1784 by Philip Scott who remained until 1803. Then followed by Thomas Dunn, then Charles Dunn who was recorded in the tithe apportionment of 1840. The Trade Directories for Devonshire from 1851 to 1939 state that Charles Dunn was followed by Henry Passmore, then Henry Alford, then John Nicholas Reed and just before World War II, the Bowden Brothers. All of these were farmers at Ash Barton.

== The chapel ==
A 16th century mural monument (see image above) to the Bellew family of Ash survives on the south wall of St Brannock's Church in Braunton and is said to have been taken from the old chapel at Ash. In the mid-19th century, the local historian Harding mentioned in his notes regarding Ash ‘an ancient chapel still standing’. Coulter says ‘the large, detached building to the rear of the main residence is thought by some to be the old chapel, but there is no particular evidence or architectural feature to support this.’ Although it would not be at all unusual for a high status residence at some distance from the parish church to have a private chapel, no licence for a chapel here has been found. Furthermore, despite local belief, the respondent to Dean Milles’ questionnaire of c. 1750 made no mention of any chapel here either extant or ruined. Harding's words are at present the only historic documentary reference, and so without more positive evidence, the question of a former chapel must remain open.

== Surroundings ==
The Ash Barton Estate lies beyond the boundary of the extensive area of long, narrow fields seen on the Braunton tithe map. These represent the engrossment and enclosure of the plough strips of medieval open field agriculture of which the Braunton Great Field is a rare surviving example. The system appears to have been bounded by Buttercombe Lane, which may represent a ‘transhumance’ route taking livestock to graze on the high ground of Fullabrook Down. To the south and east of Buttercombe Lane is an area of probably late medieval enclosure of what may have been the occasionally cultivated outfield. The Devon County Historic Landscape Characterisation survey describes the fields around Ash Barton as 15th- to 18th-century enclosures possibly based to an extent on medieval boundaries.

The occurrence of the term ‘Gratton’ in the names of two fields - tithe map numbers 1136 and 1138 - immediately to the east of the Ash Barton Estate may confirm this. The term is interpreted by Gover, Mawer and Stenton as ‘stubble field’, but it is so common across Devon that it seems to have greater and more permanent significance than the seasonal ‘arish’. More likely it is descriptive of the outfield onto which stock would be turned to graze in between brief periods of cultivation. This would suggest that the settlement at Ash was established when the infield-outfield system had fallen away, perhaps relatively late in the pre-Conquest period.

To the north west is a field numbered 1133 on the tithe map and called in the tithe apportionment ‘Lower Forches’. This belongs within a group of ‘Forches’ field names here centring on a small triangle of land beside Buttercombe Lane called ‘Forches Green’. Here in the medieval period would have stood the gallows.

== Today ==
The estate is now owned and operated as a multi-purpose self-catering venue for hire by the Daukes family including weddings, parties, family holidays and corporate gatherings. www.ashbarton.com
