= South Radworthy =

Hamlet in Devon, England

- Hamlet
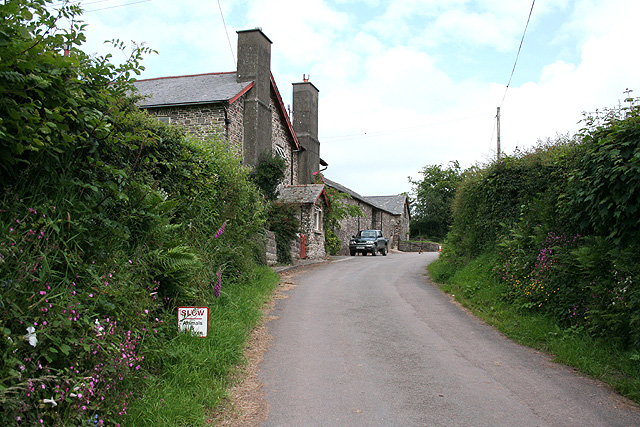
- Higher South Radway

- South Radworthy in Devon
- Coordinates: 51°4′46.03″N 3°47′18.07″W
- Country: United Kingdom
- County: Devon
- District: North Devon
- Parish: North Molton

South Radworthy is a hamlet in the civil parish of North Molton, in the North Devon District of the county of Devon, England. It is about 3 miles (5 km) to the north of the village of North Molton and about 15 miles (24 km) to the east of the town of Barnstaple. The hamlet sits on an unclassified road and is surrounded by woodland.

== Listed Buildings ==
South Radworthy Cottage is a pair of cottages in South Radworthy, which were given Grade II listed status on 24 November 1988. The earlier of the two cottages dates from the 17th Century, the other from the 19th Century.

== Domesday Book ==
Radworthy was situated in the hundred of South Molton, one of thirty two ancient administrative units of the county of Devon. RAORDIN ("Radworthy", including today's division of North and South) is listed in the Domesday Book of 1086 as the 19th of the 46 holdings of William Cheever, a Devon Domesday Book tenant-in-chief, who held it in demesne. The Domesday Book entry for RAORDIN stated a population of 8 villagers and 4 slaves in 1086. It was then valued at 60 shillings for tax purposes. The land value in 1099 had been only 15 shillings. It had been held immediately prior to the Norman Conquest of 1066 by "Alward son of Toki". The land at RAORDIN (North and South Radworthy) was sufficient for three ploughs. There was in addition 1 acre of meadow, 40 acres of pasture and woodland measuring 1 league long and 1 furlong wide. The livestock present in 1086 were 10 cattle, 4 pigs and 50 sheep.
