= Canonsleigh Abbey =

Augustinian priory in Devon, England

Coordinates: 50°56′53″N 3°19′46″W

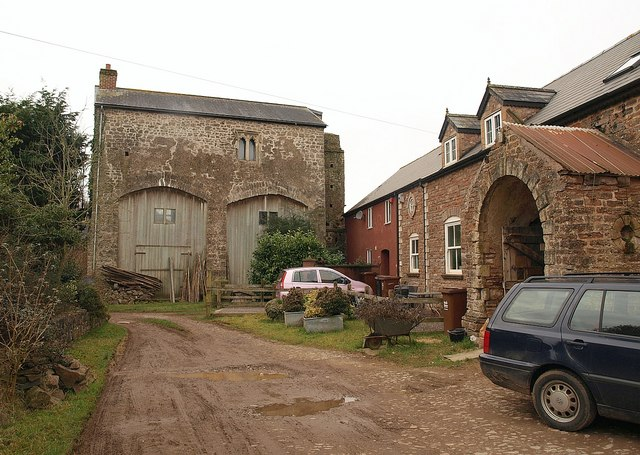
Gatehouse of Canonsleigh Abbey at left

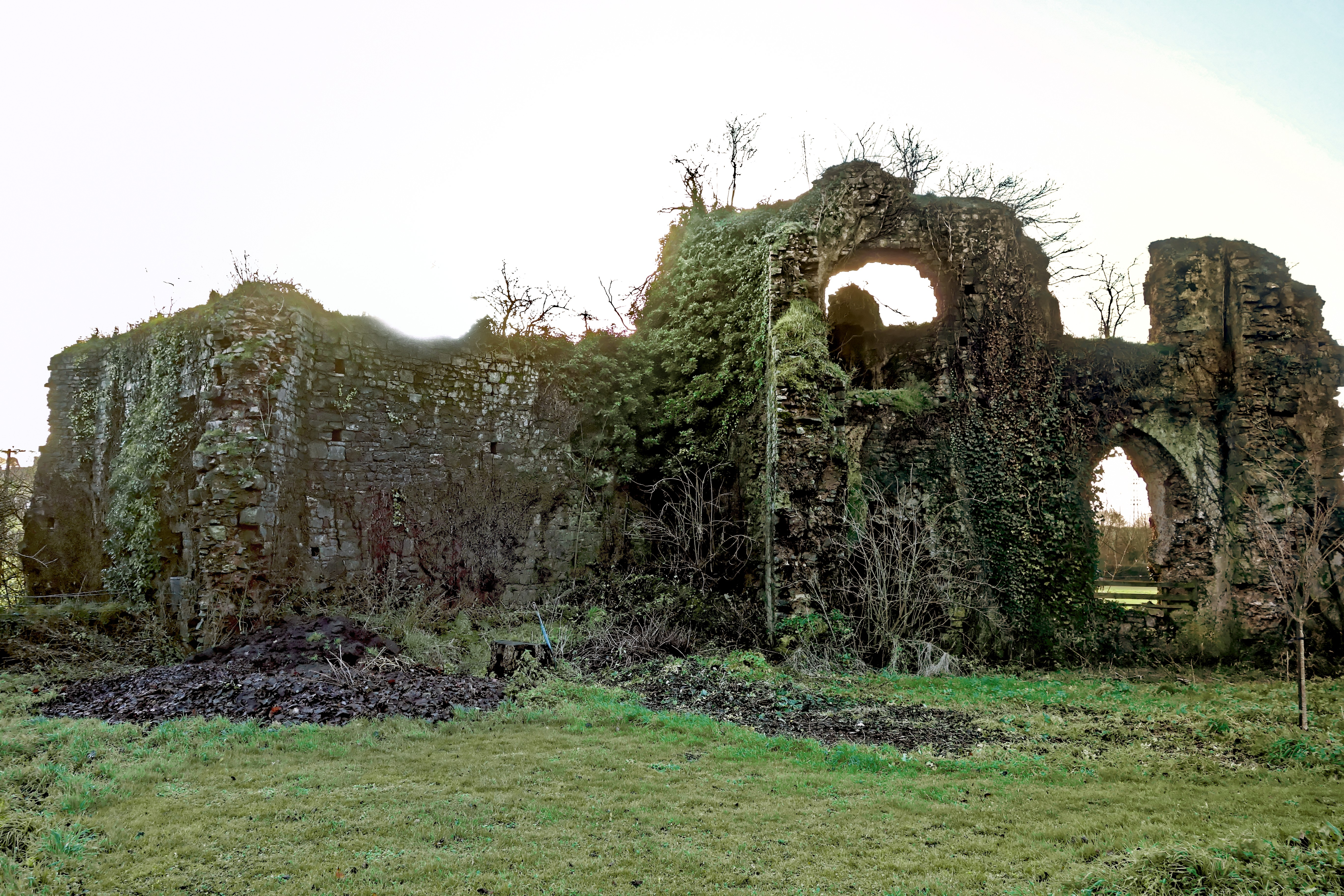
Canonsleigh Abbey, ruins

Canonsleigh Abbey was an Augustinian priory at Canonsleigh, in the parish of Burlescombe, Devon, England.

== History ==
It was founded in about 1170 by Walter de Claville, lord of the manor of Burlescombe, for the Augustinian canons regular as the Priory of the Blessed Virgin Mary and Saint John the Evangelist. He appears to have been a descendant of Walter I de Claville (floruit 1086), one of the 52 Devon Domesday Book tenants-in-chief of King William the Conqueror, who had 32 landholdings in Devon. The original Anglo-Saxon name of the site donated by Walter II, perhaps a sub-manor of Burlescombe, was "Leigh" (Domesday Book Leige), which after the foundation of the Abbey became known as "Canons' Leigh" and was Latinised by mediaeval scribes to Leigh Canonicorum (i.e. "Leigh of the canons"), now "Canonsleigh".

By 1284 the number of canons had declined to seven, and these were evicted in 1285 when the widow Maud de Lacy, Countess of Gloucester(d.1289), formerly the wife of Richard de Clare, 6th Earl of Gloucester (d.1262), refounded the establishment as a nunnery as the Abbey Church of the Blessed Virgin Mary, Saint John the Evangelist and Saint Etheldreda. In 1286 the abbess was granted licence to hold weekly markets. It was not especially wealthy. The number of historical records that survive for this establishment is not large which limits a full knowledge of its history. However recent research by Atkinson has added much to its known history.

Among the possessions of Canonsleigh Abbey was Netherton, Farway

The Abbey was suppressed in 1539 during the Dissolution of the Monasteries. Of its later history, in September 1546 Sir Richard Grenville (c.1495-1550), of Stowe, Cornwall and Bideford, and Roger Blewett of Holcombe Rogus paid nearly £1,170 for the manors of Canonsleigh in Burlescombe and Tynyell in Landulph.

The remains today consist of a small 15th-century gatehouse that has two large blocked arches and, to the east, further fragments that include ruined buildings, the remains of a reredorter (communal lavatories) and a possible south wall of the eastern range of buildings.

== Digital Media ==
A 360° digital view of Canonsleigh Abbey is available online, showing the surviving structures and surrounding landscape. The resource provides panoramic images of the site in its present state and illustrates its layout within the surrounding countryside.

The Historic England listing for Canonsleigh Abbey (List Entry Number 1003830) includes a link to the Missing Pieces Project. This initiative invites members of the public to contribute photographs, videos, or written accounts relating to listed heritage sites, in order to enrich and expand the official record. Contributions for Canonsleigh Abbey can be added via the "Comments and Photos" section of the list entry page, subject to moderation.

The Burlescombe tithe map and apportionment, viewable through the Devon Historic Environment Service, include the site of Canonsleigh Abbey within the nineteenth-century parish landscape. The map records land plots, ownership, and cultivation at the time of survey. The original tithe map is held at the Devon Heritage Centre.

A digitised edition of the abbey’s medieval records, the Cartulary of Canonsleigh Abbey, edited by Vera C. M. London (Devon & Cornwall Record Society, vol. 8, 1965), is also available online. It summarises charters, episcopal letters, and other documents relating to the abbey’s property and endowments.

== See also ==
- Abbeys and priories in England

== Sources ==
- New, Anthony. A Guide to the Abbeys of England and Wales. London: Constable, 1985, p. 104.
- Thorold, Henry. The Collins Guide to the Ruined Abbeys of England, Wales and Scotland. London: HarperCollins, 1985.
- Ordnance Survey. Monastic Britain: South Sheet, 2nd ed. Southampton: Ordnance Survey, 1954.
- London, Vera C. M. (ed.). The Cartulary of Canonsleigh Abbey (British Library, Harleian MS 3660). Devon & Cornwall Record Society, new series, vol. 8. Exeter: Devon & Cornwall Record Society, 1965. Available online at Boydell & Brewer.
