= Feudal baronies in Cornwall =

According to Sanders (1960) there were three English feudal baronies in Cornwall.

- Feudal barony of Launceston
- Feudal barony of Trematon
- Feudal barony of Cardinham

== See also ==
- Feudal baronies in Devonshire

== Sources ==
- Sanders, I.J. English Baronies: A Study of their Origin and Descent 1086–1327, Oxford, 1960
