= Cornwall Domesday Book tenants-in-chief =

List of those holding land in 1086 directly from the king

Beginning of Domesday Book for Cornwall; the first few lines list: I. Rex Willelmus; II. Episcopus de Execestre; III. Ecclesia de Tavestoch; IIII. Ecclesiae aliquorum sanctorum; V. Comes Moritoniensis; VI. Judhail de Totenais; VII. Goscelmus

The Domesday Book of 1086 lists in the following order the tenants-in-chief in Cornwall of King William the Conqueror:

- Osbern FitzOsbern (died 1103), Bishop of Exeter
- Tavistock Church, Devon
- The churches of various saints
  - St Michael's Church
  - Canons of St Stephen's
  - St Petroc's Church, Bodmin
  - Canons of St Achebran's
  - Canons of Probus
  - Canons of St Carantoc's
  - Canons of St Piran's
  - Canons of St Buryan's
  - Clergy of St Neot
- Robert, Count of Mortain (died 1090), half-brother of the king
- Juhel de Totnes (died 1123/30), feudal baron of Totnes
- Gotshelm, brother of Walter de Claville

== Sources ==
- Thorn, Caroline & Frank, (eds.) Domesday Book, (Morris, John, gen. ed.) Vol. 10, Cornwall, Chichester: Phillimore, 1979
