= Theobald FitzBerner =

Anglo-Norman landowner

Theobald FitzBerner (fl. 1086), (Theobald son of Berner, Tetbaldus Filius Bernerius) was an Anglo-Norman warrior and magnate; he was also one of the Devon Domesday Book tenants-in-chief of King William the Conqueror. The Domesday Book of 1086 lists him as the holder of 27 manors in Devon. His lands later formed part of the Feudal barony of Great Torrington, together with lands of his son-in-law Odo FitzGamelin
