= Ralph de Feugeres =

Anglo-Norman landholder

Ralph de Feugeres was a Norman knight and landowner who was a tenant-in-chief of estates in Devon after the Norman Conquest in 1066. His lands included the places now known as Adworthy and Afton.
