= Gotshelm =

Anglo-Norman nobleman

Gotshelm (floruit 1086) was an Anglo-Norman magnate and one of the 52 Devon Domesday Book tenants-in-chief of King William the Conqueror and was also a Cornwall Domesday Book tenant-in-chief. He is listed in the Domesday Book of 1086 as holding 28 estates or manors in Devon from the king. His brother was Walter de Claville (floruit 1086), also a Devon Domesday Book tenant-in-chief, who held 32 estates or manors in Devon from the king.

The Devonshire estates of both brothers later formed part of the feudal barony of Gloucester.

== Sources ==
- Thorn, Caroline & Frank, (eds.) Domesday Book, (Morris, John, gen. ed.) Vol. 9, Devon, Parts 1 & 2, Phillimore Press, Chichester, 1985
