= Walter de Claville =

Anglo-Norman magnate

Walter I de Claville (floruit 1086) (alias de Clarville and Latinised to de Clavilla) was an Anglo-Norman magnate and one of the 52 Devon Domesday Book tenants-in-chief of King William the Conqueror. He also held lands in Dorset. His Devonshire estates later formed part of the feudal barony of Gloucester.

== Origins ==
He is believed to have originated at any one of the manors called Claville or Clasville in the Duchy of Normandy, namely:

- Claville near Évreux
- Claville-Motteville near Yvetot
- Clasville near Cany Barville

His brother was Gotshelm, also a Devonshire tenant-in-chief, whose estates also later formed part of the feudal barony of Gloucester.

== Progeny ==
It is not known whether he married and left progeny, however Walter II de Claville (supposed by Cleveland to be his grandson) in about 1170 gave many of Walter I's former Domesday Book estates to a priory which he established on his estate of Leigh within his manor of Burlescombe, later known as Canons' Leigh Priory. Furthermore, several of his estates were held in the 13th century by a certain "William de Claville", as recorded in the Book of Fees (see list below).

== Succession ==
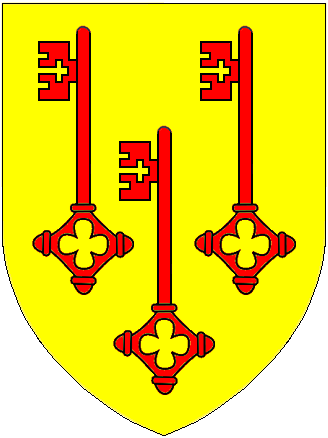
Arms of Clavell of Burlescombe: Or, three keys gules. These are canting arms derived from the Latin Clavis, a "key"

Sir William Pole (d.1635) gives the descent of the manor of Lomen Clavill, in the parish of Uplowman, as follows:

- Walter I de Claville, Domesday Book tenant
- William I de Claville
- Sir Walter II de Claville
- William II de Claville
- Sir Walter III de Claville
- Sir William III de Claville
- Sir Roger I de Claville, who according to Risdon died sans issue and was succeeded by his nephew William Clavell.
- John I de Claville (brother), heir of Roger I according to Pole. Apparently the John Clavell who according to Risdon was the grandson of William and died in the reign of King Edward III (1327–1377), having been "slain the next day after his marriage, coming from London to these parts, but his wife was conceived with child and brought a son, who had this (Lomen Clavell) and other his father's inheritance". Risdon however gives his son and heir as William.
- John II de Claville (son), according to Pole.
- John III de Claville
- William IV de Claville (son)
- William V de Claville (son), died without progeny

According to Sir William Pole (d.1635), the male line of the Clavell family was extinguished during the reign of King Richard II (1377–1399). The heir to Lomen Clavell was the Beare family, lords of the nearby manor of Huntsham. There was however at some time a dispute over the inheritance between Thomas Beare and Sir Henry Perchey (alias Percehay). The hamlets of Lomen Clavell and Bukinton Clavell still retained the family's name in the 19th century. According to Pole the arms of "Clavill of Burlescombe" were: Or, three keys gules which are thus canting arms alluding to the Latin clavis, meaning a "key".

In Dorsetshire however the family continued longer than the Devonshire branch and according to Hutchins (d.1773) the Dorsetshire historian: "the family of Clavell could boast an antiquity not to be equalled in this county and very rarely in any other", and was carried on in the male line until the latter half of the 17th century.

== Landholdings in Devon ==
The manors or fees held by Walter I de Claville were recorded as 32 separate entries in the following order in the Domesday Book (with modern-day spellings):

Name of fee	Parish	Hundred	Book of Fees tenant-in-chief	Book of Fees mesne tenant
Bywood	Dunkeswell	Hemyock	Honour of Gloucester	John de Claville (whose tenant was Dunkeswell Abbey)
Brampford Speke	Brampford Speke	Wonford	Honour of Gloucester	Agnes de Esford (i.e. de Ayshford, see below)
Withycombe Raleigh	Withycombe Raleigh	East Budleigh	Honour of Gloucester	William de Claville
West Raddon	Shobrooke	West Budleigh	unrecorded TiC	unrecorded
Washford Pyne	Washford Pyne	Witheridge	unknown	Herbert de Pinu
Drayford	Witheridge	Witheridge	Honour of Gloucester	John le Despencer
Sydeham	Rackenford	Witheridge	unknown	Herbert de Pinu
Craze Lowman (Claville Lomene)	Tiverton	Tiverton	Honour of Gloucester	William de Claville
Kidwell	Uplowman	Halberton	Honour of Gloucester	William de Claville
Murley	Uplowman	Halberton	Honour of Gloucester	John Lancelevee
Coombe	Uplowman	Halberton	Honour of Gloucester	Robert Avenel
Boehill	Sampford Peverell	Halberton	Honour of Gloucester	William de Claville
Ayshford	Burlescombe	Halberton	Honour of Gloucester	Agnes de Esford
Appledore	Burlescombe	Halberton	Honour of Gloucester	William de Claville
Canonsleigh (Leige)	Burlescombe	Halberton	Unknown	(post 1170 Canonsleigh Priory)
Leonard	Halberton	Halberton	Honour of Gloucester	Dunkeswell Abbey
Bere (possibly Netherton)	possibly Farway	Colyton	unknown	unknown
Buckland-Tout-Saints(Woodmanstone in Bearscombe)	Buckland-Tout-Saints	Coleridge	Honour of Gloucester	Thomas de Wodemaneston
North Pool	South Pool	Coleridge	Honour of Gloucester	William de Bykelegh
Lupridge (Colemore)	North Huish (formerly in Ermington)	Stanborough	Honour of Gloucester	William de Bykelegh
Leigh (All Hallows Leigh/Leigh All Saints)	Churchstow	Stanborough	Honour of Gloucester	Geoffrey de Insula (de L'Isle)
One virgate in Iddesleigh	Iddesleigh	Shebbear	Honour of Gloucester	unknown
Dowland	Dowland	North Tawton	Honour of Gloucester	Henry de Nuny and wife Matilda
Loosedon (Lullardeston)	Winkleigh	North Tawton	Honour of Gloucester	Roger Cole
One virgate in Dowland	North Tawton	North Tawton	unknown	unknown
Instow (DB:Lohannestov (i.e.Johannes Stow, "John's Church")	Instow	Fremington	Honour of Gloucester	John de Sancto Johanne (de St John)
Chetelescote (possibly "Gillscott")	possibly Coldridge	possibly North Tawton	unknown	unknown
Nimet (Wolvys Nymet/Wolfin)	Down St Mary	North Tawton	Honour of Gloucester	Walter le Lou (le loup, "wolf")
Shobrooke	Morchard Bishop	Crediton	unknown	unknown
Burlescombe	Burlescombe	Bampton	unknown	given c.1170 to Canonsleigh Priory by Walter II Claville
Ciclet	unknown	possibly Bampton	unknown	unknown
Virworthy (held jointly with brother Gotshelm)	Pancrasweek	Black Torrington	unknown	unknown

== Landholdings in Dorset ==
In Dorset he held five manors including East Morden, since known as Morden-Maltravers. According to Hutchins four of the manors held by Walter de Claville in Domesday "seem to have passed at a very early period to a younger son—perhaps before the time of Henry II. Robert de Clavile held a fee in 'Porbica' in the time of Henry I., of which two hides were given to the Abbot of Tewkesbury, probably about 1106, soon after the Monastery of Cranborne became a priory dependent upon the former house. The gift was conferred by charter of King Henry I. In 12 Hen. II., (i.e. 1166 Cartae Baronum) Radulphus de Clavill held one fee in Dorset of Alured de Lincoln, of the "new feoffment", and Robert de Clavile held another of Gerbert de Perci, of the "old feoffment". Tewkesbury Abbey was founded by the Earl of Gloucester and thus is a link to the Honour of Gloucester to which Walter I's Devonshire holdings passed. The arms of the Clavell family of Dorset were: Argent, on a chevron sable three chapeaux or.

== Sources ==
- Thorn, Caroline & Frank, (eds.) Domesday Book, (Morris, John, gen. ed.) Vol. 9, Devon, Parts 1 & 2, Phillimore Press, Chichester, 1985, part 2 (notes), chapter 24
- Cleveland, Duchess of (Catherine Powlett), The Battle Abbey Roll with some Account of the Norman Lineages, 3 vols., London, 1889, Vol. III, "Clarvaile"
- Hutchins, John (d. 1773), History and Antiquities of the County of Dorset, 1774
