= Ralph de Pomeroy =

Norman in England

Ralph de Pomeroy (c. 1030 – before 1100) (alias de la Pomeroy, Pomeraie, Pomerei, etc.) was one of the 52 Devon Domesday Book tenants-in-chief of King William the Conqueror and was the first feudal baron of Berry Pomeroy in Devon. He held 58 landholdings in Devon.

== Origins ==
He was from La Pommeraye, Calvados in Normandy. His brother was William Cheever (fl. 1086), whose 46 Domesday Book holdings later formed the feudal barony of Bradninch, Devon. Many of the holdings of the two brothers had been split from single manors into two parts, one for each brother. His sister was Beatrix, who held from her other brother William Cheever the manor of Southleigh.

== Career ==
He participated in the Norman Conquest of England in 1066, for which services he was rewarded by the grant of 58 manors or other holdings in Devon and 2 manors in Somerset. He is said by historian John Lambrick Vivian (1895) to have been a benefactor to the Hospital of St John the Baptist at Falaise in Normandy, which was not, however, founded until 1127, therefore after his supposed date of death of 1100. He was one of the two commissioners appointed to carry to the royal treasury at Winchester the tax collected in Devon resulting from the assessment made upon the Domesday Book survey.

== Death and succession ==
He died before 1100, leaving several sons, of whom the eldest and his heir was William de la Pomeroy (died before 1114).

== Sources ==
- Sanders, I.J. English Baronies: A Study of their Origin and Descent 1086–1327, Oxford, 1960 (Pages 106–7, Barony of Berry Pomeroy)
- Thorn, Caroline & Frank, (eds.) Domesday Book, (Morris, John, gen.ed.) Vol. 9, Devon, Parts 1 & 2, Phillimore Press, Chichester, 1985. (Parts 1 & 2 chapter 34, holdings of Ralph of Pomeroy)
- Vivian, Lt.Col. J.L., (Ed.) The Visitations of the County of Devon: Comprising the Heralds' Visitations of 1531, 1564 & 1620, Exeter, 1895, pp. 605–9, pedigree of Pomeroy of Berry Pomeroy
