= Feudal baronies in Devonshire =

According to Sanders (1960) there were eight certain or probable English feudal baronies in Devonshire:

- Feudal barony of Bampton
- Feudal barony of Bradninch
- Feudal barony of Great Torrington
- Feudal barony of Okehampton
- Feudal barony of Totnes
- Feudal barony of Barnstaple
- Feudal barony of Berry Pomeroy
- Feudal barony of Plympton

Other sources, including William Pole writing in the early 17th century, have indicated there were an additional four feudal baronies. These baronies are: Dartington, Harberton, Bishop of Exeter, Abbot of Tavistock

== See also ==
- Feudal baronies in Cornwall

== Sources ==
- Sanders, I.J. English Baronies: A Study of their Origin and Descent 1086-1327, Oxford, 1960
- Pole, Sir William (d.1635), Collections Towards a Description of the County of Devon, Sir John-William de la Pole (ed.), London, 1791, Book I, pp.1-33
- Risdon, Tristram (d.1640), Survey of Devon, 1811 edition, London, 1811, with 1810 Additions, pp.361-4, The Baronies of this County and how many Knight's Fees were held of the Honours, with the Ensigns of their Ancient Owners
