= North Molton =

Village in Devon, England

Coordinates: 51°03′30″N 3°48′22″W

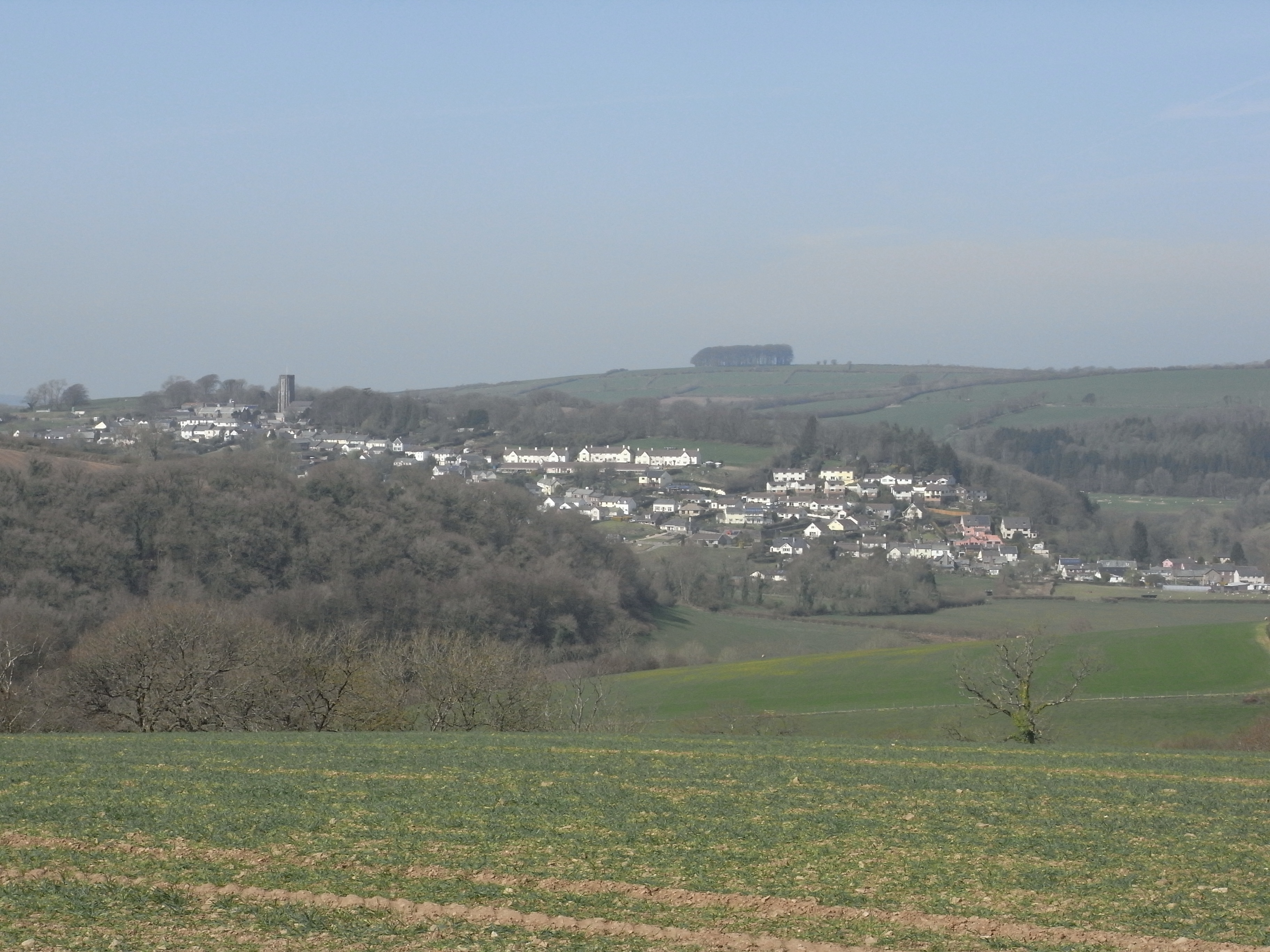
- North Molton, viewed from the south east. From the church at the top of the hill the village extends down a ridge to the River Mole. Bampfylde Clump is on the horizon
- Population: 721 (2011 Census)
- Civil parish: North Molton
- District: North Devon
- Shire county: Devon
- Region: South West
- Country: England
- Sovereign state: United Kingdom
- Post town: South Molton
- Postcode district: EX36
- Police: Devon and Cornwall
- Fire: Devon and Somerset
- Ambulance: South Western
- UK Parliament: North Devon

North Molton is a village, parish and former manor in North Devon, England. The population of the parish in 2001 was 1,047, decreasing to 721 in the 2011 census. An electoral ward with the same name also exists. The ward population at the census was 2,206. Bounded on the north east by the border with Somerset, it is the second largest parish in Devon, covering about 15,000 acres. Until the 18th century the village was an important centre of the woollen industry, and mining was also a significant employer in the parish until the 19th century.

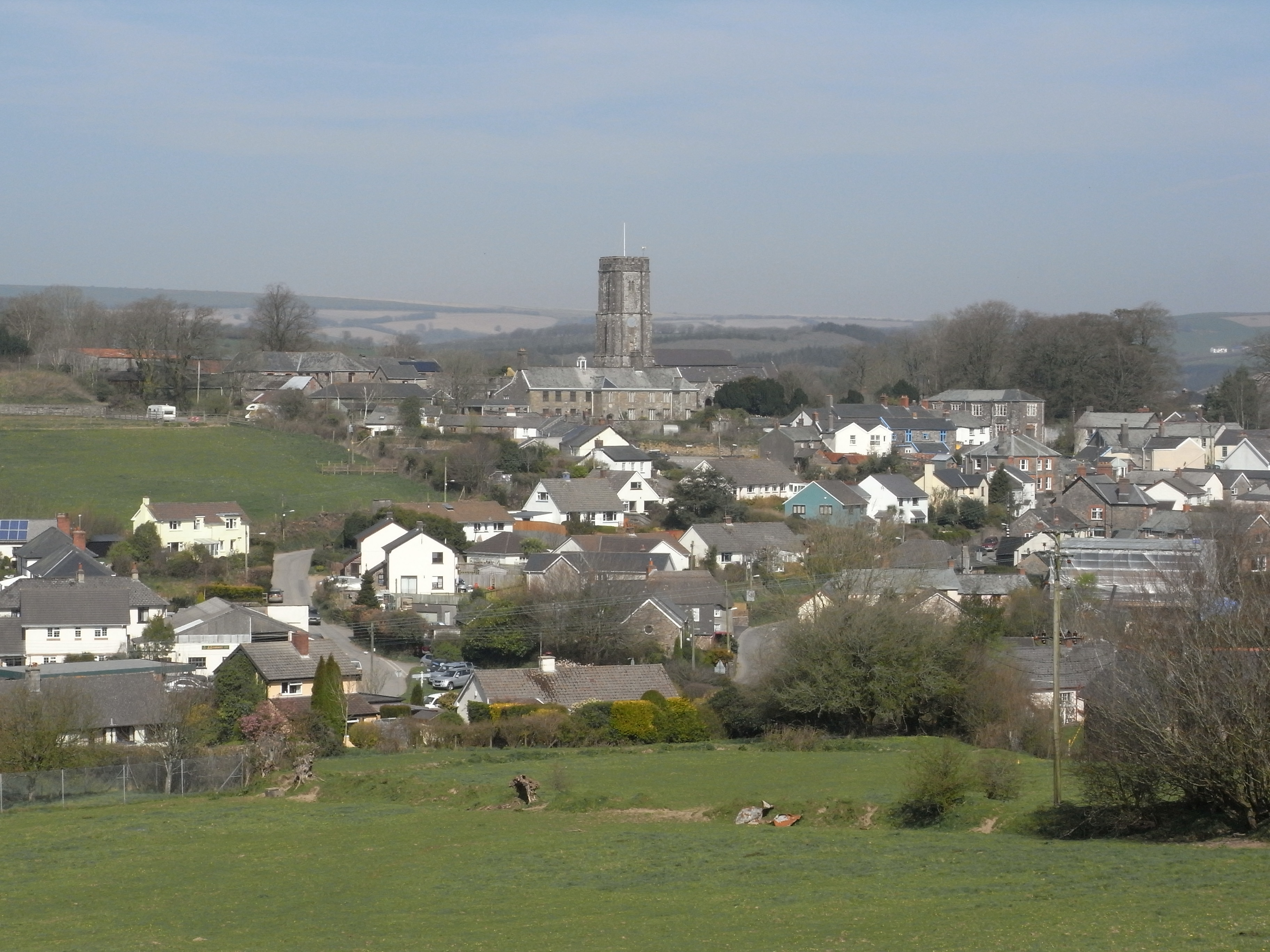
North Molton viewed from the southwest with Exmoor in the far distance

== History ==
North Molton was a manor within the royal demesne until it was granted to a member of the la Zouche family by King John. In 1270 Roger la Zouche was granted a licence to hold a weekly market in the manor and an annual fair on All Saints' Day. The manor then passed through the St Maur family to the Bampfylde family, in the 15th century. Amyas Bampfylde (died 1626) built Court Hall—now demolished—to the immediate east of the church.

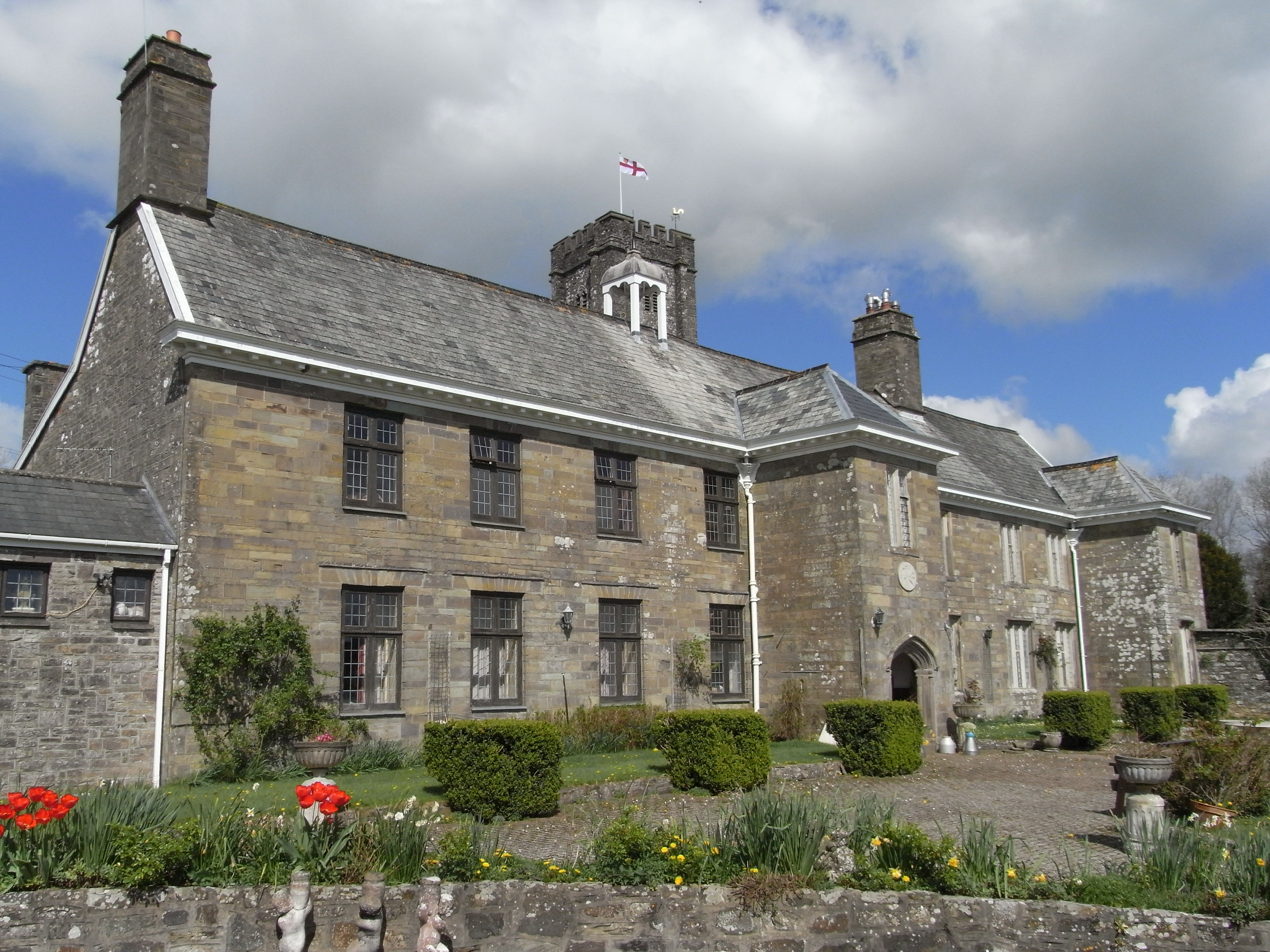
Court House viewed from the south west. The church tower is visible behind

The other significant family in the parish was the Parker family: in 1550 Edmund Parker was granted the office of bailiff of the manor and he built Court House, adjacent to the west of the church in 1553.

== All Saints' Church ==
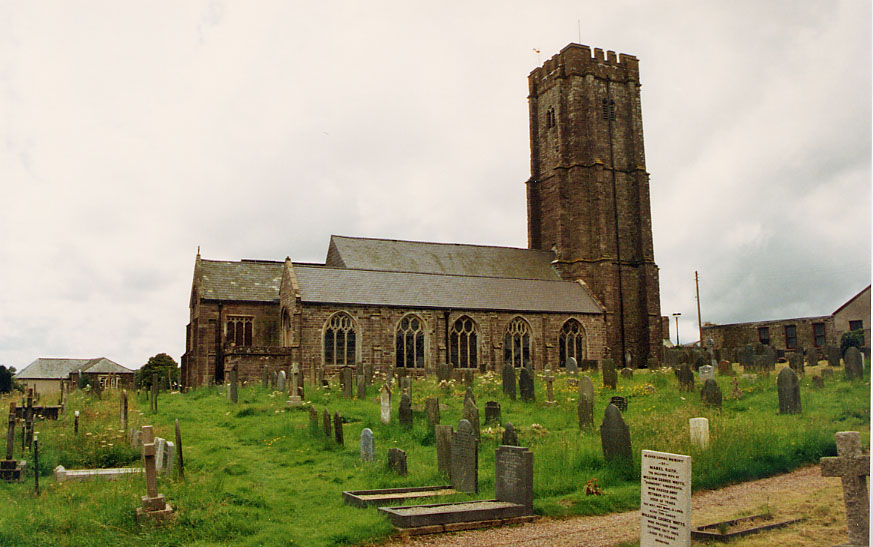
All Saints' Church, North Molton, viewed from north

At the higher side of the village square is the church of All Saints, with tall tower, nave and two aisles. The rood screen is Perpendicular Gothic in style and there are two parclose screens of different designs. The font is octagonal and also Perpendicular. There is a fine wall-monument with recumbent effigy of Sir Amyas Bampfylde (d.1626), who was ancestor to the Bampfylde Baronets and Barons Poltimore.

== Bampfylde Clump ==
Bampfylde Clump is a circular plantation of beech trees on the top of Bampfylde Hill, a short distance north west of the village, within the parish. It is a highly recognisable and distinctive landmark from many miles away from all points of the compass. It is situated on private land with public access by permissive footpath.

== Mining ==
In the 16th century there were mines in the region of Heasley Mill. Later workings were near North Radworthy, where in the early 19th century copper was worked and some gold was found, though not in sufficient quantities for commercial extraction. By the later 19th century, Bampfylde Mine on the River Mole was producing iron, copper and manganese before it closed in 1877; and Florence Mine, a mile to the east, was being worked for iron, copper and lead until 1885—from 1874 this mine had a tramway running the four miles to South Molton railway station.

== Historic estates ==
- North Radworthy
- South Radworthy
