= Aiulf =

Aiulf is a given name. Notable people with the name include:

- Aiulf I of Benevento (died 642), Duke of Benevento
- Aiulf II of Benevento (fl. 884–891), Prince of Benevento
- Aiulf the Chamberlain (fl. 1080s), English landowner and High Sheriff of Dorset

== See also ==
- Aioulf
