= Feudal barony of Berry Pomeroy =

11th-century baron's seat in Devonshire, England

The feudal barony of Berry Pomeroy was one of eight feudal baronies in Devonshire, England, which existed during the mediaeval era. It had its caput at the manor of Berry Pomeroy, 20 miles south of the City of Exeter and 2 miles east of the town of Totnes, where was situated Totnes Castle, the caput of the feudal barony of Totnes. The exact location of the 11th-century baron's residence is unclear; perhaps it was next to the parish church on the site of the former rectory known as Berry House, as it is now believed that the nearby ruined Berry Pomeroy Castle was not built until the 15th century.

The manor and barony was owned by the Pomeroy family from before 1086 until 1547, when it was purchased by Edward Seymour, 1st Duke of Somerset, in whose family it has since remained. Today the manor and much of the former estate belongs to his descendant the Duke of Somerset, seated at Maiden Bradley House in Wiltshire.

== Descent ==
=== Pomeroy ===
Ralph de la Pomeroy (died before 1100) (alias Pomeraie, Pomerei, etc.)
1st feudal baron of Berry, one of the Devon Domesday Book tenants-in-chief in 1086. He was lord of the manor of La Pommeraye, Calvados in Normandy. He was one of the two commissioners appointed to carry to the royal treasury at Winchester the tax collected in Devon resulting from the assessment made based upon the Domesday Book survey.

William de la Pomeroy (died before 1114)
Eldest son and heir, who in 1102 donated the manor of Berry (Pomeroy) to Gloucester Abbey, which during the abbacy of Serlo (died 1104) was redeemed by his brother Joscelin in exchange for Seldene (alias "Seldenam", in Devon). He donated 1/4 of a knight's fee in St Omer in Normandy to the "Abbey of Val in St Omer". He died without children at some time before 1114.

Joscelin (alias Gozeline) de la Pomeroy (died after 1123) (younger brother)
He refounded the "Abbey of Val in St Omer" in the diocese of Bayeux, Normandy, to which in 1125 he gave the churches of Berry (Pomeroy), "Braordin" and "Clisson" in Devon with others elsewhere, and also a small estate and tithe of a mill in La Pommeraye. He married a certain Emma, who consented to her husband's grants of 1125.

Henry de la Pomeroy (fl. 1156, died before 1165), Constable of Normandy. (son)
A household knight of King Henry (1100–1135) and named as one of the king's household constables in the Constitutio Domus Regis. He was a leader of the king's household troops on several occasions, notably in 1124 at the Battle of Bourgtheroulde, about ten miles southwest of Rouen. He married Rohese de Dunstanville.

Arms of Pomeroy Or, a lion rampant guardant gules armed and langued azure a bordure engrailed sable

The descent of the barony in the de la Pomeroy family is as follows:

Henry de la Pomeroy (died 1201/7) (eldest son)
He married Rohesia Bardolf, sister of Doun Bardolf (1177–1205) Rohesia survived her husband, and as the widow of a tenant-in-chief, Rohesia's second marriage became the property of the crown to dispose of, and in 1201/2 Sir John Russell (died c. 1224) of Kingston Russell in Dorset agreed to pay 50 marks to the royal treasury for the hand of his bride. After Russell's death in 1224 his widow Rohesia obtained royal licence of the king, at the suit of Ralph de Blundeville, Earl of Chester and Lincoln (1172–1232), to marry whomsoever she pleased, so long as he should be a faithful subject of the crown. This was perhaps merely a formality to give her freedom from "troublesome solicitations of the king's courtiers" and no records survive of any subsequent marriage having occurred. Following the death Henry de la Pomeroy his estates were assigned by the King into the custody of William Brewer until 1210 when his heir raised 600 marks for his feudal relief.

Henry de la Pomeroy (died 1222) (son)
He married Joan de Vautort (alias Valletort), a daughter and in her issue co-heir of Roger de Vautort (died 1207), feudal baron of Totnes from 1206.

Henry de la Pomeroy (1211–1237)

Henry de la Pomeroy (born after 1216; died 1281)
He was a minor under the age of 21 at his father's death in 1237. He confirmed his ancestor's grants to Ford Abbey. He married a certain Isolde, a widow, who survived him and in 1293 is recorded as holding as her dower one third (a widow's usual entitlement) of her late husband's manors of Berry and Stockleigh Pomeroy

Sir Henry de la Pomeroy (1266–1305) (son)
He was born at Tregony, in Cornwall. In 1281 he married Amice de Camville, daughter of Sir Geoffrey de Camville (died 1308). Amice survived her husband.

Sir Henry de la Pomeroy (1291–1327) (son)
He married Joan de Moels, daughter of John de Moels, 1st Baron Moels (died 1310), of North Cadbury.

Sir Henry de la Pomeroy (died 1373) (son)

Sir John de la Pomeroy (1347–1416)
Married Joan de Merton, daughter and co-heir of Richard de Merton and widow of John Bampfield of Poltimore, The marriage was without children. His heirs were his nephew John Cole, son of his sister Margaret, and his niece Joan Chudleigh (1376–1423), daughter of his sister Joan.

Sir Thomas Pomeroy (died 1426)
Though Sir John named as heir to the Pomeroy barony his distant cousin, Edward de Pomeroy, great-grandson of Sir Henry and Joan Moels, the king was persuaded to set aside his chosen successor and instead award the inheritance to a cadet, Sir Thomas Pomeroy, son of Robert of Upottery & Bockerell, whose claim came not from his Pomeroy descent but due to his unlicensed marriage in 1388 to Joan Chudleigh, the twice widowed niece and coheir of Sir John. Thomas and Joan had one daughter Isabel who died after her mother's 1423 death, and before that of her father, who had remarried to Joan Raleigh widow of Whalesborough, in 1426. On Thomas' death, the lands reverted to Sir John's preferred heir, Edward.

Edward de Pomeroy (died 1446)
Son of William and grandson Thomas, the 5th son of Sir Henry and Joan Moels, he inherited the barony after the death of Sir Thomas. In about 1404 he had married Margaret Beville (died 1461), daughter of John Beville of Woolston in Poundstock, Cornw. Edward died in 1446 Margaret in 1461.

Henry de Pomeroy (1416–1481) (son)
He married Alice Raleigh, daughter of John Raleigh of Fardell, Devon. His eldest son Sir Seintclere de Pomeroy (died 1471) predeceased his father childless.

Sir Richard de Pomeroy (1442–1496)
Sheriff of Devon in 1473, a Knight of the Bath, knighted by King Henry VII. He married Elizabeth Densell (died 1508), daughter and co-heiress of Richard Densell of Weare Giffard and Filleigh in Devon, and widow of Martin Fortescue (died 1472), of Wimpstone in the parish of Modbury in Devon. The monument to himself and his wife survives in Berry Pomeroy Church, but is missing all its original monumental brasses.

Sir Edward de Pomeroy (1478–1538)
He married Johanna Sapcot, daughter of Sir John Sapcote.

Sir Thomas Pomeroy (1503–1566) (son)
Married Jone Edgcumbe, daughter of Sir Piers Edgcumbe of Cotohele (Mount Edgcumbe was not built till 1547–1553, by Sir Piers son Richard). On 1 December 1547 he sold the castle, park and manor of Berry Pomeroy to Edward Seymour, 1st Duke of Somerset, who gave it to his eldest son from his first marriage, Lord Edward Seymour (1529–1593).

=== Seymour ===
Arms of Seymour of Berry Pomeroy: Gules, two wings conjoined in lure or.

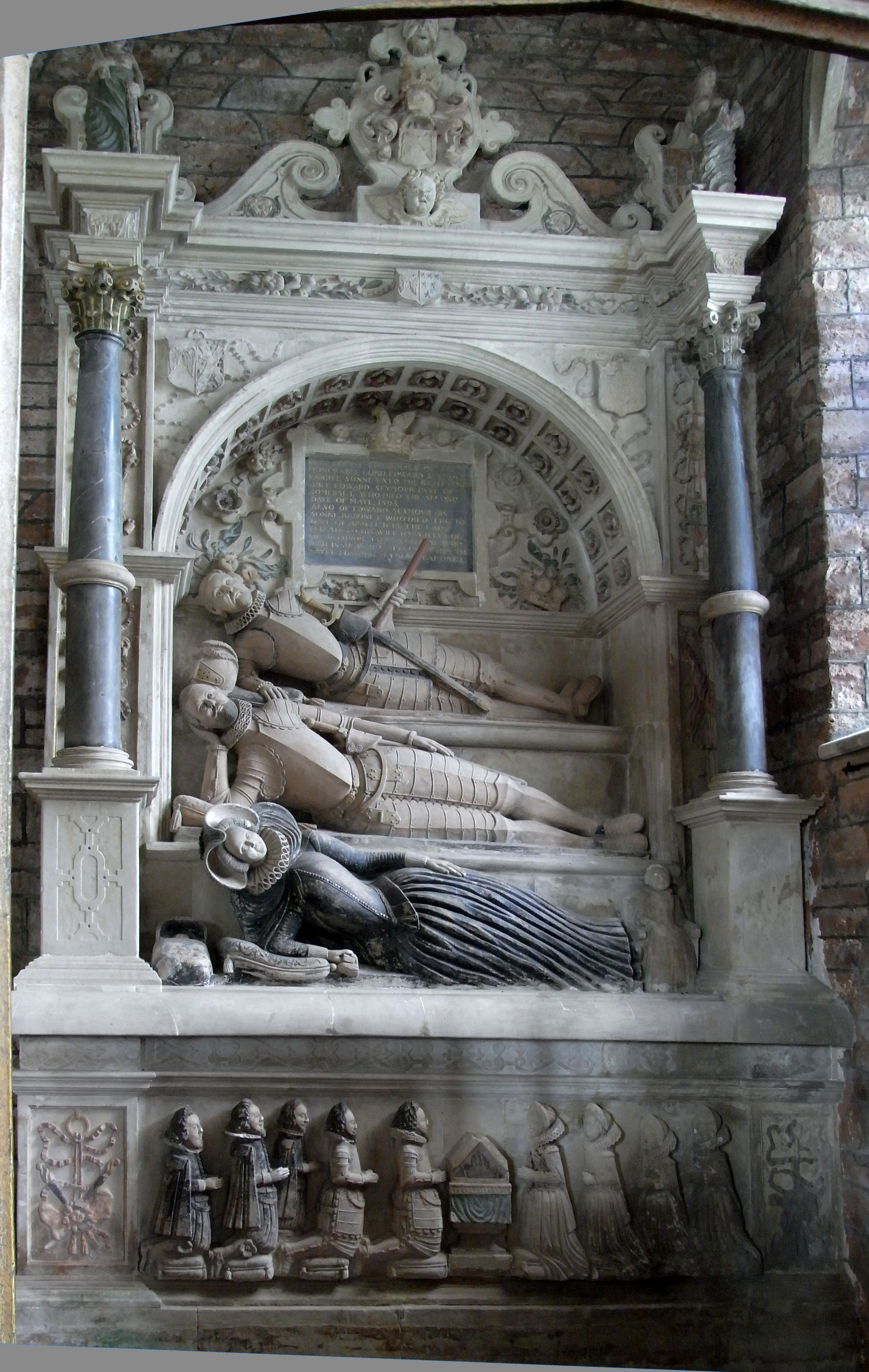
Monument to Lord Edward Seymour (d. 1593), and to his son and daughter-in-law, Berry Pomeroy Church

The descent of Berry Pomeroy in the Seymour family is as follows:

Edward Seymour, 1st Duke of Somerset (c. 1500–1552)
On 1 December 1547 he purchased the castle, park and manor of Berry Pomeroy from Sir Thomas Pomeroy (1503–1566).

Lord Edward Seymour (1529–1593) (son by first marriage)
He was a Sheriff of Devon. Married Margaret Walsh, a daughter and co-heir of John Welsh of Cathanger, Fivehead, Somerset, Justice of the Common Pleas in 1563.

Sir Edward Seymour, 1st Baronet (c. 1563–1613) (son)
Member of Parliament for Devon and twice Sheriff of Devon. He married Elizabeth Champernowne, daughter of Sir Arthur Champernowne, of nearby Dartington, Devon. He spent a large amount of money extending Berry Pomeroy Castle, particularly with the addition of the north range in about 1600. His monument erected after 1613 exists in Berry Pomeroy Church, which shows three tiers of effigies representing his father, himself and his wife and children.

Sir Edward Seymour, 2nd Baronet (c. 1580–1659) (son)
MP for Penryn and Newport and other seats. He married Dorothy Killegrew daughter of Sir Henry Killigrew, of Laroch. He was a Royalist in the Civil War during which he and his son were captured at Plymouth.

Sir Edward Seymour, 3rd Baronet (1610–1688) (son)
MP for Devon and Totnes. Deputy Lieutenant and Vice-Admiral of Devon. In 1688 following the Glorious Revolution he entertained William of Orange at Berry Pomeroy, shortly after he had landed at Torbay. After his death an inventory of Berry Pomeroy Castle was drawn up. He married Anne Portman (died 1695), daughter of Sir John Portman, 1st Baronet, of Orchard Portman, Somerset.

Sir Edward Seymour, 4th Baronet (1633–1708) (son)
He was Speaker of the House of Commons. He married Margaret Wale (who died before 1674), the daughter of Sir William Wale, of North Lappenham, Rutland, an Alderman of London. He moved his principal residence to Bradley House, Maiden Bradley in Wiltshire, and Berry Pomeroy was abandoned.

Sir Edward Seymour, 5th Baronet (1663–1741), MP (son)
He married Laetitia Popham (died 1738), daughter of Sir Francis Popham, of Littlecote, Wiltshire.

Edward Seymour, 8th Duke of Somerset (1694–1757) (son)
He inherited the dukedom from his distant Seymour cousin. After him the descent of Berry Pomeroy follows the descent of the Dukes of Somerset.

== Sources ==
- Pomeroy, Albert A., History and Genealogy of the Pomeroy Family, 3 parts, Detroit, USA, 1922, part 3
- Powley, E. B. The House of De La Pomerai, Liverpool, 1944
- Prince, Rev. John, Worthies of Devon (1701), 1810 edition, pp. 645–9, Pomerai, Sir Henry, Lord of Biry
- Sanders, I. J. English Baronies, Oxford, 1960, pp. 106–7, Berry Pomeroy
- Vivian, Lt.Col. J. L., (ed.) The Visitations of the County of Devon: Comprising the Heralds' Visitations of 1531, 1564 & 1620, Exeter, 1895, pp. 605–9, Pomeroy
