= Canonsleigh =

Rural hamlet in Devon, England

- OS grid reference: ST060150
- Civil parish: Burlescombe
- District: Mid Devon
- Shire county: Devon
- Country: England
- Sovereign state: United Kingdom
- UK Parliament: Tiverton and Honiton

Canonsleigh is a small rural hamlet in the civil parish of Burlescombe, within the district of Mid Devon in the county of Devon, England. It lies close to the site of the former Canonsleigh Abbey, near the Devon–Somerset border.

== Geography ==
Canonsleigh lies in the valley of the River Culm, approximately 3 miles (5 km) north-east of Uffculme and about 7 miles (11 km) east of Tiverton. The hamlet is surrounded by agricultural land and scattered farmsteads typical of this part of South West England.

== History ==
The name of the hamlet derives from the medieval religious foundation of Canonsleigh Abbey. Around 1170 Walter de Claville established a house of Augustinian canons at Leigh (later known as "Leigh Canonicorum" or "Canons’ Leigh"). In 1285 the abbey was refounded as a nunnery by Maud de Lacy, Countess of Gloucester. It was suppressed in 1539 during the Dissolution of the Monasteries. Following dissolution, the monastic lands were granted to secular owners, and the settlement that developed around the former abbey site became known as Canonsleigh.

== Governance ==
The hamlet forms part of the civil parish of Burlescombe and comes under Mid Devon District Council. In parliamentary terms it lies within the Tiverton and Honiton constituency.

== Listed Buildings and Heritage Assets ==
Several buildings in Canonsleigh and its environs are recognised by Historic England as being of special architectural or historic interest:

- Canonsleigh Abbey – The site of the former abbey, designated as a scheduled monument.
- Canonsleigh Barton Farmhouse - Grade II listed early 17th-century farmhouse.
- Canonsleigh Priory Gatehouse – surviving medieval gatehouse of the abbey, Grade II listed.
- Canonsleigh Priory Mill – mill building associated with the abbey estate, Grade II listed.
- Limekilns at ST 066 174 – 19th-century lime-kilns on the hillside near Westleigh Quarry, Grade II listed.

== Digital Media ==
A collection of 360° digital views of Canonsleigh are available online, showing the surviving structures and surrounding landscape. The resource provides panoramic images of sites in their present state and illustrates their layouts within the surrounding countryside.
