= South Molton Hundred =

Ancient administrative unit of Devon, England

South Molton Hundred was the name of one of thirty two ancient administrative units of Devon, England.

The parishes in the hundred were: East Anstey, Bishop's Tawton, Chittlehampton, George Nympton, Knowstone, Landkey, Molland, North Molton, Satterleigh, South Molton, Swimbridge, Twitchen, Warkleigh and West Anstey.

== See also ==
- List of hundreds of England and Wales - Devon
