= Alfred of Spain =

Norman lord recorded in the Domesday Book

Alfred of Spain was a Norman lord recorded in the Domesday Book of 1086. He held land mainly in Somerset but also in Devon, Dorset, Wiltshire, Gloucestershire and Herefordshire. He was not from Spain but from Épaignes in Normandy. The Domesday scribes rendered his name into Latin as Alvredi De Ispania as a kind of word play, and in English his name is written variously Alfred or Alvred of or de Spain, Hispania or Ispania. It has been suggested that he may have built the castle at Nether Stowey or possibly an earlier one which has since disappeared at Over Stowey. Much of his land was the pre-Conquest estate of a Saxon lord named Alfwy, although the important manor of Stowey had been held by King Harold.
