= William Cheever =

11th-century tenant-in-chief in England

William Cheever (fl. 1086) (alias Chievre) (Latinised to Capra, "she-goat", from French chèvre) was one of the 52 Devon Domesday Book tenants-in-chief of King William the Conqueror. He held 46 landholdings in Devon. His lands later formed (together with three of the four Devonshire estates of Ralph de Limesy), the feudal barony of Bradninch, Devon. His brother was Ralph de Pomeroy, feudal baron of Berry Pomeroy, Devon, with whom several of his holdings had been divided into two parts, one for each brother. His sister was Beatrix, who held from him the manor of Southleigh.

== Succession ==
It is not known whether Cheever married and left progeny; however, his estates escheated to the crown during the reign of King Henry I (1100–1135), who granted them to his own illegitimate son William I de Tracy (died c. 1136).

== Sources ==
- Sanders, I. J. English Baronies: A Study of their Origin and Descent 1086–1327, Oxford, 1960 (Pages 20–1, Barony of Bradninch)
- Thorn, Caroline & Frank, (eds.) Domesday Book, Vol. 9, Devon, Parts 1 & 2, Phillimore Press, Chichester, 1985. (Parts 1 & 2 chapter 19, holdings of William Cheever)
