= Feudal barony of Launceston =

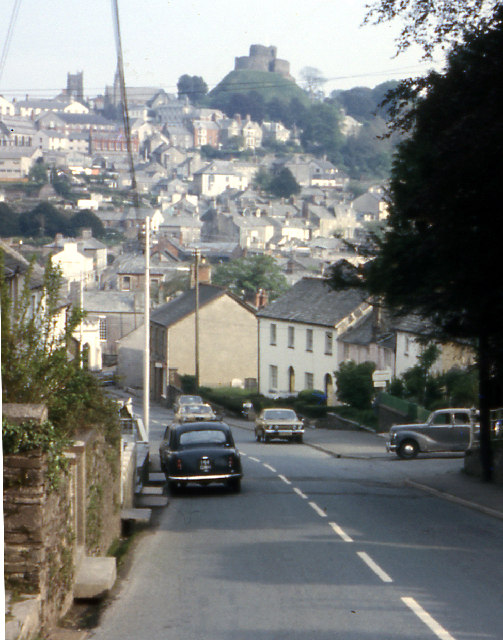
Launceston Castle, caput of the feudal barony, which still dominates the town of Launceston in modern times

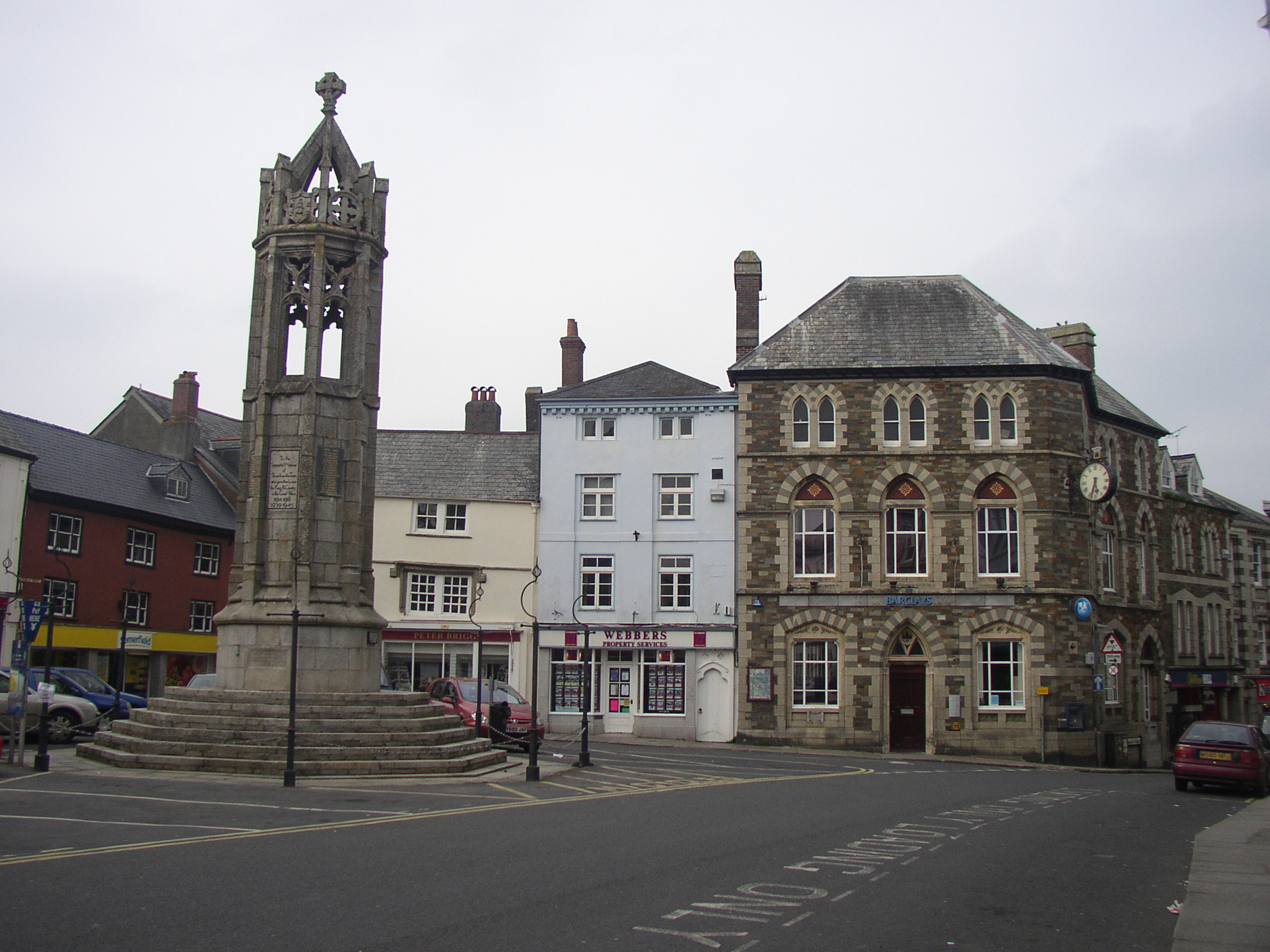
Town Square, in the centre of Launceston

Launceston was one of three Feudal baronies in Cornwall which existed in the mediaeval era. Its caput was at Launceston Castle.

== Descent ==
- Robert, Count of Mortain (d.1090). The barony was granted by William the Conqueror to his half-brother Robert, Count of Mortain (d.1090).
- William, Count of Mortain (son), who sided with Robert Curthose, Duke of Normandy against the latter's younger brother King Henry I of England, and was defeated at the Battle of Tinchebray in 1106 when his honours were forfeited to the crown.
- Alan, 1st Earl of Richmond (d.1146), 4th feudal baron of Richmond, Yorkshire, to whom the barony was next granted in 1140 by King Stephen. He lost the barony in 1141 during the war between Stephen and the Empress Matilda.
- Reginald de Dunstanville (d.1175), to whom the barony was granted in 1141 by the Empress Matilda. She also created him Earl of Cornwall. He died in 1175 without legitimate issue when the barony escheated to the crown.

== Earls of Cornwall ==
Following the death of Reginald de Dunstanville the feudal barony of Launceston effectively became merged with the lands of the Earldom of Cornwall, which was granted in 1189 by King Richard I (1189–1199) to his younger brother Prince John, later King John (1199–1216).

== Sources ==
- Sanders, I.J., English Baronies, A Study of their Origin and Descent 1086-1327, Oxford, 1960, p. 60, Barony of Launceston
