= Feudal barony of Totnes =

The feudal barony of Totnes was a large feudal barony with its caput at Totnes Castle in Devon, England. It was one of eight feudal baronies in Devonshire which existed in the mediaeval era. The first feudal baron was Juhel de Totnes (died 1123/30), who is listed in the Domesday Book of 1086 as possessing 107 manors or other landholdings in Devon.
