= Feudal barony of Great Torrington =

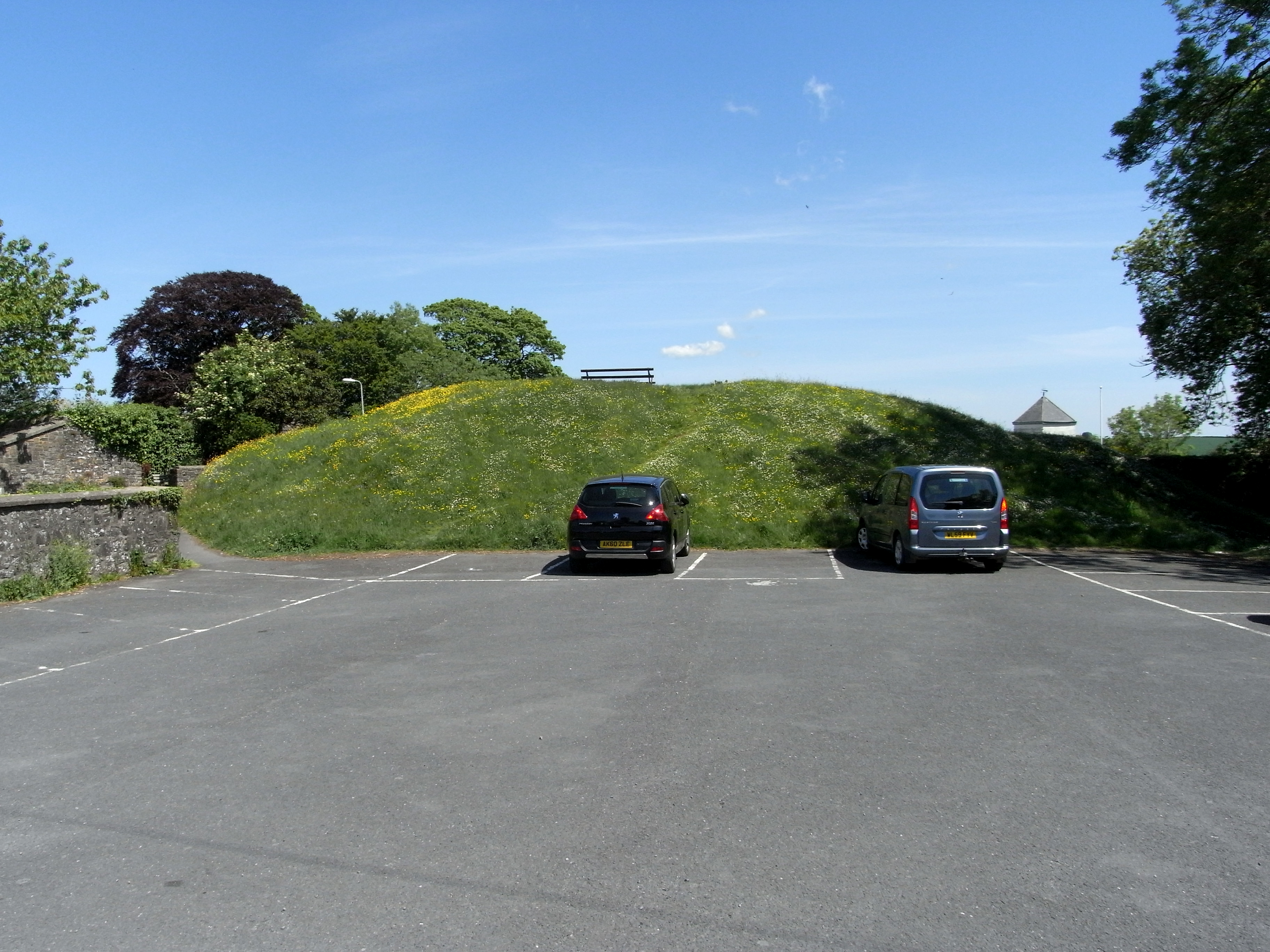
Remnant of motte of Great Torrington Castle. The bowling green beyond occupies the site of the former bailey

The feudal barony of Great Torrington whose caput was Great Torrington Castle in Devonshire, was one of eight feudal baronies in Devonshire which existed during the mediaeval era.

== Sources ==
- Sanders, I.J. English Baronies: A Study of their Origin and Descent 1086–1327, Oxford, 1960, pp. 48–9, Great Torrington
- Pole, Sir William (d.1635), Collections Towards a Description of the County of Devon, Sir John-William de la Pole (ed.), London, 1791, pp. 20–1, Torinton
- Risdon, Tristram (d.1640), Survey of Devon, 1811 edition, London, 1811, with 1810 Additions, p. 362, The Baronies of this County, etc.,
