= Feudal barony of Bradninch =

The feudal barony of Bradninch was one of eight feudal baronies in Devonshire which existed during the mediaeval era, and had its caput at the manor of Bradninch. One of the notorious barons was William de Tracy (died c.1189), who was one of the four knights who assassinated Thomas Becket, Archbishop of Canterbury, in Canterbury Cathedral in December 1170.

== Sources ==
- Sanders, I.J. English Baronies: A Study of their Origin and Descent 1086–1327, Oxford, 1960, pp. 20–21
- Pole, Sir William (d.1635), Collections Towards a Description of the County of Devon, Sir John-William de la Pole (ed.), London, 1791, p. 24, Braneis
