= Culmstock Halt railway station =

Disused railway station in Culmstock, Mid Devon

Culmstock Halt

General information
- Location: Culmstock, Devon; England
- Coordinates: 50.9167°N 3.2788°W
- Grid reference: ST102138
- Platforms: 1

Other information
- Status: Disused

History
- Original company: Culm Valley Light Railway
- Pre-grouping: Great Western Railway
- Post-grouping: Great Western Railway; British Railways (Western Region)

Key dates
- 29 May 1876: Opened
- 9 September 1963: Closed
Location

Culmstock Halt railway station served the village of Culmstock, Devon, England, from 1876 to 1963 on the Culm Valley Light Railway.

== History ==
The station was opened on 29 May 1876 by the Culm Valley Light Railway. It was situated on the east side of the B3391. Opposite the platform was the goods yard which had two sidings; one serving a loading dock and the other serving a goods shed. 'Halt' was added to the station's name on 2 May 1960 as it became an unstaffed halt. It closed on 9 September 1963. The sidings were lifted in 1965.

Preceding station	Disused railways	Following station
Whitehall Halt; Line and station closed	Culm Valley Light Railway	Uffculme; Line and station closed
