= Hemyock railway station =

Disused railway station in Hemyock, Devon

Hemyock
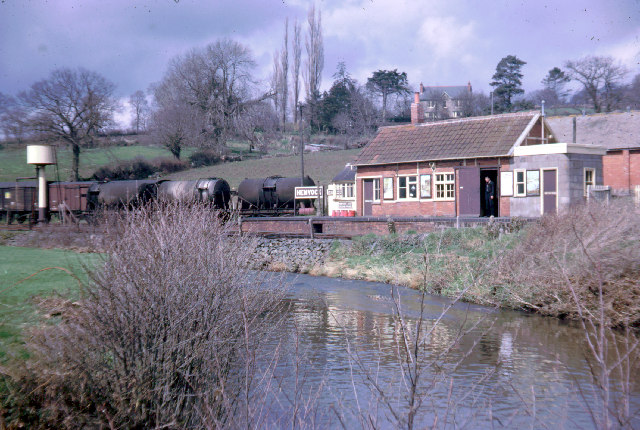
- The station in 1963

General information
- Location: Hemyock, Devon; England
- Coordinates: 50.919°N 3.2263°W
- Grid reference: ST139140
- Platforms: 1

Other information
- Status: Disused

History
- Original company: Culm Valley Light Railway
- Pre-grouping: Great Western Railway
- Post-grouping: Great Western Railway; British Railways (Western Region)

Key dates
- 29 May 1876: Opened
- 9 September 1963: Closed to passengers
- 6 September 1965: Closed to goods
Location

Hemyock railway station served the village of Hemyock, Devon, England, from 1876 to 1963 on the Culm Valley Light Railway.

== History ==
The station was opened on 29 May 1876 by the Culm Valley Light Railway. It was situated on the east side of B3391. A refreshment room opened in 1878 in an attempt to attract more passengers. This didn't work, however, and the refreshment room became a carriage shed and ended up as a poultry store. The station had two sidings, one serving a cattle dock to the south and the other running behind the station. Two further sidings served a goods shed and an engine shed. A ground frame controlled access to these. The station was refurbished in 1932; the goods shed and engine shed were removed and the cattle dock siding was extended into the dairy siding to the north. The station closed to passengers on 9 September 1963 and closed to goods traffic on 6 September 1965. One of the sidings that served the dairy remained open until 1 November 1975.

Preceding station	Disused railways	Following station
Terminus	Culm Valley Light Railway	Whitehall Halt; Line and station closed
