= Uffculme School =

Location
- Chapel Hill; Uffculme, Devon, EX15 3AG; England
- Coordinates: 50.90774°N 3.33265°W

Information
- Type: Academy
- Specialists: Maths, computing and applied learning
- Department for Education URN: 136287 Tables
- Ofsted: Reports
- Headteacher: Laura Jenkins
- Gender: Mixed
- Age: 11 to 16
- Enrolment: 1069
- Houses: Bridwell, Craddock, Gaddon, Yondercott
- Website: Official website

Uffculme School is a mixed secondary school located in Uffculme in the English county of Devon. It is part of the Blackdown Education Partnership Trust, a multi-academy trust.

Previously a community school administered by Devon County Council, Uffculme School was converted to academy status on 1 September 2010. However the school continues to co-ordinate admissions with Devon County Council. As of 2014, pupils were normally admitted from Burlescombe CE Primary School, Culmstock Primary School, Hemyock Primary School, Kentisbeare CE Primary School, Sampford Peverell CE Primary School, Uffculme Primary School, Uplowman CE Primary School and Webber's CE Primary School.

Uffculme School offers GCSE, BTEC and Cambridge Nationals courses as programmes of study for pupils. In addition, the school offers a range of vocational courses in conjunction with Petroc College and Bicton College. It is a specialist maths, computing and applied learning college.

== Notable former pupils ==
- Joss Stone, singer
- Ben Moon, English Rugby Union player
