= Whitehall Halt railway station =

Disused railway station in Honiton, Mid Devon

Whitehall Halt

General information
- Location: Hemyock, Devon; England
- Coordinates: 50.919°N 3.2475°W
- Grid reference: ST139140
- Platforms: 1

Other information
- Status: Disused

History
- Original company: Great Western Railway
- Post-grouping: Great Western Railway; British Railways (Western Region)

Key dates
- 27 February 1933: Opened
- 9 September 1963: Closed
Location

Whitehall Halt railway station existed on the Culm Valley Light Railway in Devon, England, from 1933 to 1963.

== History ==
The station was opened on 27 February 1933 by the Great Western Railway. It was situated on the west side of Station Road. It had a siding, although there were no freight facilities. Great Western Railway tickets showed it as Whitehall Crossing Halt. The station closed on 9 September 1963. Some of the platform still survives.

Preceding station	Disused railways	Following station
Hemyock; Line and station closed	Great Western Railway; Culm Valley Light Railway	Culmstock Halt; Line and station closed
