= Hemyock Hundred =

Ancient administrative unit of Devon, England

Hemyock Hundred was the name of one of thirty two ancient administrative units of Devon, England.

The parishes in the hundred were: Awliscombe, Buckerell, Churchstanton, Clayhidon, Culmstock, Dunkeswell and Hemyock

== See also ==
- List of hundreds of England and Wales - Devon
