= Sumption =

Sumption may refer to:

- Anthony Sumption (1919–2008), British submarine commander and tax lawyer
- Charles Sumption (1910–1988), Indian cricketer
- Harold Sumption (1916–1998), English advertising executive and fundraiser
- Jonathan Sumption, Lord Sumption (born 1948), British historian and judge
- Madeleine Sumption, director of the Migration Observatory at the University of Oxford
