= Clayhidon =

Village in Mid Devon, England

Coordinates: 50.934°N 3.195°W

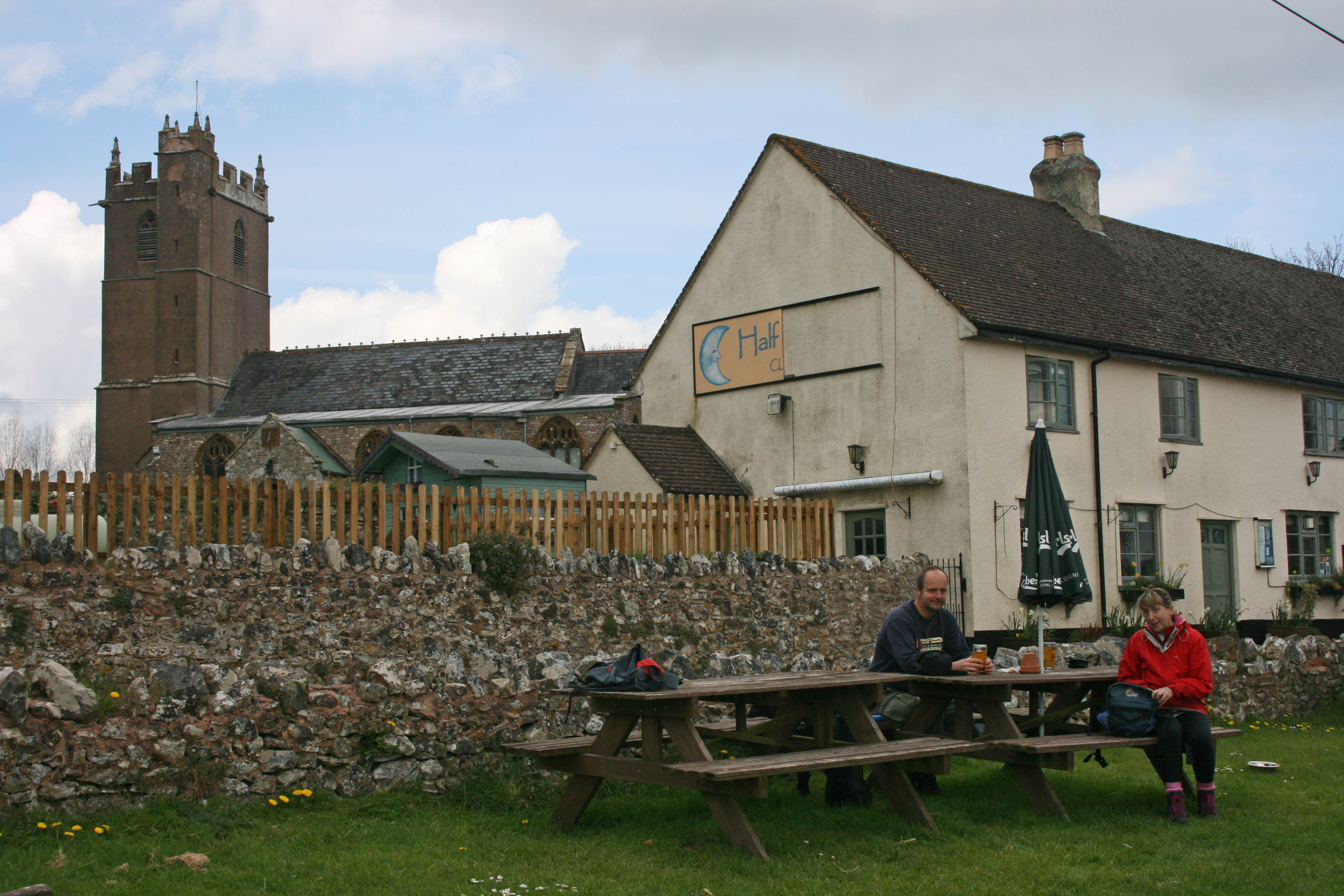
The village pub and church

Location of Clayhidon in Devon

Clayhidon (/kleɪˈhaɪdən/) is a village and civil parish in Mid Devon, England. The parish church is St. Andrews. The parish is in the Blackdown Hills and its northern and eastern boundaries form part of the Devon – Somerset border. From the south-east it has boundaries with the Devon parishes of Upottery, Luppitt and Hemyock.

Current information about life in the parish, including detailed proceedings of Clayhidon Parish Council since November 2002, can be found on a community website, launched in March 2011. A parish history is found in the Uffculme library and an old map can be found on the Devon Libraries Local Studies website.
