= Church of St Mary the Virgin, Uffculme =

Coordinates: 50.90632°N 3.32619°W

Church of St Mary the Virgin
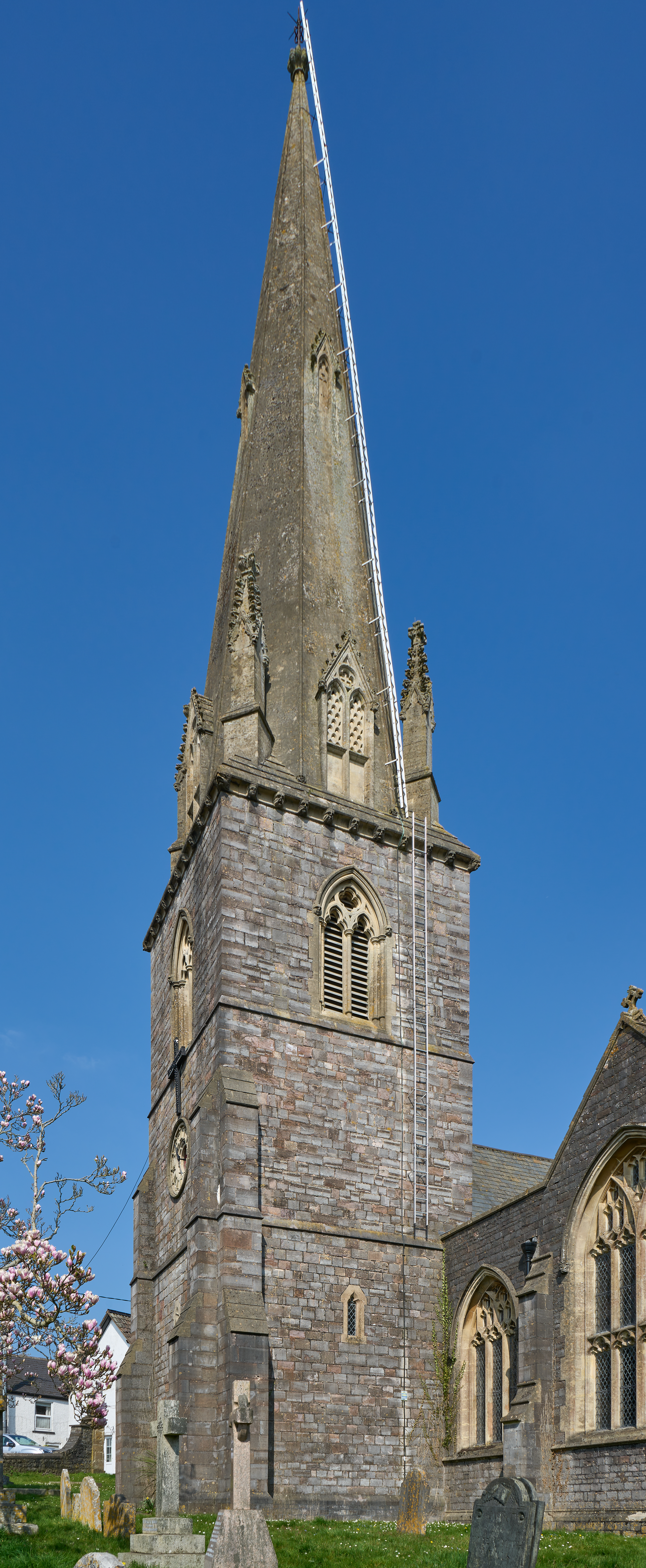
- St Mary the Virgin from the south-west

- Location in Devon
- Location: Uffculme, Devon, England
- Denomination: Church of England

History
- Founded: c. 1136
- Dedication: Virgin Mary

Architecture
- Heritage designation: Grade II*
- Designated: 5 April 1966
- Years built: c. 1300 - 1849

Administration
- Province: Canterbury
- Diocese: Exeter
- Archdeaconry: Exeter
- Deanery: Tiverton and Cullompton
- Parish: Uffculme

The Church of St Mary the Virgin is the main Church of England parish church for the village of Uffculme, Devon, England. First mentioned in a charter dating back to 1136, the present church has a mixture of medieval and Victorian architecture and is a Grade II* listed building. The church building is notable for its rood screen, the longest and oldest in the county, as well as its tall broach spire, a rare feature on churches in Devon.

== History ==
=== Medieval era ===
Though the first mention of a church on the site is in a charter of 1136, it is believed there has been a church on the site since Saxon times, possibly founded by the monks of Glastonbury Abbey. No traces of this early building survive, as the church was slowly rebuilt from the early 14th century into the Gothic style.

From the early 14th century, the building was progressively rebuilt, beginning with the north nave aisle, chancel and tower. In the early 15th century, rebuilding continued, with an eastern extension on the north nave aisle, the south nave aisle and the rood screen. Further construction in the ensuing centuries was more interior focused, with the altar and reredos carvings dating to the 16th century.

=== 18th and 19th centuries ===
Initially, the 18th century saw little changes. In 1715, the pulpit was created, and this is still used today. The nave and aisle roofs were also renewed in the 18th century. However, the first 50 years of the 19th century saw major rebuilding and expansion not seen since the 14th and 15th centuries at Uffculme. In 1828, the medieval rood screen was extended by three bays to the north. In 1843, the chancel roof was renewed, as were the furnishings in the church, including the font.

From 1846-1847, the south nave aisle was duplicated by John Hayward, creating a rare instance of double aisles. Hayward continued with a programme of rebuilding in 1849, with the renewal or replacement of many of the church windows, including the large four-light east window and those in the south aisle and porch. The most significant alteration in 1849, however, was the rebuilding of the tower and spire, again by Hayward, at a cost of some £3,400 (equivalent in 2021 to some £375,000). Some medieval material from the original tower was reused, supplemented with new stone. Following the completion of Hayward's scheme in 1849, the church has changed little since.

=== 20th century ===
In 1928, the west gallery was partially dismantled and reorganised to form a tower screen, using some of the medieval carvings in the former gallery. In 1981, the organ was moved to its present position in the north aisle.

In November 1998, a nearby fireworks factory in the village suffered a severe fire, culminating in a powerful explosion, damaging many buildings in the village and shattering windows some distance from the factory. More than £300,000 of damage was caused to the church by the explosion, including to the tower pinnacles, church roofs, windows and organ.

== Architecture ==
=== Exterior ===
Described by Nikolaus Pevsner as "externally, a striking church", the building's chief feature is the tall spire. Rising to a height of 120 feet (37 m) and designed by John Hayward, it is visible from many of the surrounding hills. Along with the chimney of nearby Coldharbour Mill, it forms the village's most visible landmark. The church has a traditional plan, with west tower and spire, nave with north and south aisles (the latter forming a rare double aisle) and north and south porches. The exterior is mostly constructed from rubbled limestone, with slate for the roofs.

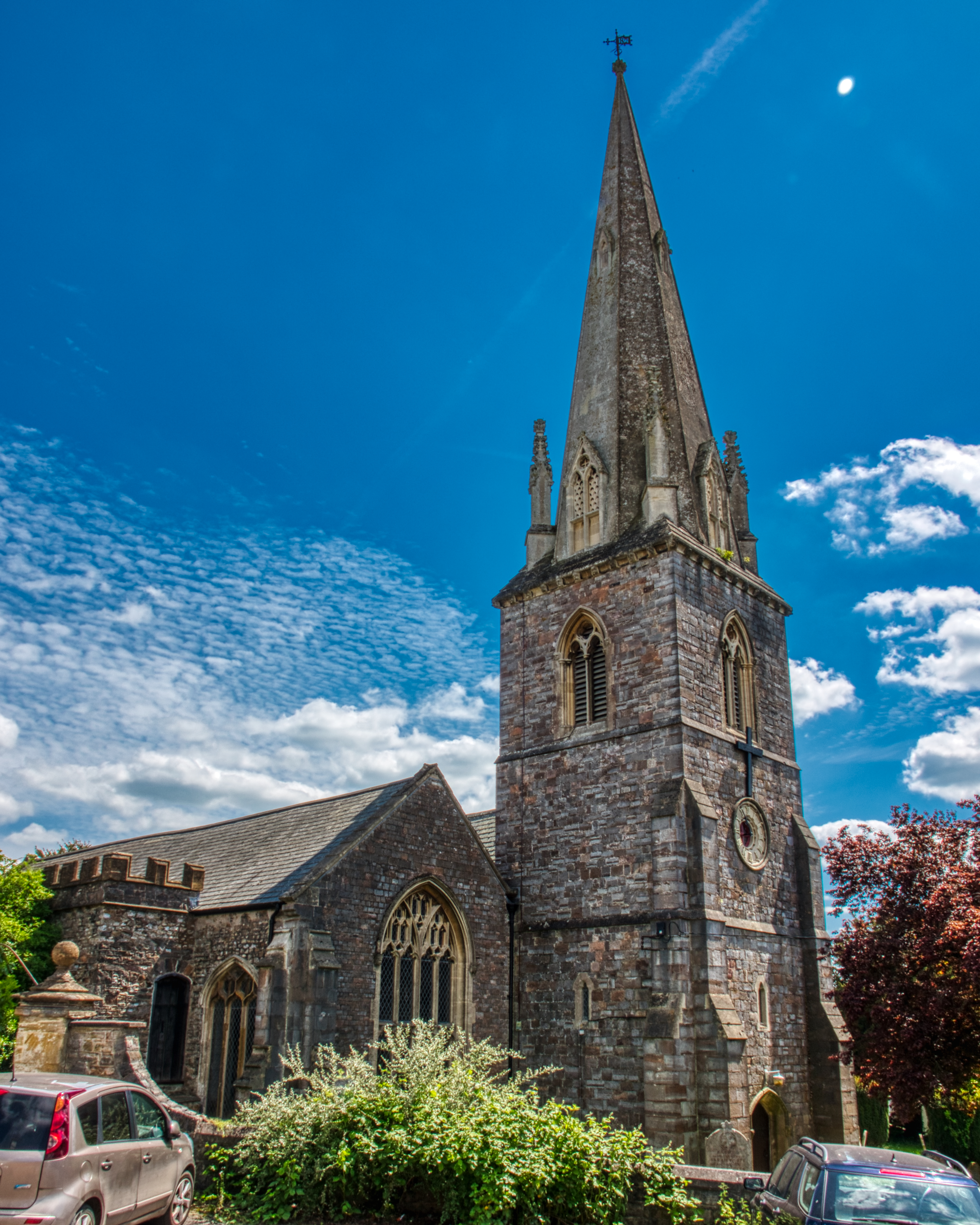
Tower, spire and north aisle

The tower is formed of three stages, with corner buttresses. It mainly dates to the 1849 rebuild by Hayward, but does feature some medieval material. The lower stage has a centred west doorway with hood mould, and small lancet windows to all but the eastern face. The middle stage has a clock in its western face, contained with a recessed stone roundel, the centre of which has some clear glass to light the chamber inside. The belfry stage has two-light Decorated Gothic-style bell openings with slate louvres. A corbel table above the belfry openings supports the spire above. The spire, of the broach design, is rare in Devon, and like the tower, dates to 1849. It has large corner pinnacles and two-light pierced stone openings in its lower stage. The spire is surmounted by a weathercock.

The north aisle, formed of five bays, is one of the oldest parts of the building. It has a four-light Perpendicular style window from the 19th century in its western face, and three-light windows in its northern face, some of which contain medieval glass. There is a battlemented porch in the 2nd bay of the aisle, with an external staircase door, and a three-light east window.

The outermost south aisle, the only one of the two south aisles to be visible from the outside, dates from 1847, and is a copy of the medieval original, now the inner south aisle. Like the north aisle, it also has a four-light window in its western face, has three-light windows to the south face but also has a four-light window to the east. The chancel has a large four-light east window with transom, dating to 1849.

=== Interior ===
The south porch forms the main entrance to the church, where one enters into the outer south aisle. The outer south aisle, a copy of the 15th century inner south aisle, has wavy moulding to the arches and piers and a wagon roof. The inner aisle is identical, except for a late 19th century panelled roof. The north arcade and aisle differs from the south considerably, with older, rounder and plainer piers, featuring double chamfered arches, circular piers and moulded capitals. Like the central nave, it has a moulded plaster ceiling. The west end of the nave features a spectacular Elizabethan wooden tower screen with numerous highly detailed carvings.

Between the chancel and the nave is the church's most famous furnishing, the rood screen. Dating to the early 15th century and with a length of 67 feet (20.4 m), it is the oldest and largest rood screen in Devon. Formed of seventeen bays, the rood screen was extended 1828 with such high quality work, the extension is virtually indistinguishable from the medieval core. The screen retains its original red and green paint, and features elaborate ribbed vaulting with covings and cornices.

The chancel is a Victorian Gothic creation, with a large four-light window and wagon roof. The roof is painted a vibrant red, with stone braces to the wagon vault. Where these braces meet, there are decorative, gilded stone bosses. There is a highly decorated stone reredos below the east window, featuring carvings designed by Hayward, as well as a piscina.

The church has numerous other furnishings and monuments, including a pulpit from 1715, a polygonal stone font from 1843 by Samuel Knight, and several tombs. The most notable of these tombs are those in the Walrond Chapel, dating to between 1630 and 1790. The tombs in the chapel have ornate, brightly coloured carvings and busts.

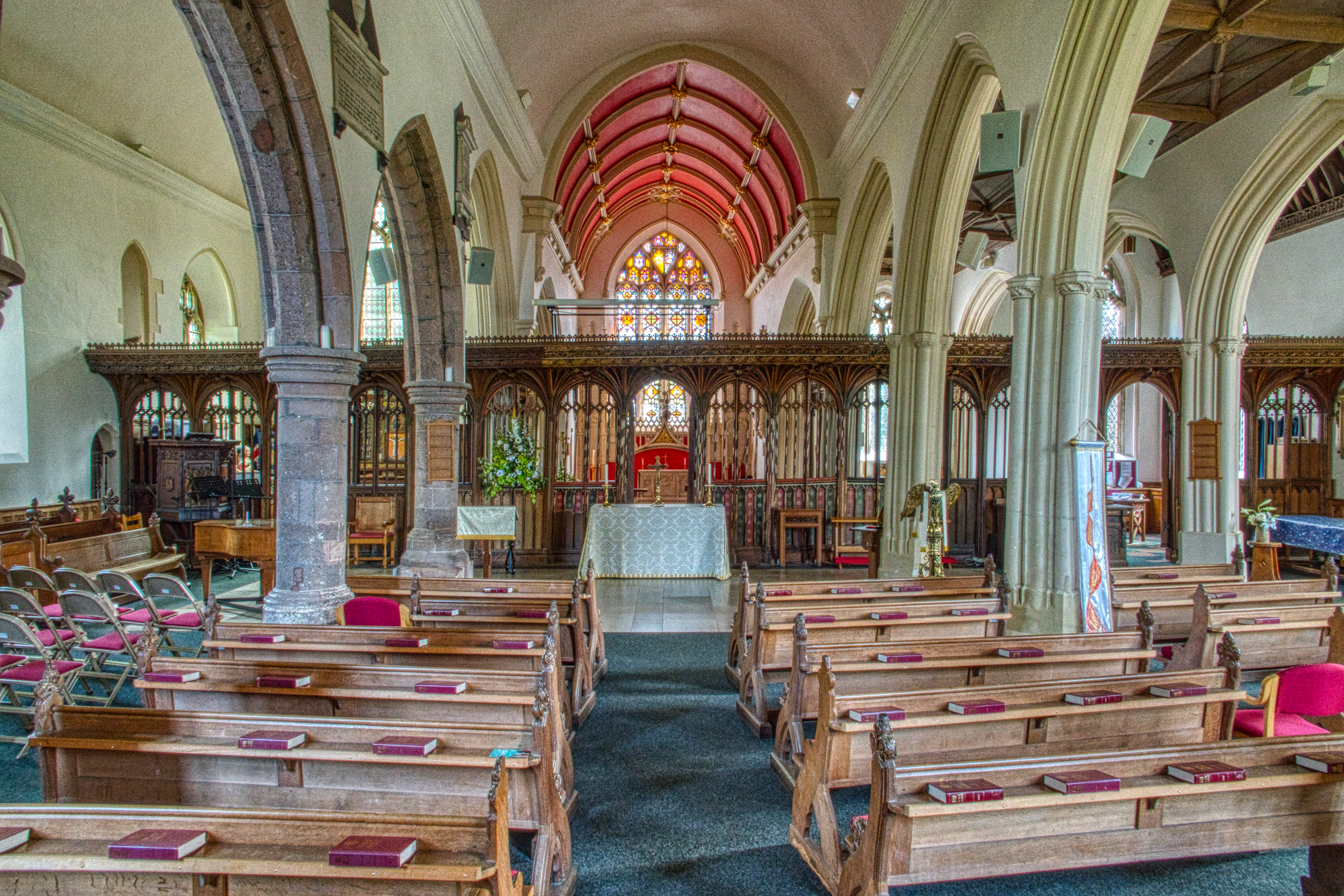
Nave, looking east, showing double aisles to the south (right)

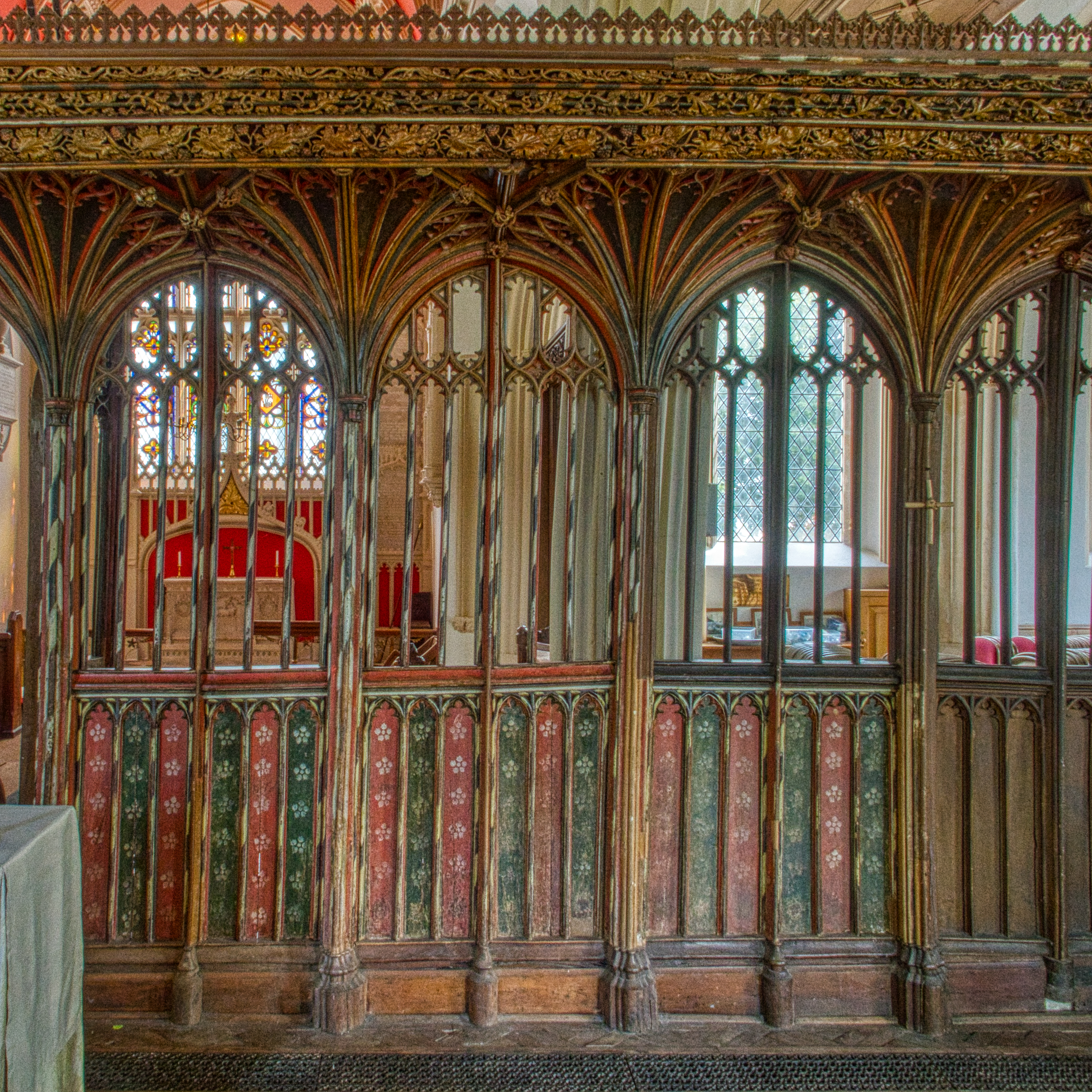
Rood screen (early 15th century)

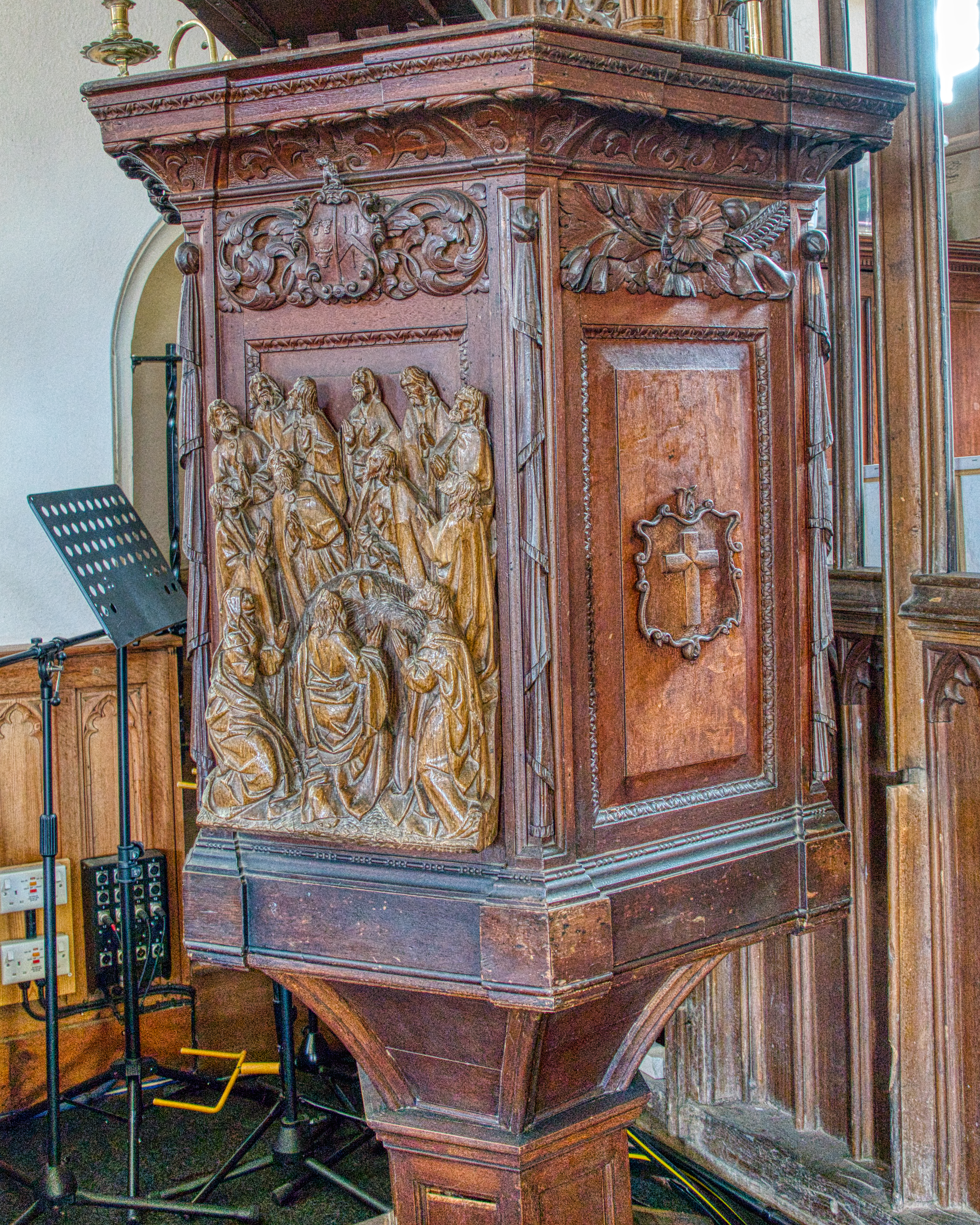
18th century polygonal pulpit

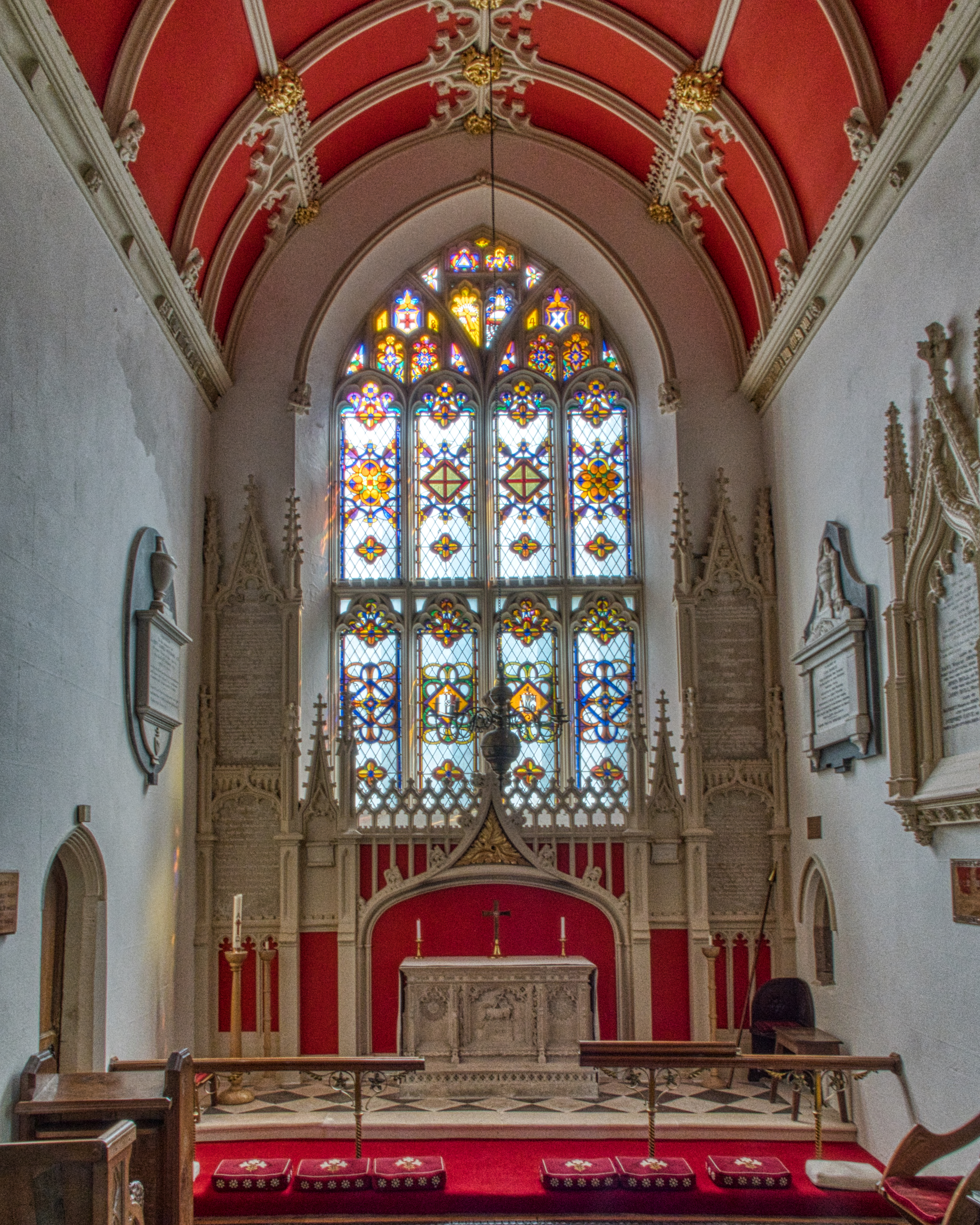
Chancel, by Hayward

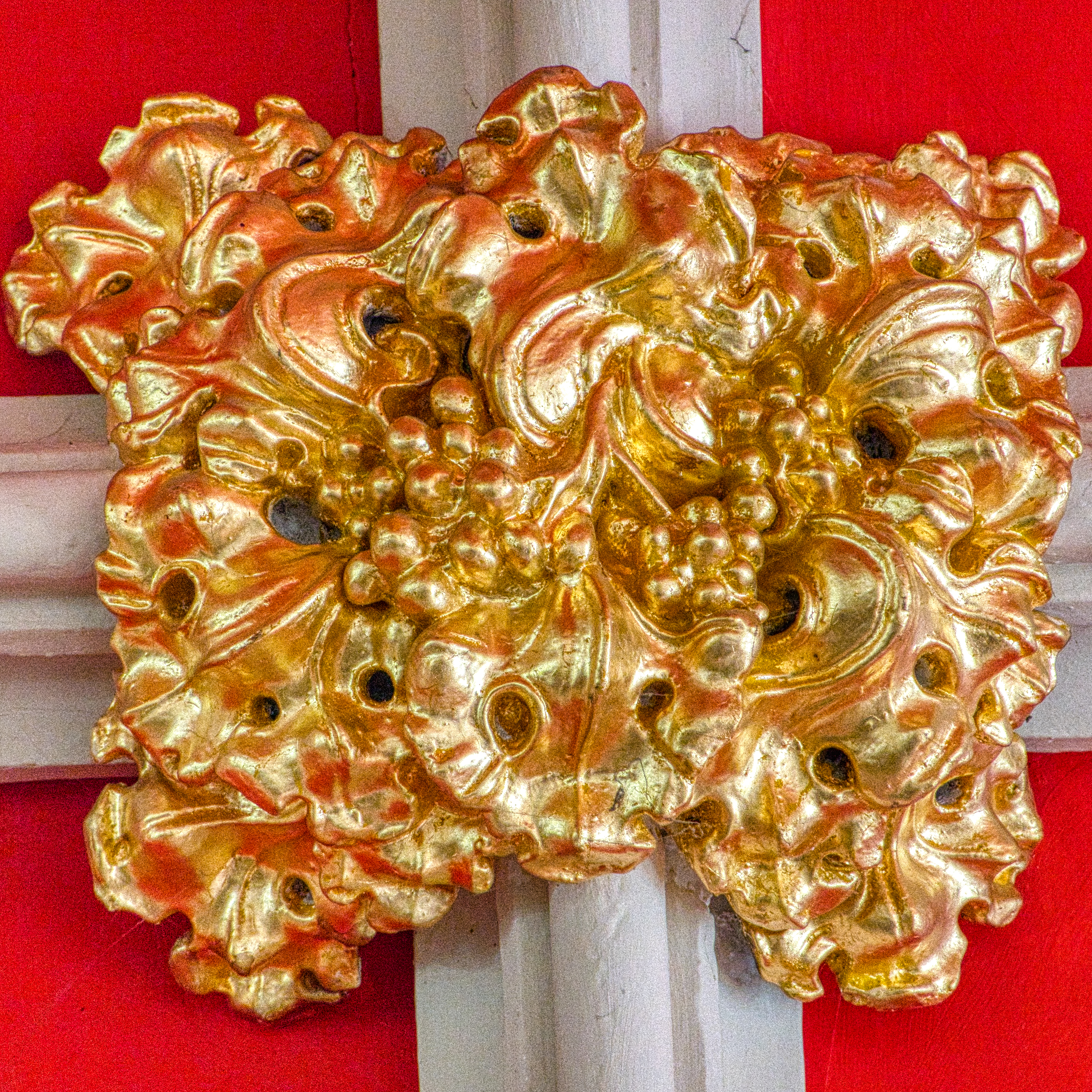
Chancel roof boss

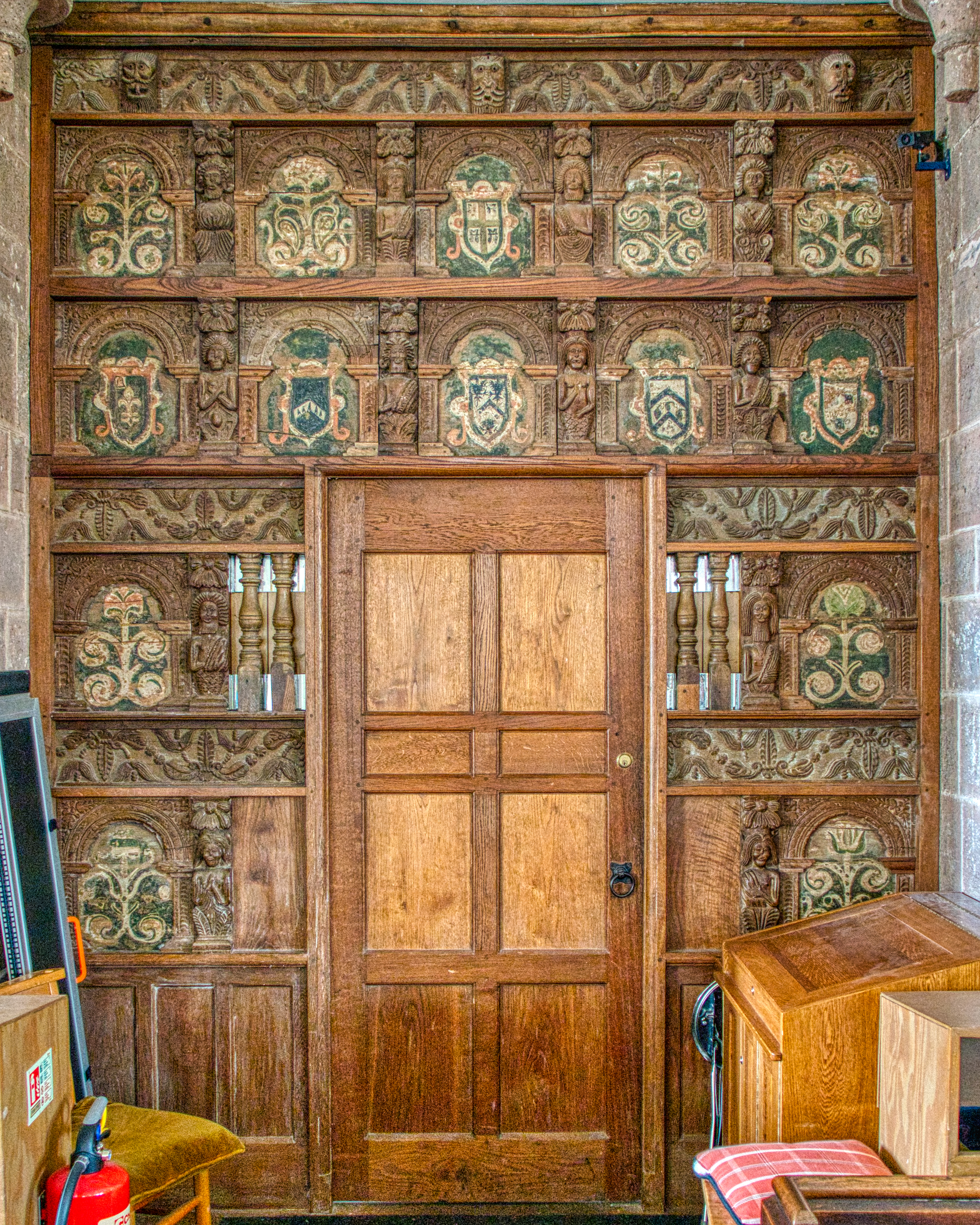
Elizabethan tower screen

== Organ ==
The first recorded organ in the church dates back to 1841, when T. R. Robson of London constructed a small instrument for £316, sited in the west gallery. In 1902 this was moved to behind the choir stalls. In 1928, the organ was enlarged and rebuilt by Osmond & Co of Taunton, before being rebuilt again in 1981 by Percy Daniel & Co of Clevedon. The organ was moved at this time to its present position in the north aisle.

In the 1998 Uffculme factory explosion, damage was caused to the organ by falling debris and it was dismantled, repaired and rebuilt by Hele & Co of Plymouth. The casework was also renewed at this time. The organ now has two manuals and pedalboard, with 15 speaking stops.

== Bells ==
In 1801, Thomas Bilbie III of Cullompton recast the existing ring of five bells into a ring of six. The particulars of the ring of five prior to 1801 are unknown, as the recorded inscriptions of the bells made no reference to bells prior to this, only that they had been recast. In 1847, Charles and George Mears of the Whitechapel Bell Foundry in London recast the treble and tenor bells, retuning the others.

No further work took place on the bells until 1927, when John Taylor & Co of Loughborough recast all six bells and added two new bells to make a ring of eight. All eight bells received new fittings, including cast iron headstocks, wrought-iron clappers and ball bearings. The bells were hung in a new two-tier cast iron frame, with the 2nd and the four largest bells on the lower tier, with the treble, 3rd and 4th on the upper tier. The bearings and clappers were overhauled in 2010. The bells are considered amongst the finest in the West Country and are well-used by visiting bands of ringers.
