= Hele, Devon =

Village in Devon, England

Coordinates: 50.813°N 3.430°W

Hele
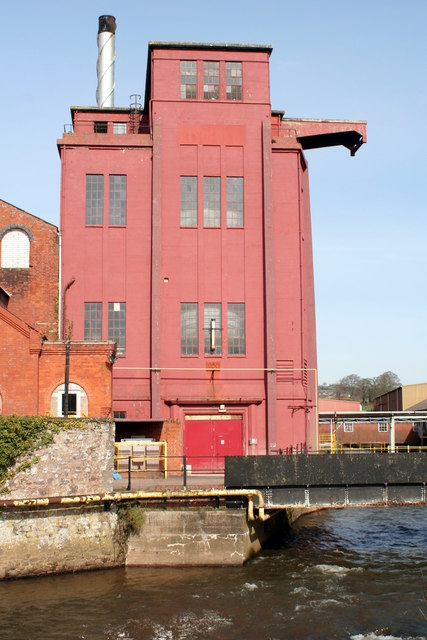
- The old mill at Hele

- Location within Devon
- OS grid reference: SS9902
- Civil parish: Bradninch
- Shire county: Devon
- Region: South West
- Country: England
- Sovereign state: United Kingdom

Hele is a village in Devon, England, lying about one mile (1.6 km) SSW of Bradninch and 10 miles (16 km) NNE of Exeter, on the River Culm.

The village is home to a paper mill once belonging to the company Wiggins Teape, now part of the multinational company Purico Group. The Devon Valley Mill produces sausage casing paper and teabag paper under the "Crompton Paper" brand name.

The mill site was originally that of a flour mill which was converted to a paper mill in 1762. It was here that John Dewdney produced the first glazed writing paper in England in the 1840s. He was also famously called upon to supply the paper for the catalogues of the Great Exhibition in 1851.

The nearby railway station, now closed, used to serve Hele and Bradninch.
