= Stoke Canon =

Village and civil parish in Devon, England

Coordinates: 50°46′N 3°30′W

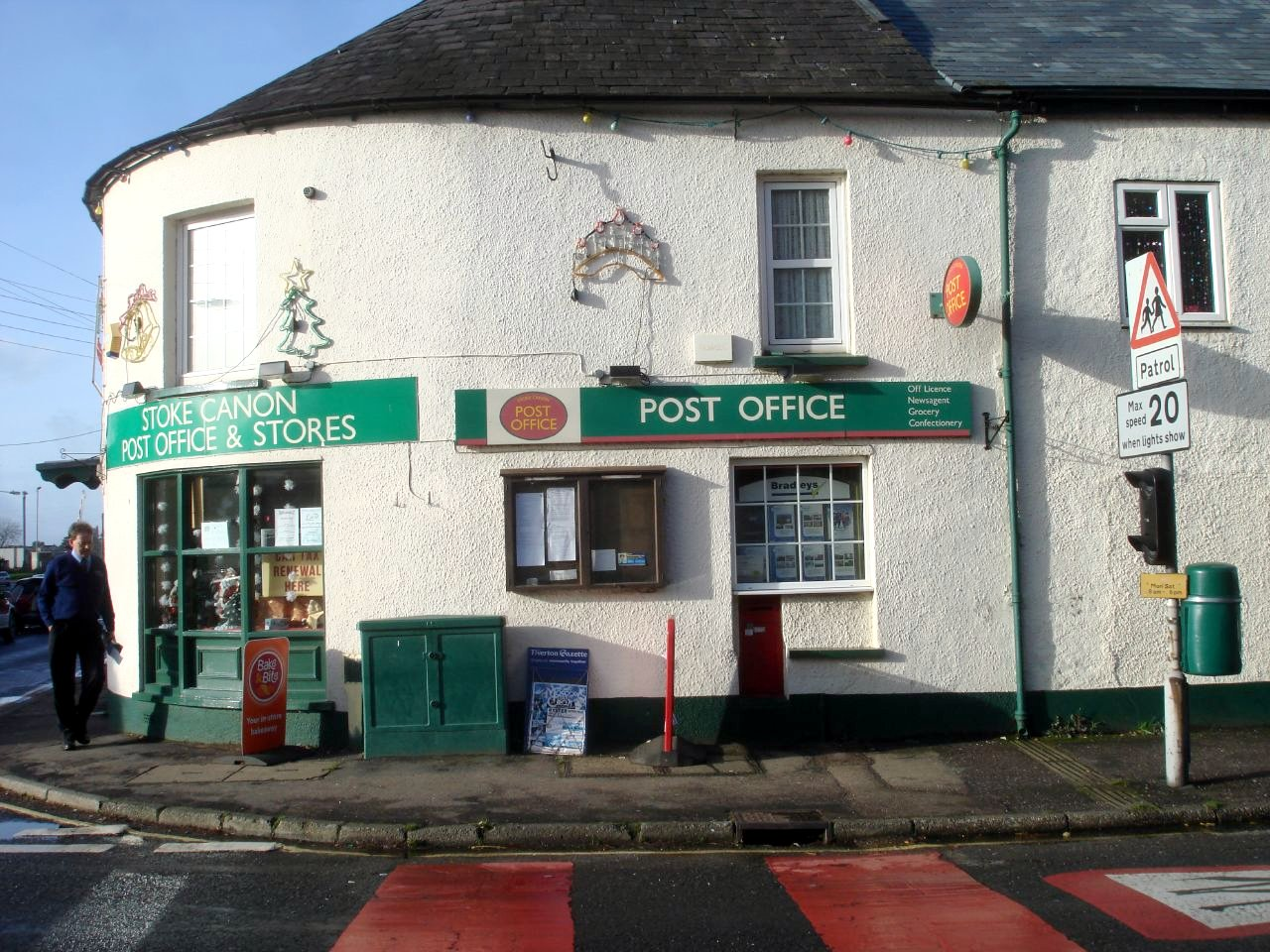
Stoke Canon Post Office

Stoke Canon is a small village and civil parish near the confluence of the rivers Exe and Culm on the main A396 between Exeter and Tiverton in the English county of Devon, and the district of East Devon. At the 2001 census, it had a population of 660. The population was unchanged in 2011 but the village forms the major part of the Exe Valley electoral ward. The population of this ward was 2,041 at the 2011 Census.

There is a pub, The Stoke Canon Inn, and a post office and general stores in the centre of the village.

== The church ==
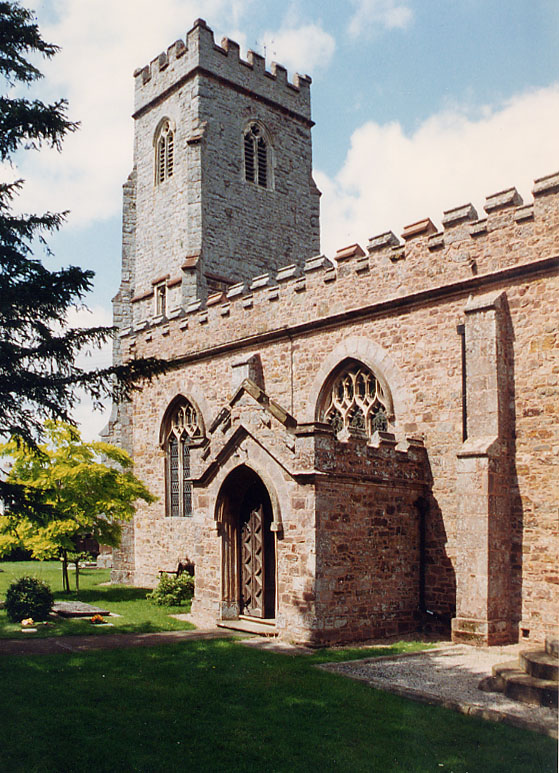
St Mary Magdalene's church, Stoke Canon

The Church of St. Mary Magdalene was wholly rebuilt in 1836, except for the west tower, at the cost of £1000. The interior is neatly fitted up, and the tower has a clock and four bells. It contains a Norman font, made from a single block of lava, and a number of 17th-century floor slabs to local families.

It was here in 1666, at this 14th-century church, that George Boone III, grandfather of Daniel Boone, the American pioneer and frontiersman, was baptised.

== History ==
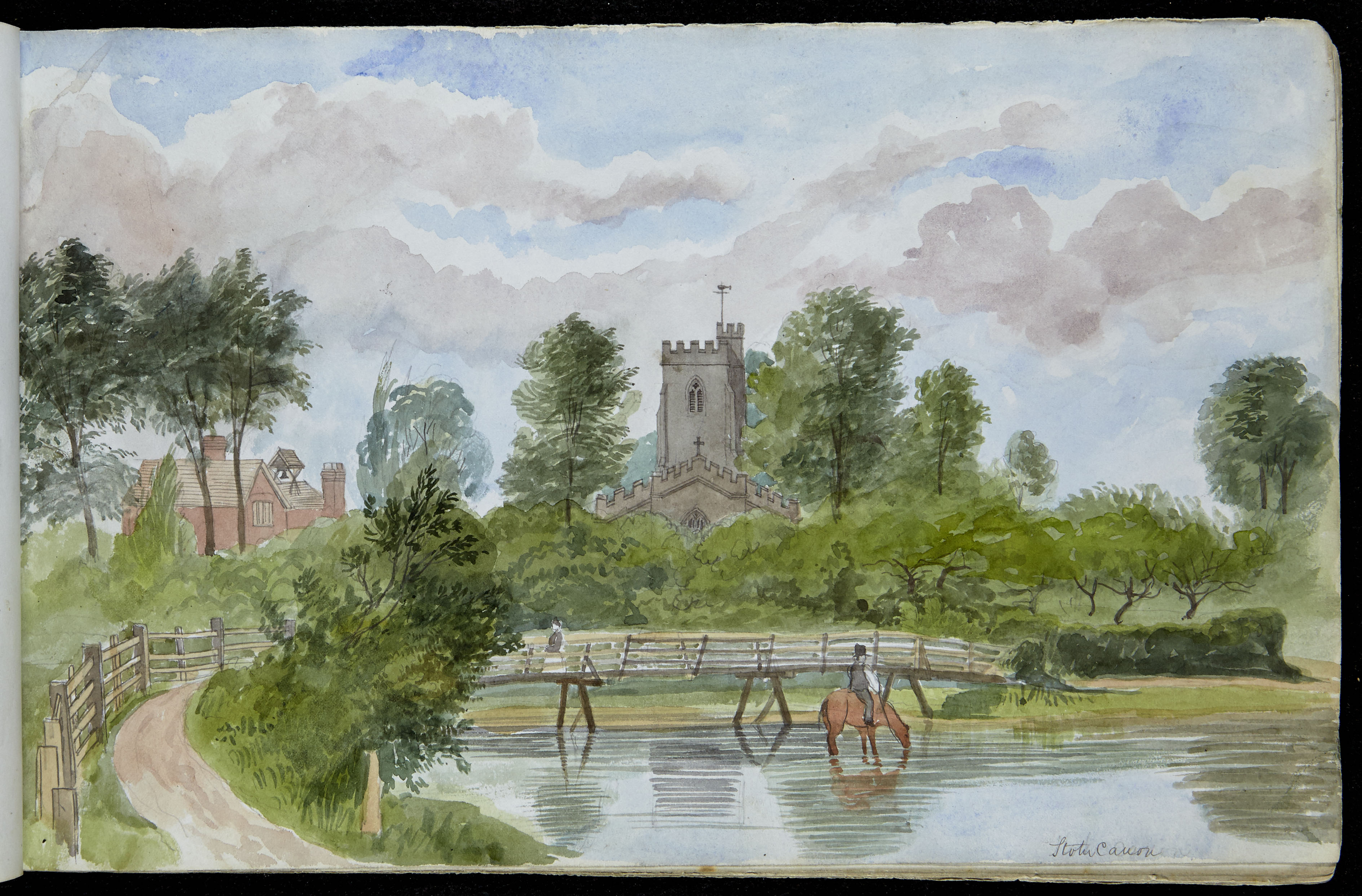
Stoke Canon, Devon, watercolour by Edward Ashworth between 1843 and 1933

The manor was given by King Athelstan to Exeter Cathedral, and still belongs to the Dean and Chapter. A charter, still in existence, records the grant of land at Stoke Canon by King Cnut to the King’s minister Hunewine in the year 1033.

In April, 1847, a hot cinder, blown from one of the railway engines, ignited the thatched roof of a row of cottages, and the fire spread until 24 dwellings, including the parsonage house, were destroyed.

In 1966 there was still a working water mill producing stone ground flour, and another one producing paper.

Despite being so close to the River Exe, the village had not been known to flood until at least 1967 even though it was nicknamed (by Exeter residents) as "Stoke Canon where the floods are", it used to stand out as an island.

== The bridge ==
Stoke Canon Bridge, which stretches over two arms of the River Culm, was already built in the late 13th century. Bishop Stapeldon left money in his will (1326) for its upkeep. It contains some old work but has been much widened to carry the main road.

== The railway station ==
A station opened to serve Stoke Canon in 1860 with staggered platforms. The up platform was north of the level crossing; the down platform was to the south.

On 1 May 1885 the Exe Valley branch was opened from a junction slightly south of the station. This was relocated further south so that it could serve both lines from 1 July 1894. As with most stations on the Taunton to Exeter line, the platforms were moved apart in 1932 to accommodate new loop lines, and the branch was given its own side of the up platform so that trains could run on to the branch while a train stood in the up loop.

The site can still be recognised from passing trains. The station closed on 13 June 1960.

== Notable residents ==
Percy Fawcett lived in Osmond House in the 1920s, before his last trip and disappearance in Amazonia.
