= River Culm =

River in Devon, England

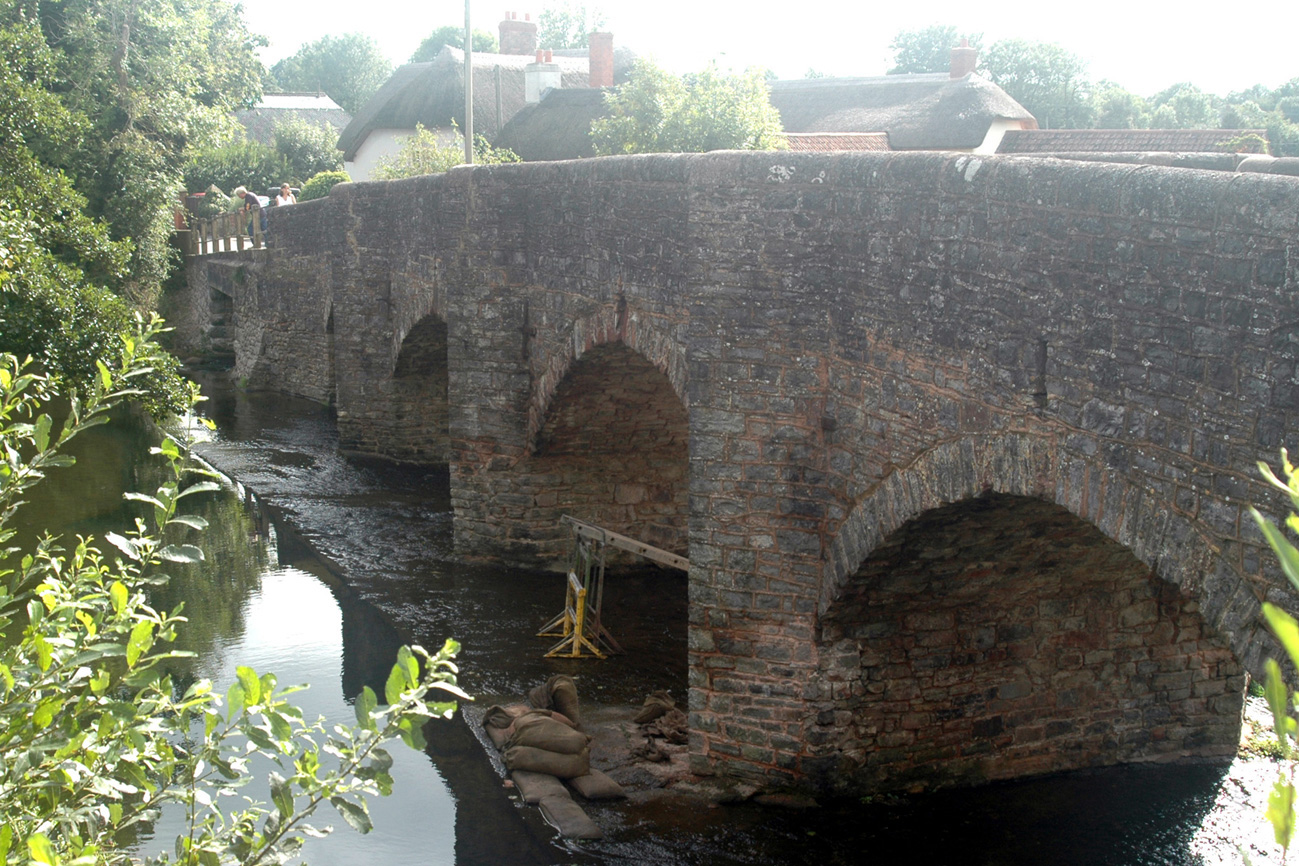
- River Culm at Culmstock

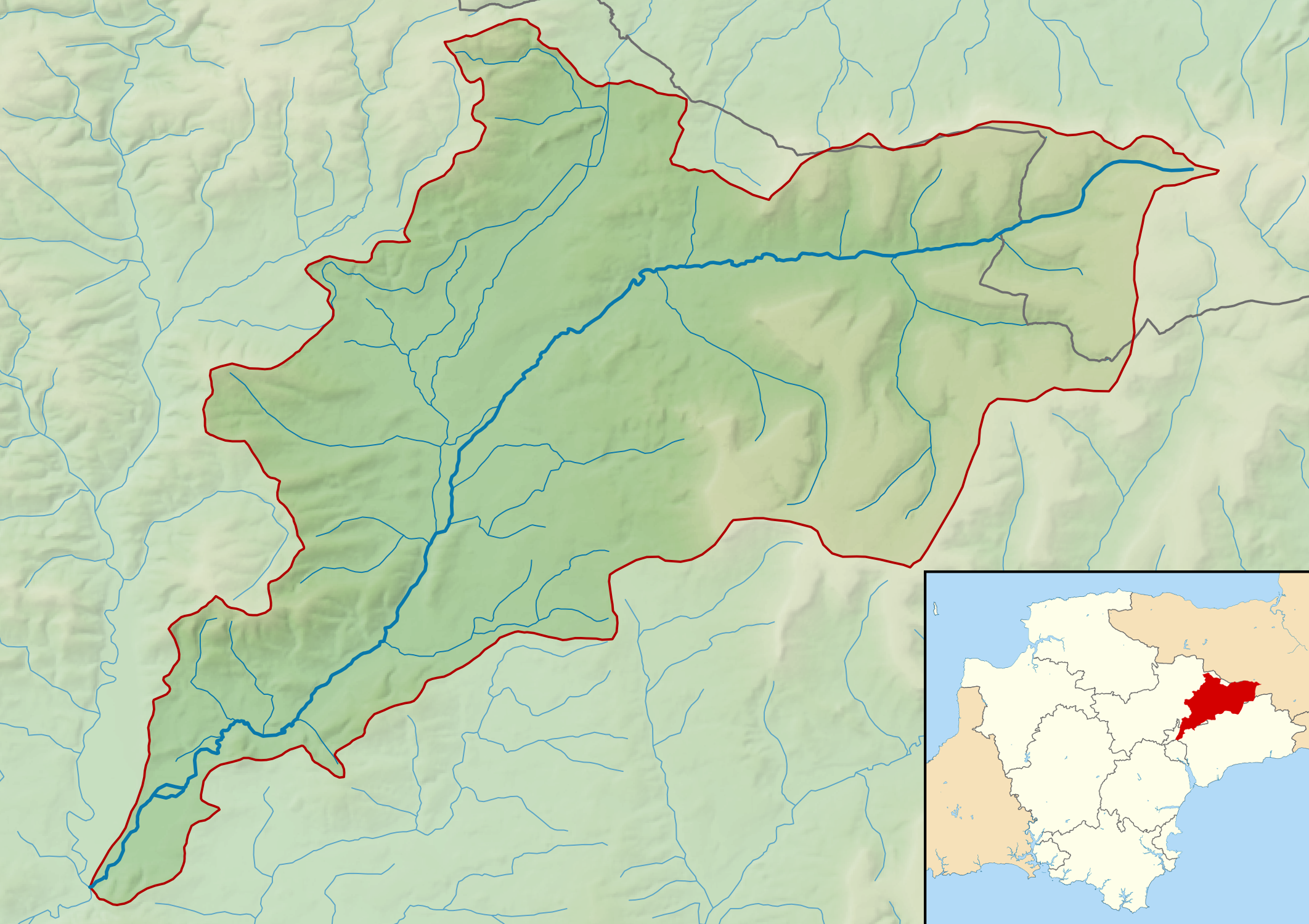
- Map of the River Culm and its catchment in Devon and Somerset, UK, with the inset showing the location in Devon.

Location
- Country: England
- County: Devon
- Town: Cullompton

Physical characteristics
- Source: Culmhead
  - coordinates: 50.93778°N 3.109821°W
  - elevation: 800 ft (240 m)
- Mouth: River Exe
  - coordinates: 50.7625°N 3.515°W
- Length: 17 mi (27 km)
- Discharge
  - location: Wood Mill
  - average: 3.77 m^{3}/s (133 cu ft/s)

The River Culm flows through the Devon Redlands in Devon, England and is the longest tributary of the River Exe. It rises in the Blackdown Hills at a spring near RAF Culmhead in Somerset, and flows west through Hemyock, then Culmstock (in the Culm Valley) to Uffculme. The river turns south, through Cullompton (and alongside the M5 motorway), skirting the northern boundary of Killerton Park to join the River Exe on the north-western outskirts of Exeter. The name of the river is thought to mean 'knot' or 'tie', in reference to the river's twists and loops.

== Course of the river ==
The River Culm begins in a marshy field near Culmhead (picture 1). Four and a half miles from its source the river (OS ST17501455) is 1.5m wide (picture 2). At Gladhayes the river passes under a two-arched bridge (picture 3). About half a mile further the river is joined by the waters of Madford River. From here the river continues to Culmstock, a village straddling both sides of the river where the river is shallower. At Uffculme the river flows in a straight course and flows more slowly. The Spratford Steam, whose waters have flowed in a southerly direction, meets the Culm near Willand, and thereafter the river shares its valley with the present main railway line (former Great Western Railway) from Taunton to Exeter. The M5 motorway runs beside the railway, and all three continue past the market town of Cullompton. The river meanders a lot here and is prone to flooding. Shortly prior to reaching Hele - near Kensham House - the small River Weaver flows into the Culm from the east. It passes under a paper mill at Hele. North of Stoke Canon the river has many meanders. Shedding the motorway to the south of Hele, the river and the railway continue together into Exeter, although by then the Culm has joined the River Exe - just below Stoke Canon (picture 4).

== The Culm in literature ==
The novel Perlycross by R.D. Blackmore is based on the Upper Culm Valley. Perlycombe is Hemyock, Perlycross is Culmstock and Perliton is Uffculme.

Perlycombe, Perlycross and Perliton, are but as three pearls on one string, all in a line, and contiguous. The string is the stream; which arising at the eastern extermity of Perlycombe parish, passes through the village, then westward through Perlycross, and westward still through the much larger village of Perliton. At Perlycombe it is a noisy little brook, at Perlycross, a genial trout stream; while Perliton, by the time it gets there, entitles it "the River Perle" and keeps two boats upon it, which are not always more aground than landsmen should desire.

== Gallery ==
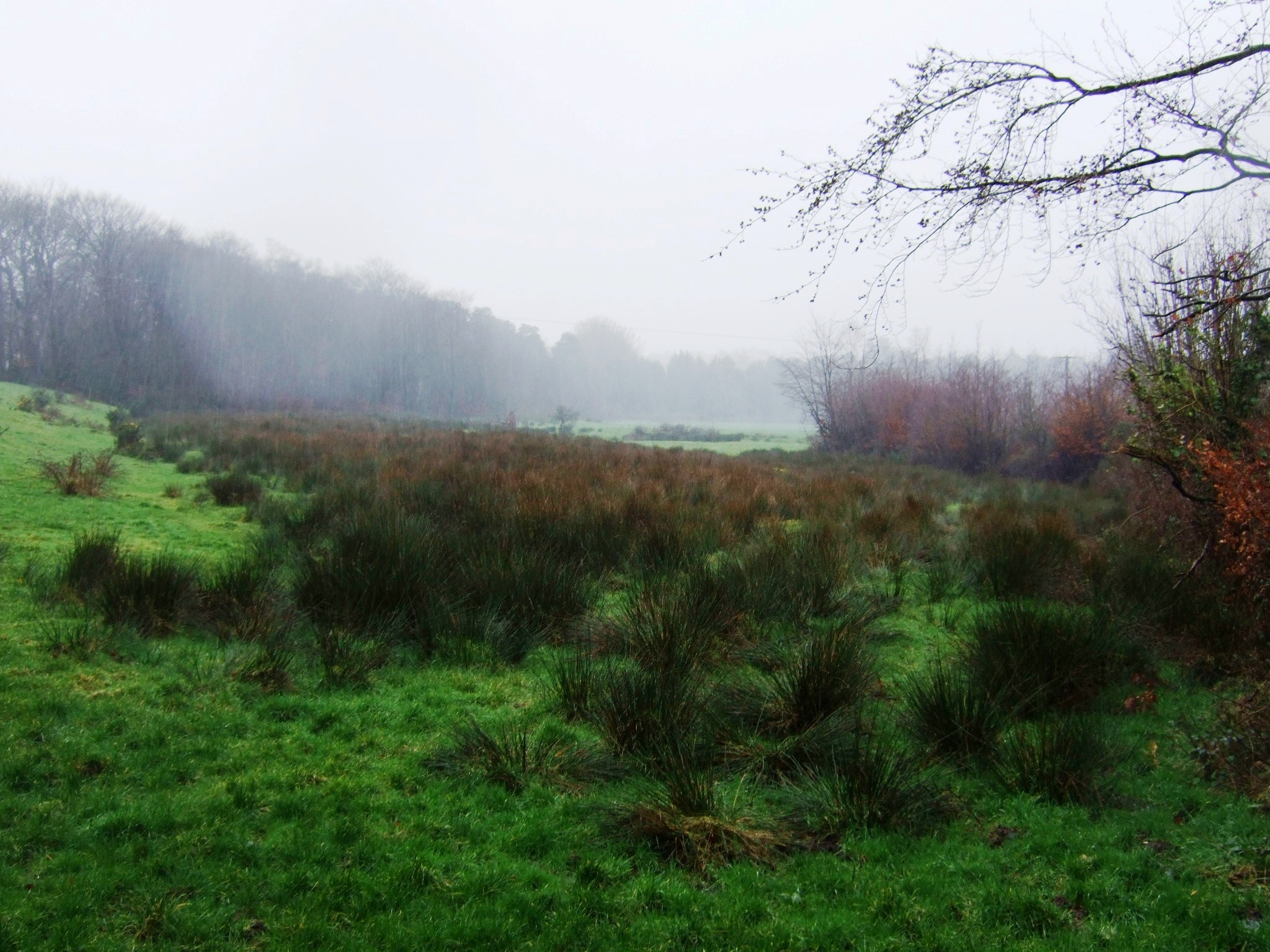
1. River source.

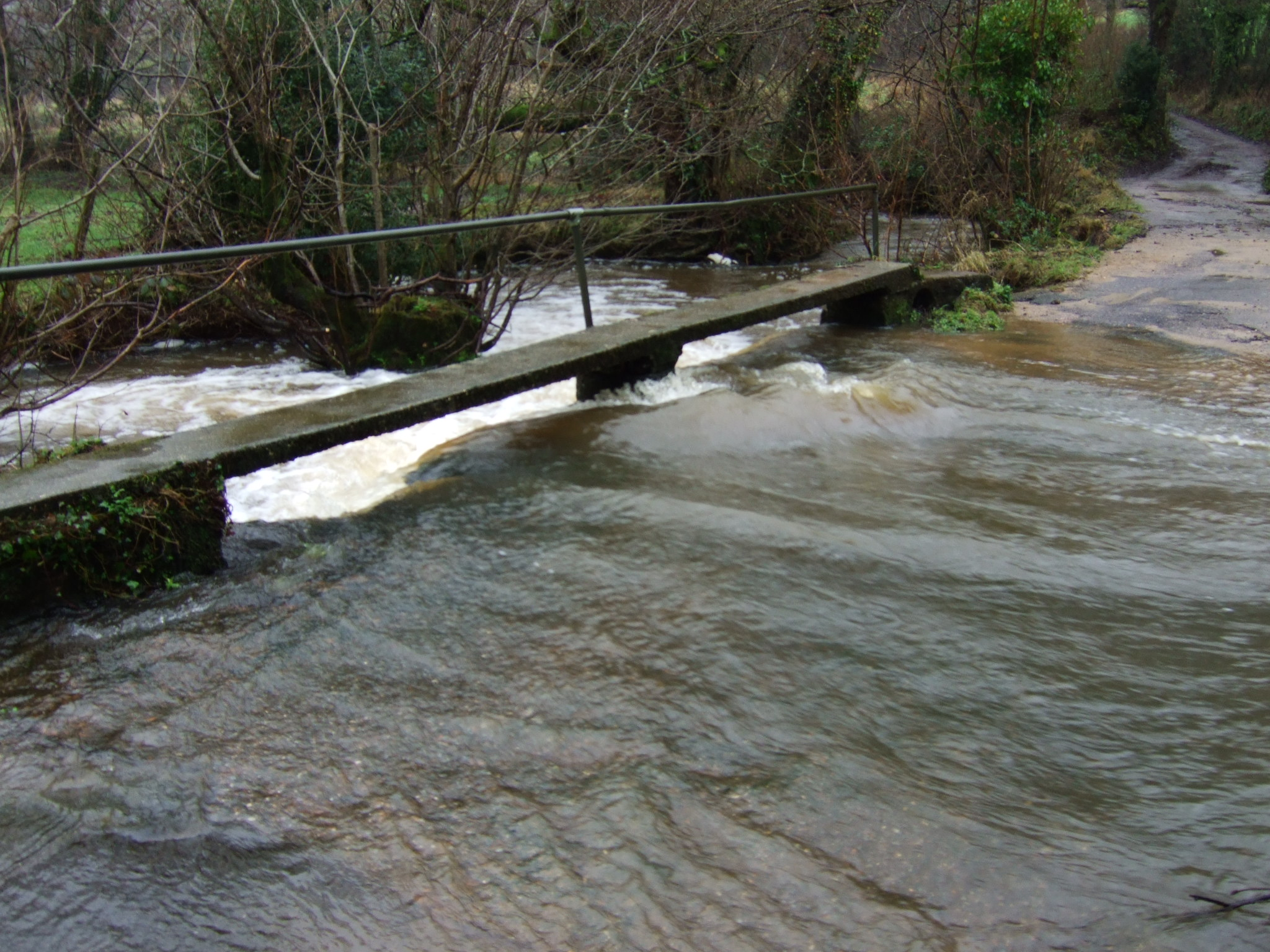
2. The first ford of the River Culm.

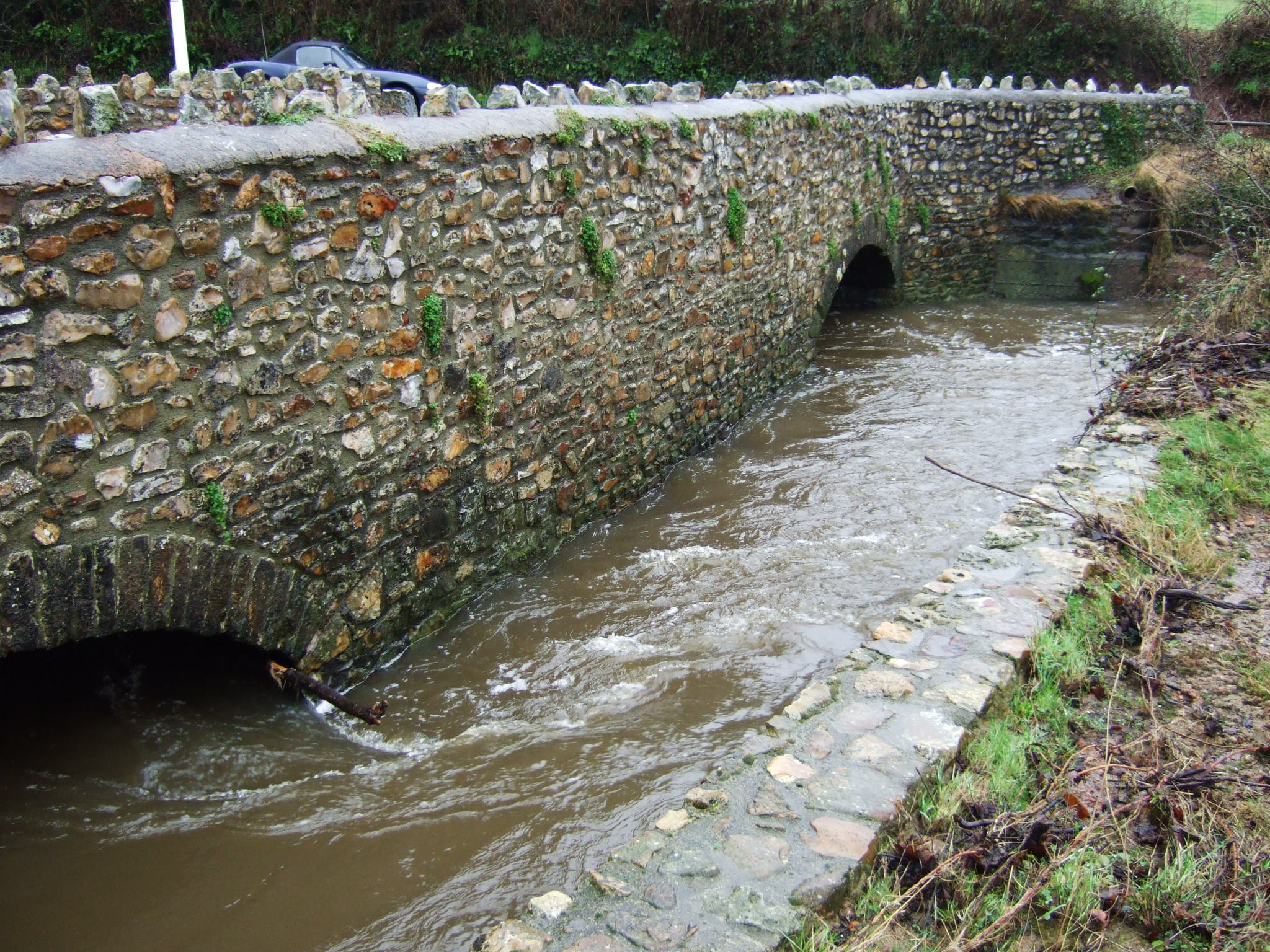
3. The bridge at Gladhayes.

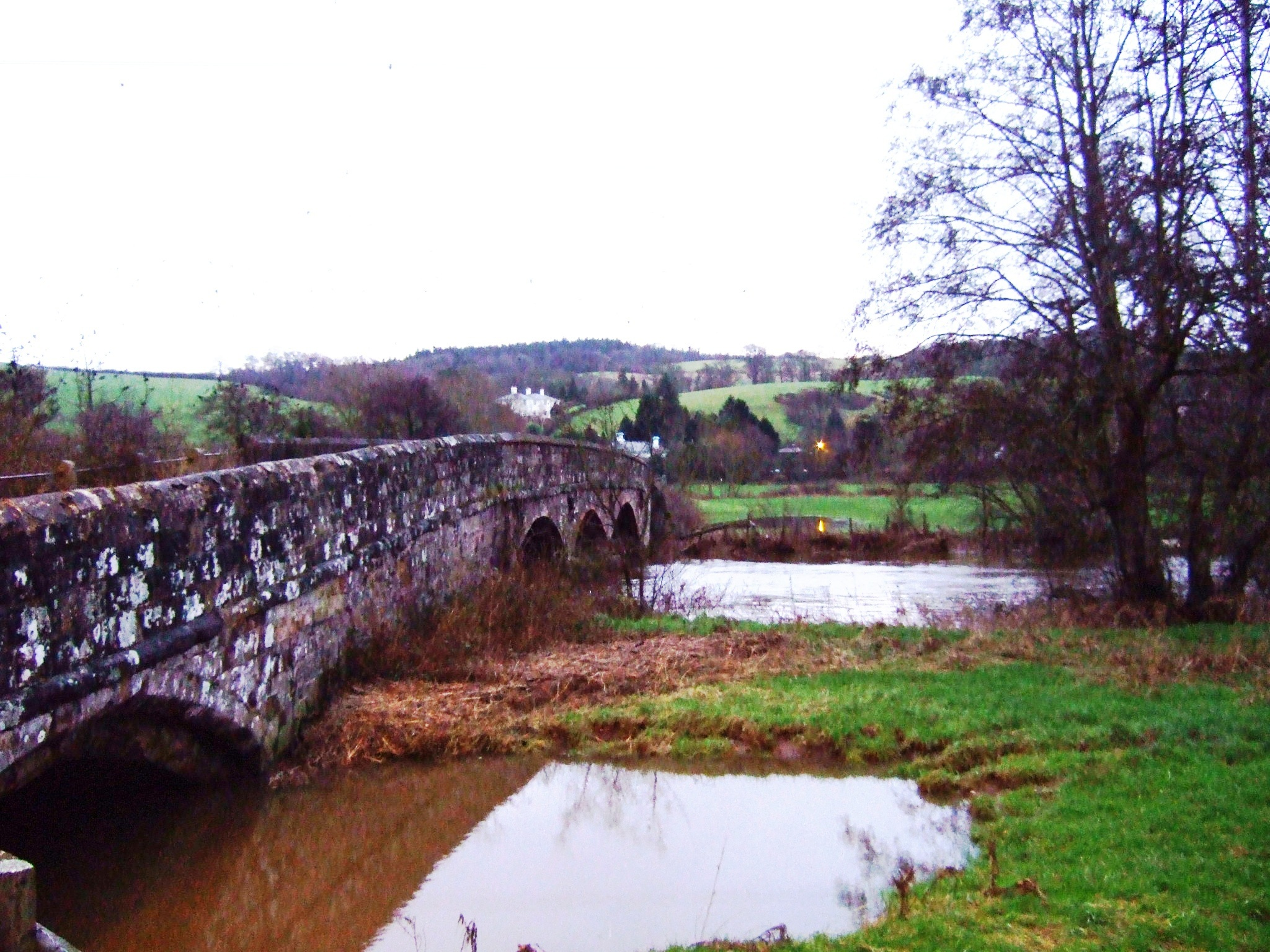
4. The last bridge.

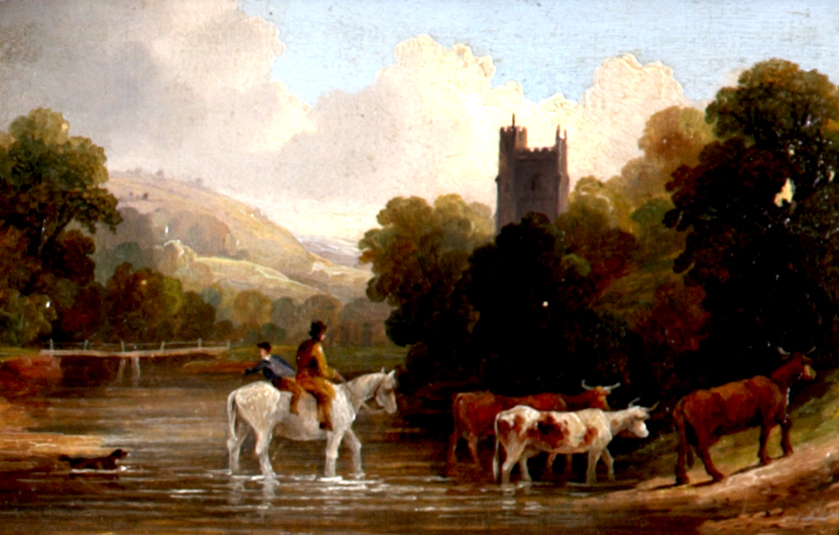
Rewe, Devon, 1860s oil painting by John Wallace Tucker, depicting River Culm, at Rewe
