= Uffculme railway station =

Former railway station in England

General information
- Location: Devon; England
- Coordinates: 50.905538°N 3.324729°W
- Platforms: 1

Other information
- Status: Disused

History
- Original company: Culm Valley Light Railway
- Pre-grouping: Great Western Railway

Key dates
- 29 May 1876: Station opened
- 9 September 1963: Station closed
Location

Uffculme railway station was the station closest to the centre of the Culm Valley Light Railway in Devon and as such contained the passing loop. The line ran approximately 9 miles (14 km) from the Bristol to Penzance main line at Tiverton Junction to Hemyock on the Somerset border.

Since closure the station area has been totally redeveloped.

== Description ==
Uffculme station had a single platform with a loop, and a goods yard was opposite the passenger platform with had two sidings accessed from the loop. One of these served a loading dock with cattle pens.

== Closure ==
The Great Western Railway bought the line in April 1880 and opened it to freight after it became clear that it was unlikely to ever run profitably as a passenger line. Until grouping it operated as a joint freight line .

The line was planned for closure when the Beeching Report of 1963 was issued. After closure to passengers in 1963 the station remained open to freight traffic with only the goods yard and loop remaining in use until 8 May 1967, The line remained open until 1975 when it was abandoned.
