= Uffculme =

Village in Mid Devon, England

Coordinates: 50.9064°N 3.3266°W

- Village
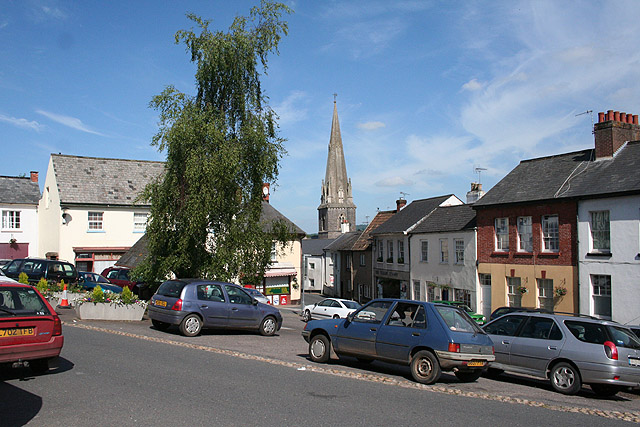
- Village square
- Area: 24.88 km^{2} (9.61 sq mi) (Parish)
- Population: 3,090 (2020 estimate)
  - Density: 124.2/km
- OS grid reference: ST0612
- District: Mid Devon
- Shire county: Devon
- Region: South West
- Country: England
- Sovereign state: United Kingdom
- Post town: CULLOMPTON
- Postcode district: EX15
- Dialling code: 01884
- Police: Devon and Cornwall
- Fire: Devon and Somerset
- Ambulance: South Western
- UK Parliament: Tiverton and Minehead

Uffculme (/ˈʌfkəm/, UF-kəm) is a village and civil parish located in the Mid Devon district of Devon, England. Situated in the Blackdown Hills on the B3440, close to the M5 motorway and the Bristol–Exeter railway line, near Cullompton, Uffculme is on the upper reaches of the River Culm. The population of the parish, according to a 2020 estimate, is 3,090. It is surrounded, clockwise from the north, by the parishes of Culmstock, Hemyock, Sheldon, Kentisbeare, Cullompton, Willand, Halberton and Burlescombe.

== History ==
Historically, Uffculme was a parish in Bampton Hundred, under the Peculiar jurisdiction of the Prebendary of Uffculme, Salisbury Cathedral. Uffculme is of particular interest to local historians because the wills and inventories for Uffculme have survived due to the parish being a peculiar of the Bishop of Salisbury, and hence they were not among the Devon probate records that were destroyed by fire in Exeter following a bombing raid during the Baedeker Blitz of World War II.

The earliest (1801) census put the population of Uffculme parish at 1837. From the 16th century, Uffculme was a significant part of the West Country's wool industry, reaching its height in the middle of the 18th century "when large quantities of Uffculme serges were exported to Holland by the Tiverton merchants". Coldharbour Mill, the last woollen mill to operate in the village was built in 1799 by Thomas Fox. In 1983, Coldharbour Mill was opened as a working museum.

On 17 November 1998 a major explosion occurred at a fireworks factory in the village. Windows of homes near to the plant were broken by the blast, which could be heard 10 miles (16 km) away in Tiverton. £300,000 of damage to the roof of St Mary's Church was caused but there were no serious injuries. The firework company later pleaded guilty to six charges under the Health and Safety at Work etc. Act 1974. The firm resumed trading a week after the blast and continued until December 2003 when it went into liquidation.

== Geography ==
The Culm Valley Light Railway, which opened in 1876, had two stations in the village; Coldharbour Halt and Uffculme railway station. The railway, operating between Tiverton Junction railway station and Hemyock closed to passenger traffic in 1963, and completely in 1975. A path on the route to Coldharbour Mill takes in the old railway bridge.

== Culture ==
A grammar school known as "Uffculme Free-School" was founded in 1701 by Nicholas Ayshford, of nearby Ayshford Court, Burlescombe, who endowed it with £47 per annum. Uffculme now has two schools - Uffculme Primary School, and a secondary - Uffculme School which specialises in mathematics and computing. Uffculme School became an academy in 2010 and was rated 'outstanding' by Ofsted in 2014.

The large Elizabethan manor house of Bradfield, with Victorian extension, the historic home of the Walrond family, is situated within the parish of Uffculme. The other utilities include a public house (The Ostler), a male-only working men's club (the Uffculme Men's Institute), three churches, some shops and a take away which sells various foods. There is also a vet's surgery, library, Co-op and post office / general stores. Coldharbour Mill remains a popular tourist attraction, with its working wool museum exhibits, as do the scenic old railway and riverside walks.

During 2008 the village's Langlands Business Park featured in the Channel 4 fly-on-the-wall documentary Wonky Willie's Chocolate Factory, being the location of Willie Harcourt-Cooze's chocolate factory, one of the first places to make chocolate in the UK since the Cadbury family.

The singer Joss Stone lived near Ashill, a hamlet in the parish of Uffculme, and attended Uffculme School. Snooker player Sam Baird comes from the village.
