= Harold Sumption =

Fundraising innovator

- Born: 26 November 1916; Culmstock
- Died: 18 March 1998 (aged 81); London
- Occupations: Advertiser and fundraiser
- Known for: Oxfam, Montreux International Direct Marketing Symposium, International Fundraising Workshop

Harold Sumption (26 November 1916 - 18 March 1998) was an English advertising executive and fundraiser. He was associated with charities including Oxfam, Help the Aged and ActionAid, as well as co-founding the International Fundraising Workshop (IFRW).

A committed Quaker, Sumption served as Oxfam's unpaid advertising adviser from the late 1940s until the late 1980s, and his advice was instrumental in making Oxfam the largest charity in the UK. His work for Oxfam and other charities, as well as his innovations in direct marketing, led to him being described variously as "the father of modern-day fundraising", the "inventor of Marketing 1.0" and the "shy pioneer" who was "the biggest influence on a generation of British fundraisers".

== Personal life and career ==
Born in Culmstock, the son of a Devon farmer, Harold Sumption moved to London in the early 1930s to an apprenticeship at an advertising agency. He became a Quaker after accidentally finding himself at the Yearly Meeting at Friends House, thinking that he was attending a talk by Jomo Kenyatta.

In 1938 he married Ruth Burrows at the Friends meeting house in Wellington, Somerset. In the early 1940s they had two children, Jennifer and Adrian.

During the Second World War, he was a conscientious objector, and suffered a severe return of the tuberculosis that had infected him before the war. In 1946, after 18 months in bed, he undertook his first fundraising assignment: to raise the money to fund his own treatment in a sanatorium in the Swiss Alps. He proposed to the fledgling NHS that they pay towards this treatment whatever it would cost to treat him in London, as this would both free up a bed and in all likelihood lead to an earlier recovery. They accepted this proposal, which covered 33% of the sanatorium costs. The remainder he secured from the Queen Alexandra Sanatorium Fund and the National Advertising Benevolent Society.

It was this fundraising experience, and his Quaker faith, which, following his recovery, led him to place an advertisement in the Quaker journal The Friend seeking a charity to which he could contribute his advertising experience. Cecil Jackson-Cole, of the small young charity then known as the Oxford Committee for Famine Relief, replied. Sumption advised Oxfam for the next 35 years, serving as advertiser, council member, and board member, although he was never on the organisation's payroll.

Alongside his unpaid role as adviser to numerous charities, Sumption had a successful career in advertising. He formed the first British direct marketing division, at NW Ayer and worked at fashionable 1970s start-up MWK. He was a fellow and council-member of the Institute of Practitioners in Advertising, and helped set up the Montreux International Direct Marketing Symposium. He was also one of the first two honorary fellows of the UK's Institute of Charity Fundraising Managers.

== Fundraising influence ==
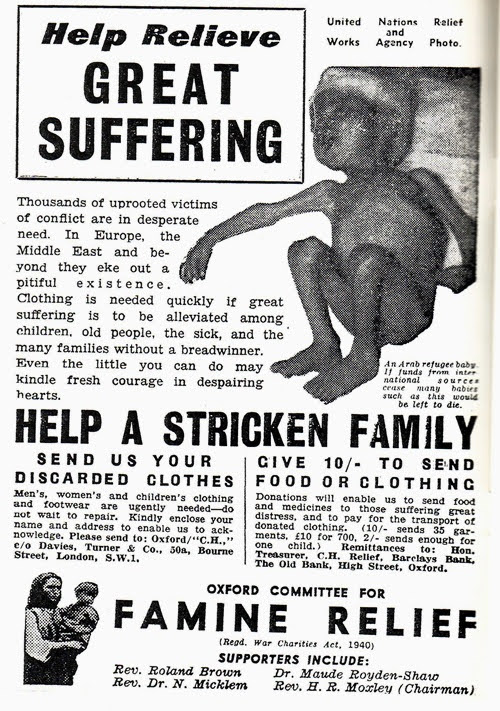
Early advert by Harold Sumption for the Oxford Committee for Famine Relief (now Oxfam)

Sumption's fundraising was informed by the belief that every person has a Good Samaritan within them, but that they need to be shown with clarity, honesty and urgency how and why to exercise that Samaritan instinct.

His first advert for Oxfam, a direct appeal for clothing and blankets to be sent to victims of conflict in Europe and the Middle East, ran in the Sunday Times in 1949. At the time the charity world was sedate, dominated by a few affluent philanthropists, titled people, and the religiously motivated. Press advertising was infrequent, minimal, and inobtrusive, saying merely "this is us, give". His adverts, by contrast, were deliberately artless and crude, emphasising the need that existed, and showing the donor how they could help meet that need. These adverts were shocking, and incredibly effective. They became iconic, carried on banners in Aldermaston marches and appearing in leftist plays.

Sumption pioneered many modern fundraising techniques, including the "off-the page" fundraising advert (one which asks the reader for a direct response); using keyed-response and split runs, to ensure that all creative executions and media placements were driven by results rather than personal opinion; and in 1963, to commemorate Oxfam's 21st birthday, he helped orchestrate the first multimedia charity campaign, Oxfam's "Hunger £ Million", which included a bread-and-water lunch in London's Trafalgar Square, pop stars collecting pound notes on spear-points, and the involvement of the Beatles. He pioneered the computerised mailing list, the charity trading catalogue, charity cinema commercials, home-delivered collection boxes (the "Oxfamily box"), and expanded charities' presence into previously unexplored spaces such as books of stamps, novels, free poster sites, Oxfam-themed radio shows on the pirate radio stations of the day, and a TV appeal featuring hard-hitting interrogation of Oxfam over perceived profligacy, by the TV star Stratford Johns, in character as Inspector Barlow of the series Z-Cars.

In 1979 he co-founded the International Fundraising Workshop (now the Resource Alliance).

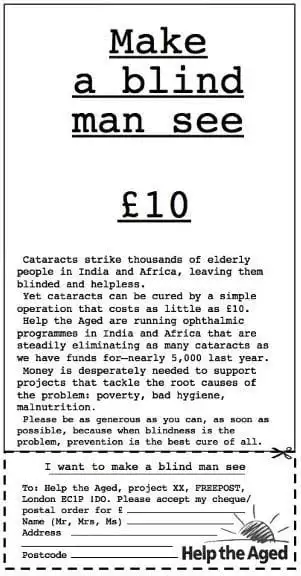
1960s advert for Help the Aged, by Harold Sumption, with the text: "Make a blind man see £10"

He condensed his advice to those who followed him into fundraising into a number of aphorisms:

- Fundraising is not about money. It's about important work that needs doing. If you start by asking for money, you won't get it and you won't deserve it.
- The charity is the agent of the donor.
- Open their hearts, open their minds, then open their wallets.
- Present the need, powerfully, not to shock but to engage.
- Keep the message simple: the need and what the reader can do.
- People give to people, not to organisations, mission statements or strategies.
- Clever copy doesn't work.
- Produce ads that were made to look as if they had been put together by dedicated amateurs on the scullery table.
- Make public relations, press ads and direct mail all sing together.
- Testing, testing, testing.
- Those who give, give. Those that don't, don't.
- The most important two words are "thank you". Acknowledge every donation with a friendly, personal letter. Give larger donors special treatment.
- Share your failures as well as your successes.
- A complainant, well handled, will be your most loyal donor.

== See also ==
- Jeff Goodby
- Jerry Della Femina
- Howard Gossage
