= Culm Valley Light Railway =

Branch railway in Devon, England

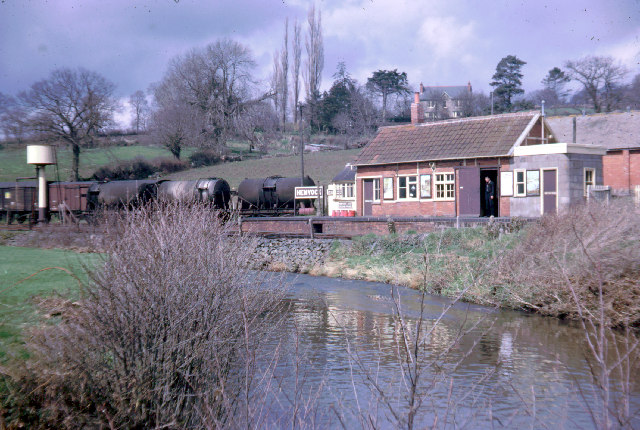
Hemyock railway station

The Culm Valley Light Railway was a standard gauge branch railway that operated in the English county of Devon. It ran for just under 7 1/2 miles (12.1 km) from Tiverton Junction station on the Bristol to Exeter line, through the Culm valley to Hemyock.

It was intended as a very low-cost scheme, but by the time it opened in 1876 had cost more than twice the originally anticipated budget and taken five times the expected time to complete. It was operated from the start by the Great Western Railway, who purchased the line outright in 1880. It was loss-making and underused until United Dairies built a creamery and milk products factory at Hemyock; their output became the dominant traffic.

The line closed to passengers in 1963 but served the milk depot at Hemyock until 1975.

== Starting the company ==
The valley of the River Culm was an attractive, but remote and declining area in the early nineteenth century, containing the villages of Uffculme, Culmstock and Hemyock. The Bristol and Exeter Railway (B&ER) opened its main line in 1844 with a station at Tiverton Road (later Tiverton Junction), and local people observed the improvements in the local economy of places effectively served by the railway, and the decline of places that were by-passed. The small communities in the Culm Valley fell into the latter category.

An engineer, Arthur Cadlick Pain, born 1844, had become interested in the concept of a low-cost railway on his return from working overseas, following the enactment of the Railway Construction Facilities Act 1864, which authorised railway construction without the necessity of an act of Parliament if no affected landowner objected. The Regulation of Railways Act 1868 (31 & 32 Vict. c. 119) authorised the construction of a light railway—the first use of the term—subject to conditions that might be imposed by the Board of Trade.

He discussed the idea of a light railway with Henry S. Ellis, a director of the B&ER; Pain suggested a low-cost line as a steam—or possibly horse operated—tramway running in or alongside the roadway, to serve the Culm Valley settlements. There were to be no stations, but the train would simply stop at road crossings. Such a line might be narrow gauge if the business was expected to be light; and by securing the enthusiasm of local people for the improvement of the district, land acquisition costs might be low. The line would be on the standard gauge. (Note: At this time the main line railway was broad gauge, so a break of gauge and transhipment of goods at the junction were inevitable. Pain had discussed the cheaper construction costs of a narrow gauge line, such as 3 feet or 3ft 6in. It is not recorded why he rejected that and chose standard gauge.)

A public meeting was held at Uffculme on 15 May 1872 and the idea was received with enthusiasm, and on 19 June at another meeting he reported that he had prepared plans and a prospectus. There was some discussion about the location of the Hemyock terminus, in case extension to the London and South Western Railway (LSWR) were later required: Honiton is about ten miles away, but over challenging terrain. There were two objections to the scheme among many positive opinions.

The Railway Construction Facilities Act 1864 authorised construction of a light railway provided that no affected landowner objected to the scheme, but here there were two; the provisional directors decided to apply for an act of Parliament for their line, although that would incur considerable expense, in order to get compulsory acquisition of land. (The objectors soon withdrew their objection, but notice of the fact was received too late to avoid the parliamentary process.) Pain calculated that the line could be built for £3,000 a mile. Enthusiasm was high and a meeting on 18 November 1872 set the process in motion. Pain was soon appointed engineer to the company for a fee of £1,125, to be taken in shares. (Note: The directors claimed that this was the first Light Railway in the country under the 1868 act, but Messenger shows (page 14) that this was not the case.)

=== The act of Parliament ===
Pain was invited to explain his idea at a board meeting of the B&ER later that month. The B&ER were supportive, and agreed to work the line, but they required a number of conditions that had not been expected: there must be proper station accommodation for passengers, with platforms, and for goods, with covered loading accommodation; bridges at the Turnpike road were to be of stone or brick, not timber; and a much improved track specification was required, with 15 inches of ballast.

However, they agreed to work the line for 50% of receipts, and they would contribute £105 towards the expenses of obtaining the act of Parliament. They might agree to buy the line later for a small premium, but the line was not to be extended (presumably towards the LSWR) without their agreement.

Pain managed to persuade the Board of Trade to relax its customary dislike of level crossings, provided the train speed was limited to 16 mph.

Culm Valley Light Railway Act 1873
- Act of Parliament
- Parliament of the United Kingdom
- Long title: An Act for making a railway from the Tiverton Junction Station of the Bristol and Exeter Railway to near Hemyock, all in the County of Devon, to be called the Culm Valley Light Railway; and for other purposes.
- Citation: 36 & 37 Vict. c. xxv

Dates
- Royal assent: 15 May 1873

The bill was presented to Parliament, and it passed, gaining its act of Parliament, the Culm Valley Light Railway Act 1873 (36 & 37 Vict. c. xxv), on 15 May 1873. The Culm Valley Light Railway was now incorporated, with a capital of £25,000.

=== Construction ===
The next stage was to obtain the money for the construction. A share prospectus was issued on 25 September 1873, stating that "The works being so unusually light, the Railway will be opened in about six months after it is commenced". Moreover, "It is nearly sure to prove a safe investment for capital at a rate of interest of between five and six per cent." Pain was quoted as saying:

I might safely say that if people living in the locality do not look sharp, they will get no shares at all. The capital is small and there are many gentlemen of influence around willing to take shares ... I know of no line which has been received with so much public approval.

In the event about a third of the subscribed capital was local. The B&ER subscribed £4,000.

Invitations to tender for the construction were soon issued, in ten separate sections, the intention being to enable small local contractors to participate; in the event that expectation was little justified. Contracts were not to be let until all the capital had been subscribed, but that too was soon abandoned. D. A. Jardine of Hawarden in North Wales was awarded most of the heavy contracts for the earthworks and track laying. The total of awarded tenders came to £18,497 10s 7d.

The B&ER, evidently believing the claim about a six months' construction period, quickly set about constructing locomotives and rolling stock to operate the line.

By September 1874, Pain was obliged to report that progress on construction had been consistently slow, and Jardine was warned that if this was not quickly accelerated, his contract would be terminated. He failed to act as required, and the work was transferred to Richard Broome. He needed the services of a locomotive to assist with the construction work, and one was hired in from Henry Hind & Son of Nottingham, but this proved catastrophically unreliable.

Broome was informed on 24 April 1875 that the company was running out of money; unpaid calls amounted to £1,212—about 5%. The company, and not Broome, had been paying the locomotive hire charges and it is likely that they had taken responsibility for a number of other costs not properly specified in Pain's contract arrangements. The financial crisis could be averted, they felt, if the line could soon be opened, on 17 July. Inspections showed that the line was far from ready, and a desperate plea was made to the B&ER to purchase the uncompleted line from the Company at once; the B&ER declined.

Colonel Yolland of the Board of Trade was asked to make a formal inspection of the line with a view to opening, and he visited on 14 July. He found many areas of dissatisfaction and refused authority to open.

More delay was incurred, and Pain was given an ultimatum to complete by the year end; this passed and the company was borrowing increasing sums of money, now beyond the authorised limit. Yolland was asked to inspect the line again on 12 February 1876; he found a number of issues still outstanding and again refused opening. However, on 20 May Yolland made another inspection, and this time he found the line ready, subject to operation on the "one engine in steam" principle, and a speed limit of 15 mph.

The B&ER had amalgamated with the Great Western Railway (GWR) on 1 January, and as a new partner, the GWR was less tolerant of the little Company's shortcomings. Accordingly, in the discussion that now took place about working the line, the company discovered that the GWR expected that station buildings to be furnished; in addition there was a long list of items that needed to be completed before the line was usable. There was a considerable gap between the GWR's expectations and what Pain thought was reasonable, but on 27 May 1876 a special train passed up the line, depositing at the general stations stationmasters, clerks, porters and the necessary appliances for business.

=== Opening ===
On Monday 29 May 1876 the line opened. Instead of taking six months to build, the construction had taken two and a half years, and the expenditure had exceeded £46,000 compared with the estimated cost of £22,500. Expenditure on infrastructure had been £42,903, and the cost overrun was attributed by the board to the increased cost of rails, the failure of the contractor to complete the works, necessitating the company to execute some of the works directly, and the increased cost of purchasing land.

A formal opening was organised for Thursday 1 June 1876, with a grand lunch, rural sports and pastimes, and a ball.

=== The line in operation ===
There were five mixed (passenger and goods) trains each way daily, operated by the GWR. Two locomotives worked on the line, nos. 114 and 115 built by the B&ER specially for the line; they were 0-6-0T weighing 20 tons 8cwt, with 3 ft 6in wheels and a water tube boiler. In view of the apparent urgency for providing them at the time of obtaining the authorising act of Parliament, other locomotive construction had been delayed, a fact that remained a point of contention with the GWR. Pain now complained to the GWR that the locomotives were excessively heavy; he was probably prompted to do so by damage to the track, which was exceptionally light in construction. As the locomotives were now two years old, the GWR were not sympathetic to the complaint; however the trailing wheels of the locomotives were decoupled, making them 0-4-2T.

The Taunton to Exeter line had been converted to mixed gauge earlier in 1876, so that there was no break of gauge at the junction station.

=== Money problems ===
The financial performance of the line was extremely disappointing, with an income of about £4 a week. The directors had borrowed additional money on overdraft against their personal guarantees, and there was no income to pay the interest on that debt. A number of measures were considered, including issuing additional share capital, and it was no surprise when almost no interest was shown in buying into a loss-making business.

The GWR were still dissatisfied with the facilities provided at the stations, and with the standard of the track, and this issue continued as a point of conflict. The company had wished the GWR to take over the line, but the GWR were not prepared to consider that. In the face of shortage of money Pain gave notice in June 1877 to the GWR that he would discontinue maintenance of the line, leaving the GWR to take care of the matters. It appears that he did not actually do this.

The following months were a continuous series of difficulties over money; even quite small financial obligations posed insuperable challenges. A number of quite fantastical proposals were dreamed up, including sale to the LSWR, and using the line as the springboard for a new independent GWR route to London. The directors' personal guarantees of the overdraft emphasised the crisis. This dragged on through 1879 and it was obvious that the only way out was for the GWR to be persuaded to buy the line—at any price. The appropriate price was low and it took some time for the shareholders to come to terms with the loss of value of their investment, but agreement was formalised on 5 August 1880, from which date the line was owned by the Great Western Railway. The final meeting of the company, no longer the owner of a railway, took place on 3 November 1882. (Note: Messenger (page 33) says 3 November 1881 but Maggs (page 36) says 1882, and refers to reports of events during 1882 presented at the meeting.) The shareholders had received 5½% of their investment back.

== In Great Western ownership ==
Accordingly, without much enthusiasm the Great Western Railway now owned the little railway. Pain's dream of a very low-cost branch line with minimal station facilities and light track and rolling stock had been frustrated by the Board of Trade (personified by Yolland) and the GWR's attitude, which was that the line was defective in falling short of proper GWR standards for a branch line. They soon replaced the original locomotives with two 2-4-0T locomotives that had been built as broad gauge machines for the South Devon Railway, but not actually put into service. Completed at Swindon as standard gauge engines, they were numbered 1298 and 1300.

Refrigeration became a practical process in the 1870s and it had the result of enabling cheap imported butter, undercutting what could be produced in home dairies. This had the effect of spurring mechanical production methods and the Culm Valley Dairy Company was established at Hemyock in 1884. The quality of the product was much in demand and the Company despatched butter throughout England. Skimmed milk was a by-product of the process, and it was useful in pig husbandry, so that piggeries were established in the area also. Suddenly there was a focus of industry and agriculture on the line, and in 1890 the factory moved to larger premises next to Hemyock station. Quarry stone was also sent from Hemyock in later years.

In 1915 the United Dairies Company was formed, and it set about acquiring local dairy businesses. It took over the Hemyock plant the following year, and started sending liquid milk to London in ever increasing volumes; in addition condensed milk and dried milk were transported away, and coal was an inwards traffic.

Passenger traffic, never very heavy, remained broadly constant. The 1920 timetable shows four journeys each way, most of the trains being mixed. The first train from Tiverton Junction to Hemyock, at 9.0 a.m., was allowed 65 minutes for the journey of 7½ miles, time being included for shunting sidings on the way.

In the 1920s the GWR began to examine the cost base of rural branch lines; in 1925 receipts on the line were £22,609 against costs of £7,587. A GWR report recommended closure of the passenger service and limiting the branch activity to handling goods during a single working shift, and heavily reducing facilities on the line. The report was not acted on, and conversely a new halt, Coldharbour, was opened in January 1929. Later in 1929 it was agreed to spend money improving facilities on the branch, and in particular making it fit for standard rolling stock. The original loading gauge had been somewhat limited. However "main line" coaching stock was never used, and the imperative for this may have been the foreseen introduction of six-wheel milk tank wagons, then being trialled elsewhere on the GWR. These were introduced on the branch in 1932. The tanks were glass-lined and cork-insulated; the dairy company owned the tank while the GWR owned the underframe and running gear.

Contemplating electrification of the main line, a 1929 report considered electrifying the branch too, or using "petrol cars" on it, but electrification never became a serious possibility. A number of alternative locomotives were used on the line in this period, most of them having come to the GWR from other independent lightly engineered lines. In 1932 the 4800 class of 0-4-2T locomotives started to be delivered, and variants of the class and the similar 5800 type dominated the subsequent history of the line.

Whitehall Halt was opened on 27 February 1933.

== From 1948 ==
After nationalisation in 1948, the railway continued pretty much unchanged in the custody of British Railways. However, in 1950 the two ancient passenger coaches were replaced by two bogie coaches from the former Barry Railway. The slow speed on the line was inadequate to re-charge the lighting batteries on the coaches, so they were converted from electric to gas lighting, and were the last gas-lit coaching vehicles on British Railways. The coaches acted as guards' brake vehicles and Messenger suggests that the passenger service would have been terminated if they had not been used; five passengers a day were recorded as using Hemyock station a few years later.

Passenger usage continued to decline and early in 1962 notice of intention to discontinue the passenger service was given. In the last months the Barry Railway passenger coaches themselves had to be replaced, and two ex London and North Eastern Railway vehicles were found; Messenger says that they were run to Exeter once a week to charge their batteries. The last passenger train ran on 7 September 1963. No replacement bus service was considered necessary.

== Freight only ==
The following Monday a 204 hp diesel locomotive operated the remaining goods traffic on the line, and was the general motive power subsequently. General freight continued for a while, but that too was discontinued on 6 September 1965. However, the line continued to serve the dairy at Hemyock until 31 October 1975. Class 25 diesel locomotives were used in the final months. From the following day the line was closed.

== The line today ==
Today the line forms some popular riverside walks at various points along the valley. The station sites have been redeveloped.

== Model railway ==
A model railway of the line at Tiverton Junction with branch to Hemyock is displayed by Culm Valley Model Railway Club at the Old Well Garden Centre and is open to the public on the 2nd and 4th Sundays of the month.

== Topography ==
The line was 7 miles 27 chains (11.8 km) in length; single track throughout, it fell consistently from Hemyock to Tiverton Junction, with two short rising lengths; the steepest gradient was 1 in 66. Stations on the line were:

- Hemyock
- Whitehall Siding; and halt opened 27 February 1933
- Culmstock
- Uffculme
- Cold Harbour Siding; and Coldharbour Halt (also spelt Cold Harbour Halt) opened 23 February 1929
- Tiverton Junction, on the main line.

The line approached Tiverton Junction station in a southward direction.

== Original track ==
Colonel Yolland described the track as originally provided:

The width of the line at formation level is 11 feet on the embankments and 12 feet in cuttings. The gauges were 4 feet 8½ inches. The permanent way consists of flat-bottomed or Vignoles patterned rail stated to weigh 40 lbs per lineal yard in lengths of 15 feet, 17 feet 6 inches, and 21 feet, laid on transverse sleepers of half-round Baltic timber creosoted (4½ in.), and 9 feet long placed at an average distance of three feet apart, centre to centre, except that on some of the sharpest curves an extra sleeper has been inserted under every 21 feet length of rail. No chairs are made use of, but the rail is fastened to the transverse sleepers by a fang-bolt with a clip under the head, overlapping the flange of the rail on one side, and by a wrought iron spike on the other side. On the sharpest curves a wrought iron plate is laid between the rail and the sleeper, with holes punched in it, through which the fang-bolt and spike are driven; the joints of the rails are fastened with wrought iron fish-plates and bolts, and secured to the sleepers with a fang-bolt and clip on each side of the rail. The ballast is of gravel, a small proportion of sand; it was required according to the contract, to be eight inches deep under the sleepers, but is stated to average about one foot. No engine turn table has been provided. The line has a very large number of sharp curves having radii of 6, 7, 8, 9 and 10 chains. The steepest incline is 1 in 66.

== Literary association ==
R D Blackmore wrote a three-volume novel called Perlycross: a Tale of the Western Hills which is set in the fictional villages of Perlycombe, Perlycross and Perliton, which represent Hemyock, Culmstock and Uffculme respectively.
