= Culmstock =

Village and civil parish in Devon, England

Coordinates: 50.929°N 3.285°W

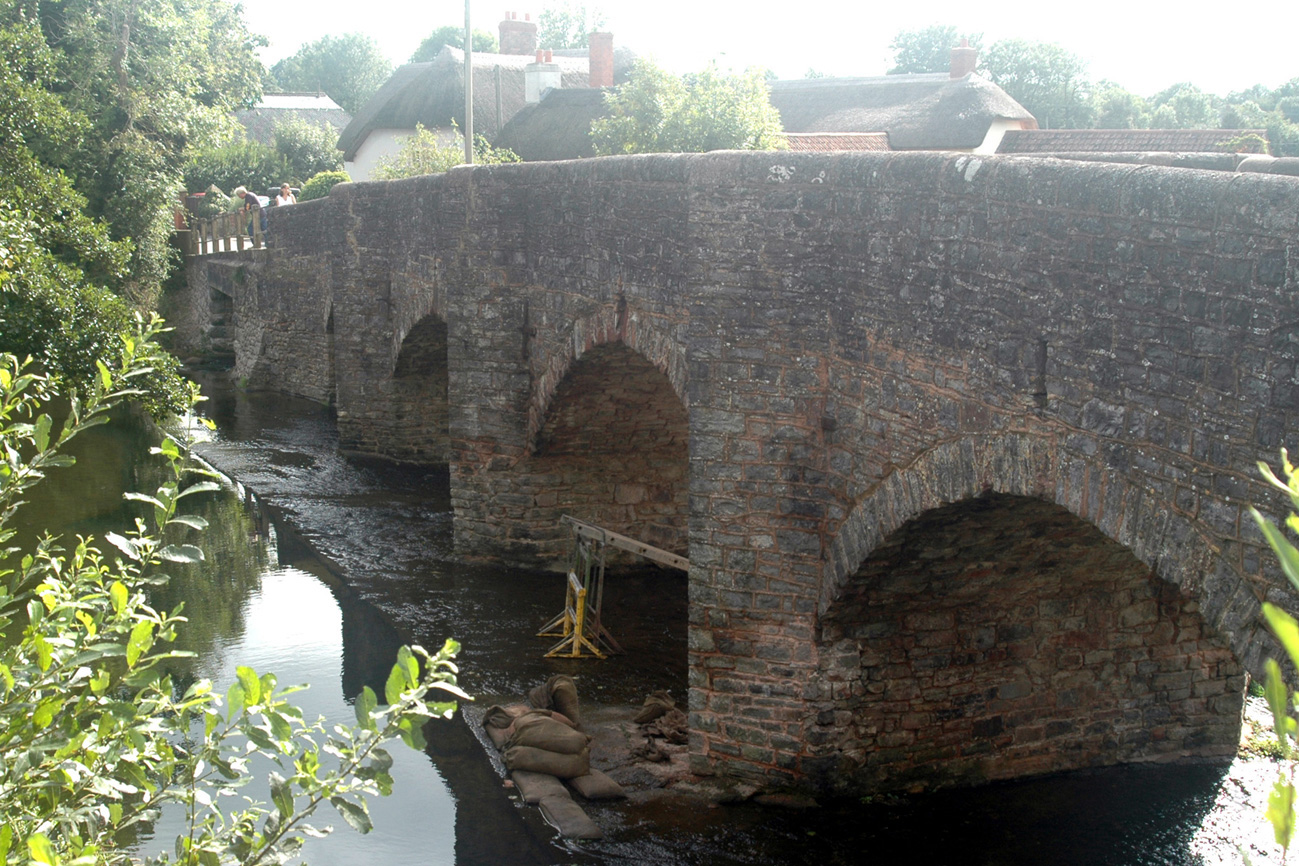
Old stone bridge with pedestrian refuges over River Culm at Culmstock

Culmstock is a village and civil parish in Mid Devon, England, centred 10 miles from Tiverton and 6 NE of Cullompton. It is laid out on both sides of the River Culm; the village is joined by a single old narrow stone bridge across the river. The population of the parish at the 2011 Census was 554. The northern boundary of the parish forms part of the Devon – Somerset border and clockwise from there it is surrounded by the Devon parishes of Hemyock, Uffculme, Burlescombe and Holcombe Rogus.

Historically, in minor matters of law and taxation, Culmstock contributed to Hemyock Hundred. It saw prosperity as a centre of weaving and the wool trade, but this prosperity, and the relative population to that nationally, declined considerably in the latter part of the Industrial Revolution. The population was around 1446 for the forty years before the 1841 census but fell in the next 40 years to 863. In 1961 after a non-linear descent, the population was 692, broadly similar to today's total.

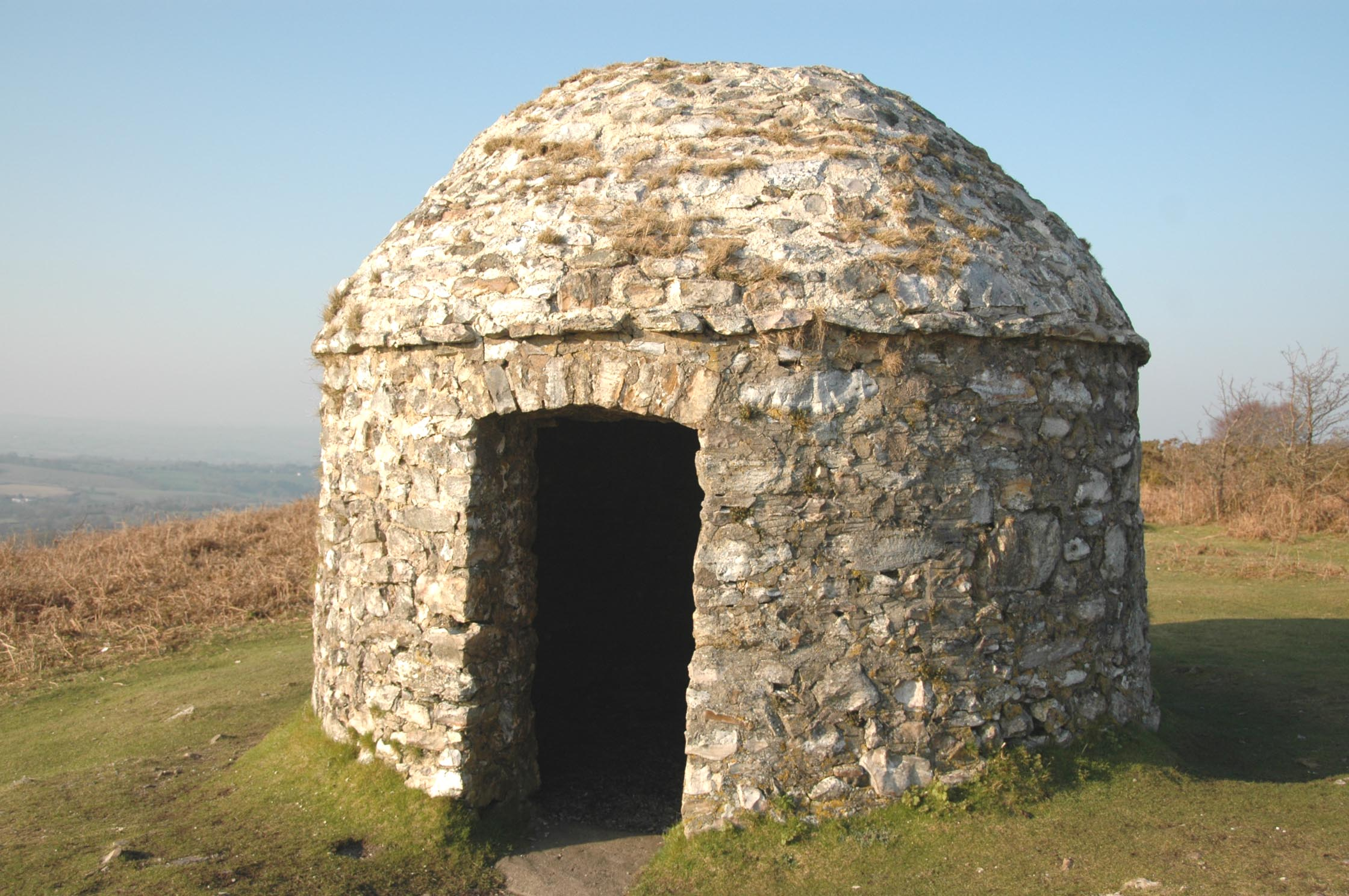
1588 signal station above village at Culmstock Beacon, built to warn of the Spanish Armada.

== All Saint's Church ==
All Saint's Church, in Fore street, is known for the plucky Yew tree that grows out of the tower! The church is in the centre of the village and dates generally from the 15th century. An important Grade II* listed building. On 22 July 2026, the 200 year old Yew was shortlisted in the Woodland Trust's annual Tree of the Year award.

== Notable people connected with village ==
R.D. Blackmore, the author of Lorna Doone, lived in Culmstock for six years while his father, John Blackmore, was curate-in-charge of the parish, and he based his novel Perlycross on the Culm Valley.

Octavius Temple, father of Frederick Temple and grandfather of William Temple (both Archbishops of Canterbury), purchased Axon Farm, near the settlement. Octavius went to be Governor of Sierra Leone, where he died in 1834. The family had, however, remained at Culmstock. Blundell's School at Tiverton hosted the boarding years of the latter childhood of Frederick.

Harold Sumption (1916-1998), an English advertising executive and fundraiser, was born in Culmstock.

== Transport ==
The village was served by a station on the Culm Valley Light Railway, which connected to one of two main lines leaving the south-west peninsula, at Tiverton Junction. The Light Railway ran from 1876 to 1975, though the last passengers were carried in 1963.
