= Hemyock =

Village in Devon, England

- Village
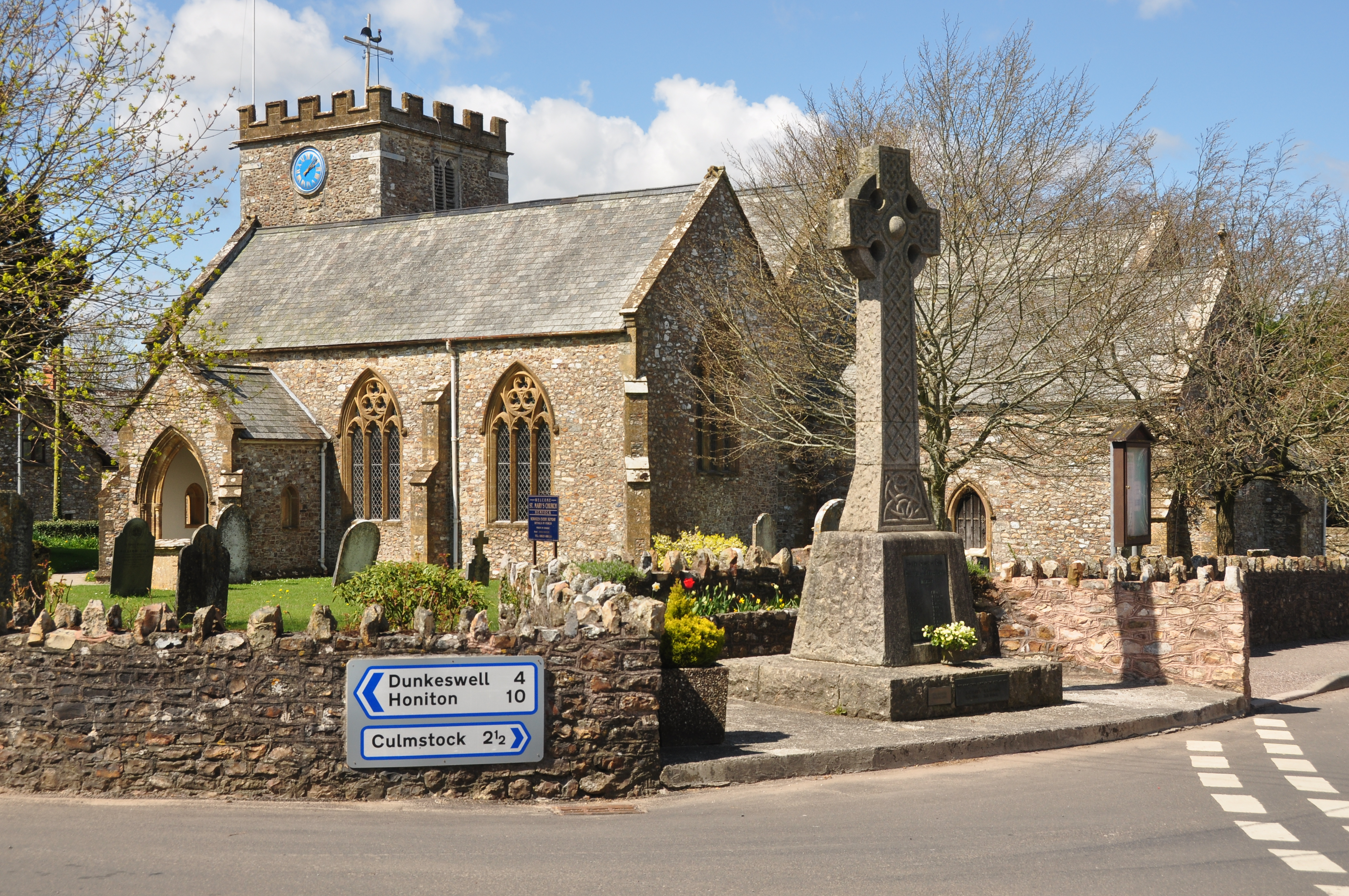
- St Mary's parish church, with the parish war memorial in the foreground

- Location within Devon Location within the United Kingdom
- Coordinates: 50°55′N 3°14′W
- Country: England
- County: Devon

Population (2011)
  - Total: 1,519
- Time zone: UTC+0:00 (GST)
- Website: hemyock.org

Hemyock (/ˈhɛmiɒk/) is a village and civil parish in Devon, England. It is about 8 miles north-west of Honiton and 5 miles (8 km) south of the Somerset town Wellington. The 2011 Census recorded the parish's population as 1,519. Hemyock is part of the electoral ward of Upper Culm. The population of this ward at the above census was 4,039. The River Culm flows through Hemyock. Hemyock is the former home of the St Ivel dairy processing plant, where the butter-spreads St Ivel Gold and Utterly Butterly were produced before being moved to a factory in the north of England.

Hemyock was also the birthplace of the National Federation of Young Farmers' Clubs. The first Young Culm Farmers' Club in England began here in 1921, and it continues to prosper as the Culm Valley Young Farmers' Club.

Hemyock is the largest village on the Blackdown Hills, which is designated as an Area of Outstanding Natural Beauty (AONB). The parish has an area of about 2350 hectares, and lies on the NW of the Blackdown Hills. Its northern boundary forms part of the Devon – Somerset border, and clockwise from there, it is surrounded by the Devon parishes Clayhidon, Dunkeswell, Uffculme and Culmstock.

== Population ==
Hemyock is a typical upland settlement consisting of a central "town" surrounded by a number of hamlets (Culm Davey, Millhayes, Simonsburrow, Ashculme, Tedburrow, Madford, Mountshayne etc.). From the 16th century to the early 19th century much of the parish's wealth came from the production of wool. The population remained fairly constant throughout the 19th century, and until the end of the Second World War. Since then a number of housing estates have been built, and the population has increased to 4,039 as at the 2021 census.

== History ==
The village has a very long history and some prehistoric remains may be found, from about 100 BC to well beyond. In the Middle Ages local iron ores were smelted in small bloomeries (furnaces) to produce pure iron. In Saxon times a battle was fought at Simonsburrow between the Blackdown Templars, led by Godwin the Narrowminded against the heathen tribes of Culmstock.

The name Hemyock could have originated from the British stream name "Samiaco" (meaning summer), other authorities suggest a Saxon origin from a personal name "Hemman" coupled with a Saxon word for a bend or a hook (occi).

== Hemyock Hundred ==
Hemyock was head of the Hemyock Hundred, an administrative sub-division of the Shire county of Devonshire, under the system of government used during the Saxon period. The Domesday Book records that the Hemyock Hundred consisted of the manors of: Awliscombe, Bolham Water, Bywood, Churchstanton (Somerset), Clayhidon, Culm Davy, Culm Pyne, Culmstock, Dunkeswell, Gorewell, Hemyock, Hole, Ivedon, Mackham, Weston.

== Hemyock Castle ==
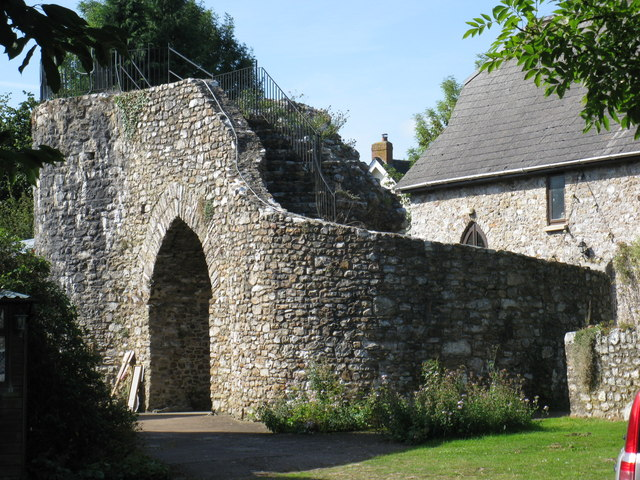
Remains of Hemyock Castle

On 5 November 1380, King Richard II granted Sir William and Lady Margaret Asthorpe a licence to crenellate the Hemyock manor house; meaning the permission to fortify it. Hemyock Castle has many similarities with the much better known Bodiam Castle, granted the licence to crenellate in 1385. Over the centuries, Hemyock Castle had many notable owners including Lord Chief Justice Sir John Popham and General Sir John Graves Simcoe the first lieutenant-governor of Upper Canada in 1792. He is buried at Wolford Chapel near Dunkeswell. The chapel is now owned by the Province of Ontario.

During the English Civil War it was held for Parliament, subjected to a brief but brutal siege and eventually slighted to destroy its military value. Parts of the castle walls, towers and moat still remain. They are a scheduled monument. The castle site is privately owned: Visits can be arranged for groups; there are also public open days.

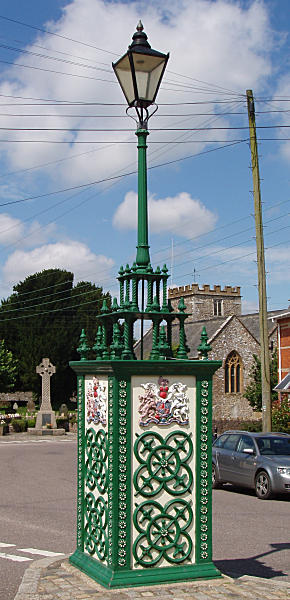
Ornate water pump in the centre of Hemyock

== Churches ==
St Mary's parish church is next to Hemyock Castle, on the other side of St Margaret's Brook. The Baptist Church is at the top of Station Road.

== Facilities ==
Hemyock remains a viable village, with a school, medical facilities, one garage, one accident repair centre, two hairdressers, one public house, one convenience store, one Post Office & store, two playing fields, a Parish Hall, a community centre and two churches.

== Transport ==
The village is served by the Stagecoach 20 and the Redwoods 697 buses.

Hemyock was the terminus of the Culm Valley Light Railway that ran between the village and Tiverton Junction for 99 years between 1876 and 1975, with passenger services closing in 1963.

== Industry ==
The first mechanically operated butter factory in the West of England was started at Mountshayne in 1886 by 4 local farmers, this was later transferred to Millhayes, subsequently becoming part of St. Ivel. It was closed in the 1990s. The site has been re-developed for housing.

== Notable people ==
- The Cadbury family, founders of the Cadbury chocolate company, is said to have originated here

== Climate ==
Climate data for Hemyock
Month	Jan	Feb	Mar	Apr	May	Jun	Jul	Aug	Sep	Oct	Nov	Dec	Year
Record high °C (°F)	13.6 (56.5)	17.2 (63.0)	20.0 (68.0)	24.0 (75.2)	27.0 (80.6)	28.3 (82.9)	32.1 (89.8)	32.3 (90.1)	27.1 (80.8)	26.3 (79.3)	17.4 (63.3)	14.6 (58.3)	32.3 (90.1)
Mean daily maximum °C (°F)	7.7 (45.9)	8.0 (46.4)	10.2 (50.4)	12.8 (55.0)	15.9 (60.6)	18.9 (66.0)	20.8 (69.4)	20.5 (68.9)	18.0 (64.4)	14.0 (57.2)	10.7 (51.3)	8.2 (46.8)	13.8 (56.9)
Mean daily minimum °C (°F)	2.4 (36.3)	2.2 (36.0)	3.1 (37.6)	4.6 (40.3)	7.0 (44.6)	9.7 (49.5)	11.6 (52.9)	11.8 (53.2)	9.8 (49.6)	7.6 (45.7)	5.0 (41.0)	2.9 (37.2)	6.5 (43.7)
Record low °C (°F)	−11.1 (12.0)	−9.5 (14.9)	−7.5 (18.5)	−3.8 (25.2)	−1.1 (30.0)	0.9 (33.6)	3.7 (38.7)	3.5 (38.3)	1.9 (35.4)	−3.6 (25.5)	−5.5 (22.1)	−10.1 (13.8)	−11.1 (12.0)
Average precipitation mm (inches)	115.3 (4.54)	86.4 (3.40)	84.0 (3.31)	67.5 (2.66)	68.8 (2.71)	69.4 (2.73)	63.0 (2.48)	75.9 (2.99)	77.4 (3.05)	118.8 (4.68)	117.5 (4.63)	130.6 (5.14)	1,074.6 (42.32)
Mean monthly sunshine hours	47.3	72.1	111.5	168.1	196.0	192.9	196.2	180.7	142.5	95.9	62.8	41.8	1,507.8
Source 1: Starlings Roost Weather (temperatures 1991-2020, precipitation and sunshine 1978-2021)
Source 2: Starlings Roost Weather (extremes 1978-2021)
