= Du Val =

Du Val is a surname. Notable people with the surname include:

- Patrick du Val (1903–1987), British mathematician
- Peter Du Val (1767–1851), the son of Jean Du Val and Marie Piton
- Pierre Nicolas Camille Jacquelin du Val (1828–1862), French entomologist

== See also ==
- Duvale
