= Goggin =

A coat of arms associated with the surname Goggin

Goggin is a surname.

== Origin ==
The surname Goggin has several origins. In some cases it is a variant of the surname Coogan, and derived from the Irish Mac Cogadháin, meaning "son of Cogadhán". The Irish Cogadhán is diminutive form of Cúchogaidh, derived from elements meaning "hound of war".

In other cases, the surname Goggin is derived from the place name Cogan, which is in the diocese of Llandaff, in Glamorganshire, Wales. The earliest reference is to Emma de Cogan (possibly mother of Milo, Richard and Geoffrey), c.1138.

The first of the family to arrive in Ireland was the famous Milo de Cogan who came to Ireland as Strongbow's right-hand man in the Anglo-Norman Invasion of 1169. The first arms for de Cogan were "Gules, 3 lozenges, argent" and their geometric design and colours indicate close relationships with the FitzGeralds and de Barrys. Near to Cogan village the de Sumeris (from Sommery near Dieppe) held land. Their proximity to the Norman court at Rouen and the de Cogans being part of the household of the Earl of Gloucester may hint to the same genesis.

== Heraldry ==
The coat of arms of the de Cogan family and its modern descendant Goggin, dates back to Miles de Cogan, one of the knights of Richard de Clare, 2nd Earl of Pembroke Strongbow, around 1154AD. The Goggin and Cogan blazon of arms is: "Gules, three leaves argent". The variety of leaf is variously given as "oak", by Fox-Davies; (1902) "laurel" by Thomas Robson (The British Herald); "fig" by Rokewode, John Gage, History and Antiquities of Suffolk: Thingoe Hundred, 1838, pp. 218–9); "Aspen" by the Middlesex Heraldry Society The Goggin family crest is derived from that of Cogan". The motto associated with the Goggin and Cogan family heraldry is 'Non metuo' which translates to 'I do not fear'. For the Welsh origin for the Goggin family name, the motto is 'Constans fidei', which translates to 'Constant to Honour'.

== People ==
- John de Cogan, Anglo-Irish knight
- Bill Goggin, former Australian rules football player
- Brian Goggin (artist), American sculptor and installation artist
- Brian Goggin (banker), former chief executive officer of the Bank of Ireland
- Bryce Goggin, American record producer and sound engineer
- Chuck Goggin, American former baseball player
- Dan Goggin (composer), American writer, composer, and lyricist
- Dan Goggin (rugby union), Irish rugby union player
- David Goggins, American runner, podcaster, author
- Gerard Goggin, Australian media and communications scholar
- James M. Goggin, Confederate States Army officer
- John Mann Goggin, American cultural anthropologist
- Mathew Goggin, Australian golfer
- Matt Goggin, Australian rules footballer
- Mike Goggin, American politician
- Pat Goggin, Irish footballer
- Peter Goggin, Australian cricketer
- Terry Goggin, American author, businessman, educator, and politician
- Walton Goggins, American actor
- William C. Goggin, American chemist, business manager and business theorist
- William L. Goggin, American politician and lawyer
- Willie Goggin, American golfer

== See also ==
- Goggins (disambiguation)
