= Feudal barony of Bampton =

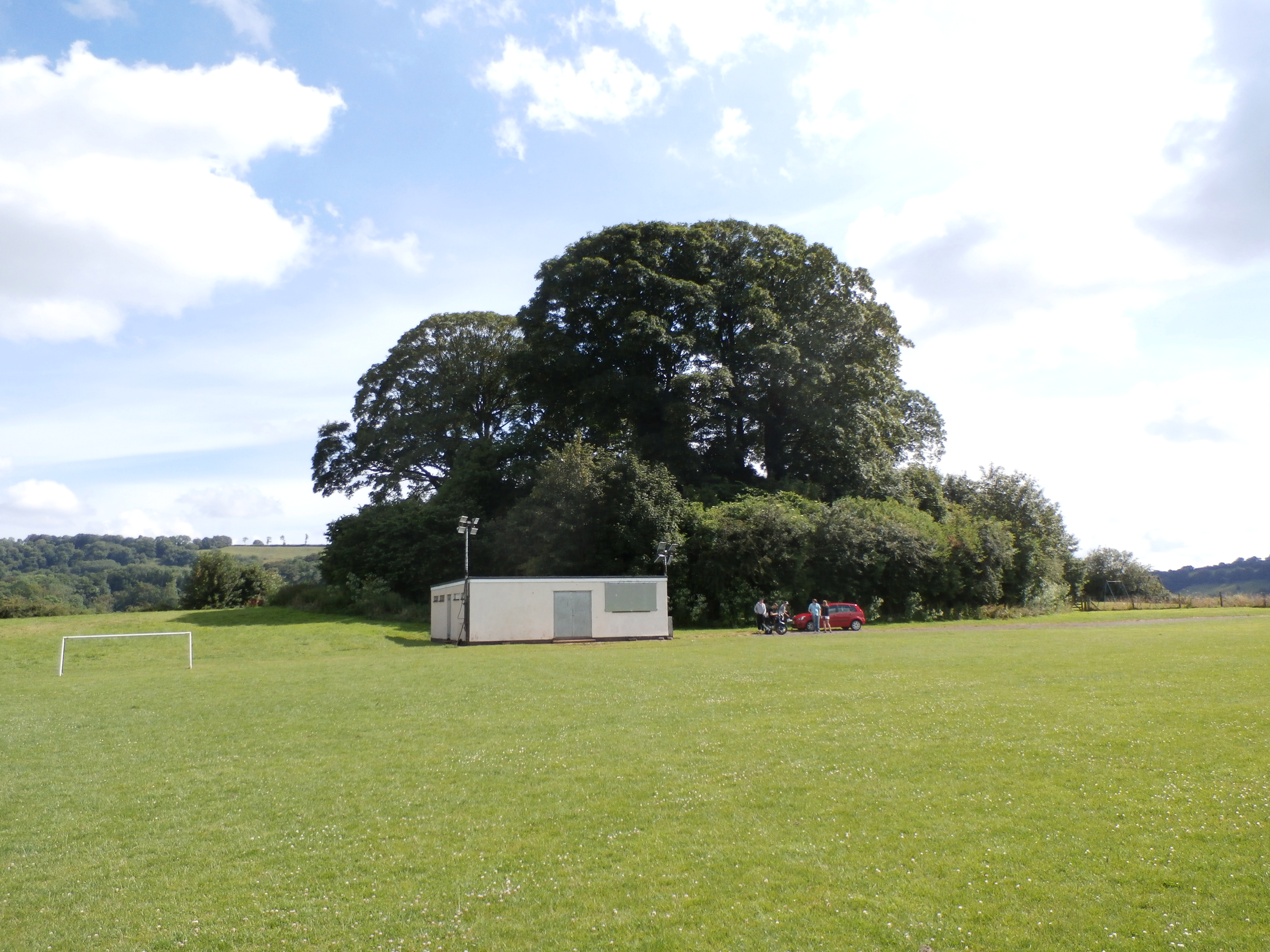
Remnant of the motte of Bampton Castle, ancient seat of the feudal barons of Bampton; looking eastwards, with town of Bampton beyond to right

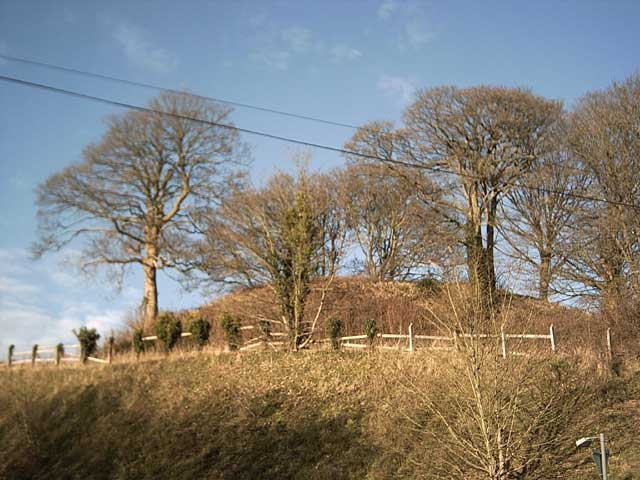
Bampton Castle motte viewed in winter

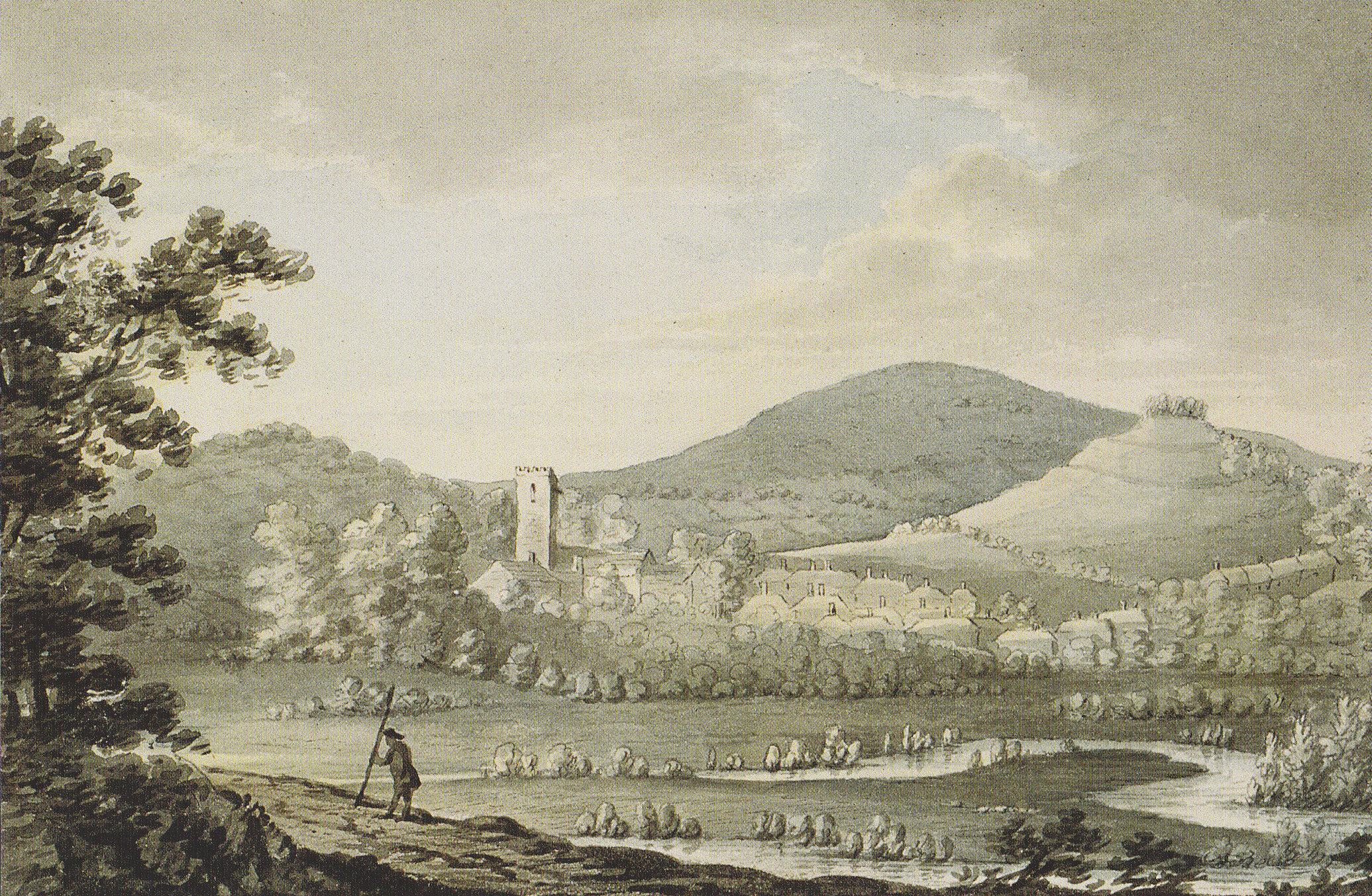
View of Bampton, with castle mound to right, painted in 1800 by Rev. John Swete (died 1821)

The feudal barony of Bampton was one of eight feudal baronies in Devonshire which existed during the mediaeval era, and had its caput at Bampton Castle within the manor of Bampton.

== Descent ==
=== Domesday Book ===
The Domesday Book of 1086 lists Baentone as one of the 27 Devon holdings of Walter of Douai, also known therein as Walscin. Walter was also feudal baron of Castle Cary in Somerset. At Bampton he established a castle, the motte of which survives today. The manor was a very large holding of 76 households, and previously to the Norman Conquest of England of 1066 had been held in demesne by King Edward the Confessor. As a manor in the royal demesne it had paid no tax. (Note: Domesday Book: "This land has never paid tax". Risdon stated: "This place was never gelded, for it was the king's demesne at the Conquest") Walter had obtained it from William the Conqueror in exchange for the manors previously granted to him of Ermington and Blackawton. According to the Book of Fees the member manors of the barony of Bampton included: Duvale, Hele (possibly Hele, Clayhanger), Doddiscombe, Hockworthy, Havekareland (possibly Hawkerland, Colaton Raleigh), and Legh (Lea Barton, Hockworthy). Walter held the manor of Bampton in demesne, but nevertheless he had three tenants who held land somewhere within the manor, namely two men named Rademar, one of whom appears to have been a tenant of several of Walter's Somerset manors. One may possibly have been Rademar the Clerk, Walter's brother. The third tenant was Gerard, thought to have been Walter's steward and his tenant at Bratton Seymour in Somerset. The descent from Walter of Douai was as follows:

- Robert of Douai (son), who in 1136 rebelled against King Stephen, when his lands passed to his daughter and heiress Juliana.
- Juliana of Douai, who married as her first husband Fulk Paynel (died c. 1165)

=== Paynel ===
The Duchess of Cleveland in her Battle Abbey Roll stated of the Paynel (alias Painell, Paganel, Pagnell, etc.) family: "The various accounts of it, either by Dugdale, or the county historians of places where they held lands, are so contradictory to each other, that to endeavour to reconcile them to any degree of correctness would require more consumption of time and expense in the investigation of public records, than would compensate any author for the undertaking."—Banks. I, for one, should be far from coveting such a task, even if I possessed the ability that it would require". The descent of Paynel, feudal barons of Bampton is as follows, according to Sanders (1960):

- Fulk Paynel (died c. 1165), husband of Juliana of Douai
- Fulk Paynel (died 1208), who in 1180 offered 1,000 marks in payment of feudal relief on his inheritance, but fled England in 1185, when the barony escheated to the crown until restored to Fulk in 1199, on payment of 1,000 marks.
- William Paynel (died 1228), son and heir, paid 200 marks feudal relief for his inheritance. He married Alice Brewer, 4th daughter and co-heiress of William Brewer (died 1226), Sheriff of Devon, and widow of Reginald de Mohun (died 1213) feudal baron of Dunster, Somerset.
- William Paynel (died 1248), who left as his heir his sister Auda Paynell (died 1261), wife of John de Ballon (died 1275), feudal baron of Much Marcle in Herefordshire.

=== Ballon ===
The first members of this family to have come to England were Wynebald de Ballon (c. 1058 – c. 1126), and his brother Hamelin de Ballon (c. 1060 – c. 1090 or 1105/6), sons of Drogo (or Dru) de Ballon, lord of the castle of Ballon, 12 miles north of Le Mans, capital of the ancient province of Maine. From its strength the castle was known as "The Gateway to Maine". Ballon is today a French commune, in the department of Sarthe (72), in the modern region of Pays de la Loire. Maine was invaded and conquered by William Duke of Normandy in the early 1060s, just prior to his invasion of England.

- John de Ballon (died 1275), feudal baron of Much Marcle in Herefordshire. He was charged £100 in feudal relief for the lands of his brother-in-law William Paynel. He died without children from Auda Paynel from whose death in 1261 until 1267 the barony passed to the wardship of Edmund of Lancaster (1245–1296), the second surviving son of King Henry III .

=== Cogan ===
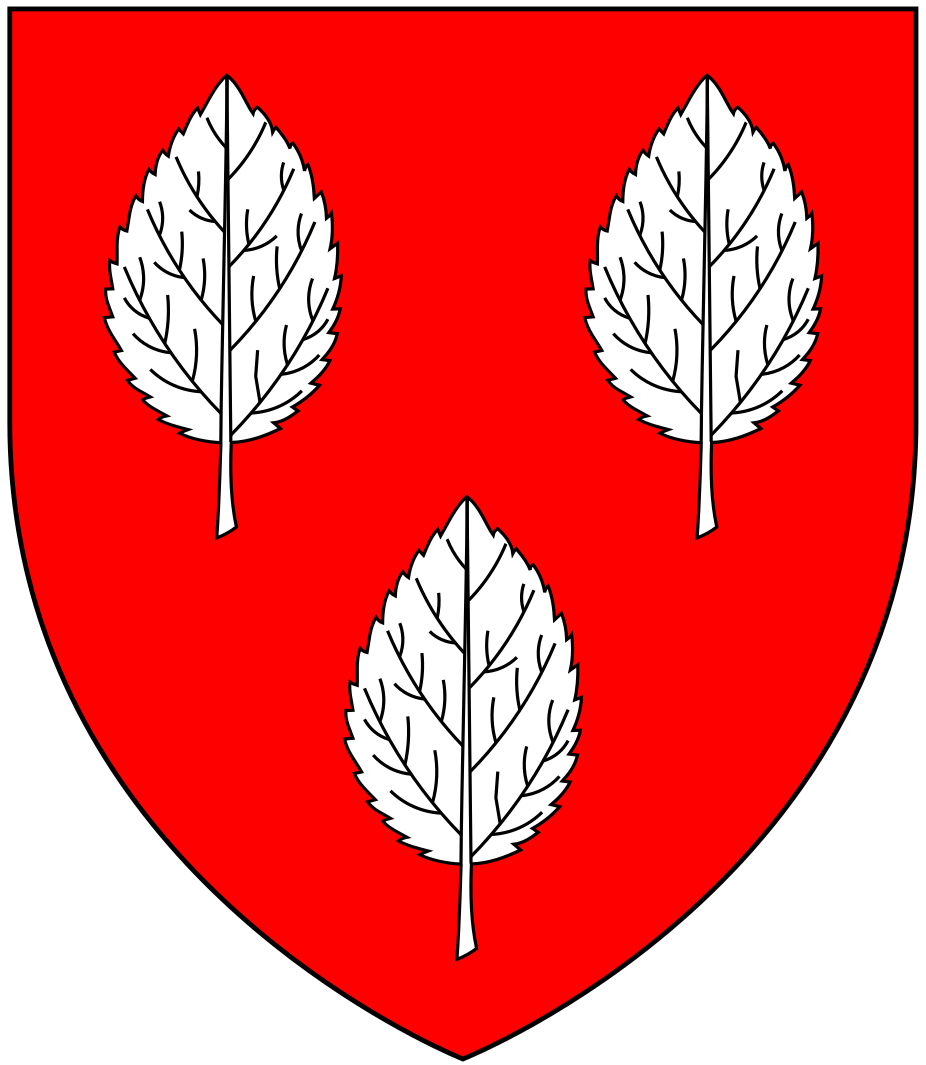
Arms of Cogan: Gules, three (mulbery) leaves argent. (Note: As blazoned by Sir William Pole (died 1635) and as depicted quartered on monument of Lady Frances Bourchier (1587–1612), daughter of William Bourchier, 3rd Earl of Bath (died 1623), in the Bedford Chapel at Chenies, Buckinghamshire. The arms of Cogan (a branch of which later became known as Goggin) are variously blazoned elsewhere as oak leaves, aspen leaves, etc.)

- John de Cogan (died 1302), to whom Edmund of Lancaster surrendered the barony in 1267, was the son of William Cogan, who was a grandson of Fulk Paynel (died 1208), being the son of Fulk's daughter Christiana by her husband Miles de Cogan (died 1182). Miles de Cogan was according to the antiquary Sir William Pole (died 1635) the great soldier and undertaker of the Irish Conquest. John de Cogan was recorded as holding his lands at Bampton by the feudal tenure per baroniam ("by barony") by the service of 1 knight's fee and performed the service in 1277 Risdon stated that at Bampton the Cogans "had...a very stately house and kept great entertainment when they lived here, and having greater possessions in Ireland for the most part dwelt there".
- Thomas de Cogan (died 1315), son and heir
- Richard de Cogan (1299–1368) On 17 March 1336 Richard Cogan obtained a royal licence to crenellate his mansion-house at Baumton, and to enclose his wood of Uffculme and 300 acres of land for a deer-park. The house is believed by Lysons (1822) to have been near the castle keep, but no remains of the buildings survive. It was the residence of the Cogans and their successors, down to the time of the Bourchiers. He married Mary Montagu, a daughter of William Montagu, 2nd Baron Montagu (c. 1285 – 1319)
- John Cogan (died 1382), who died as a minor in the wardship of the king, was the son of Sir William Cogan (died 1382) by his second wife Isabel Loring, the elder daughter and co-heiress of Sir Nele Loring (c. 1320 – 1386), KG, of Knowstone and Landkey in Devon and of Chalgrave, Bedfordshire, a founding member of the Order of the Garter. John's heiress was his sister Elizabeth Cogan, the wife of Fulk FitzWarin, 5th Baron FitzWarin (1362–1391), who from his mother Margaret Audley, 3rd daughter and co-heiress of James Audley, 2nd Baron Audley (died 1386), feudal baron of Barnstaple, was the heir to the manor of Tawstock which had become the later seat of the feudal barons of Barnstaple, and where the Bourchiers later made their principal seat.

=== FitzWarin ===
Arms of FitzWarin: Quarterly per fess indented argent and gules

The FitzWarin family were powerful Marcher Lords seated at Whittington Castle in Shropshire and at Alveston in Gloucestershire. The title Baron FitzWarin was created by writ of summons for Fulk FitzWarine in 1295. The descent of the barony of Bampton in the FitzWarin family is as follows:

- Fulk FitzWarin, 5th Baron FitzWarin (1362–1391), husband of Elizabeth Cogan, heiress of Bampton.
- Fulk FitzWarin, 6th Baron FitzWarin (1389–1407), son.
- Fulk FitzWarin, 7th Baron FitzWarin (1406–1420), son, died aged 14 when his heir became his sister Elizabeth FitzWarin.
- Elizabeth FitzWarin, 8th Baroness FitzWarin (c. 1404 – c. 1427), sister, married Richard Hankford, son and heir of Richard Hankford (dvp 1419), son of Sir William Hankford (c. 1350 – 1423), of Annery, Devon, Chief Justice of the King's Bench. Upon her death the barony must have been in abeyance between her daughters Thomasine Hankford (1423–1453) and Elizabeth Hankford (c. 1424 – 1433) until the death of the latter in 1433.

=== Hankford ===
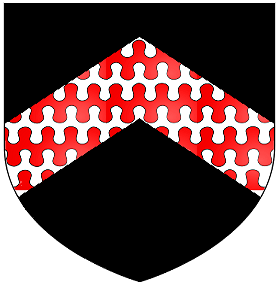
Arms of Hankford of Annery, Devon: Sable, a chevron barry nebuly argent and gules

Sir Richard Hankford (c. 1397 – 1431) (grandson and heir of Sir William Hankford (died 1422) of Annery, Devon, Lord Chief Justice of England) married as his first wife Elizabeth FitzWarin, 8th Baroness FitzWarin (c. 1404 – c. 1427). Upon her death the barony must have been in abeyance between her daughters Thomasine Hankford (1423–1453), born and baptised at Tawstock, and Elizabeth Hankford (c. 1424 – 1433) until the death of the latter in 1433, when Thomasine became 9th Baroness.

=== Bourchier ===
Canting arms of Bourchier: Argent, a cross engrailed gules between four water bougets sable. Badge: Bourchier knot

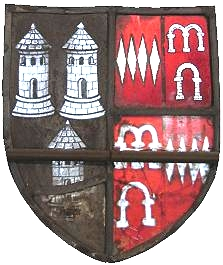
Arms of Sapcotes Sable, three dovecotes argent (Note: Also the arms of the ancient family of Shapcott of Shapcott in the parish of Knowstone, Devon, sometimes shown with a chevron or between the dovecotes) impaling Dinham Gules, four fusils in fess ermine (quartering Arches Gules, three arches argent), Bampton Church

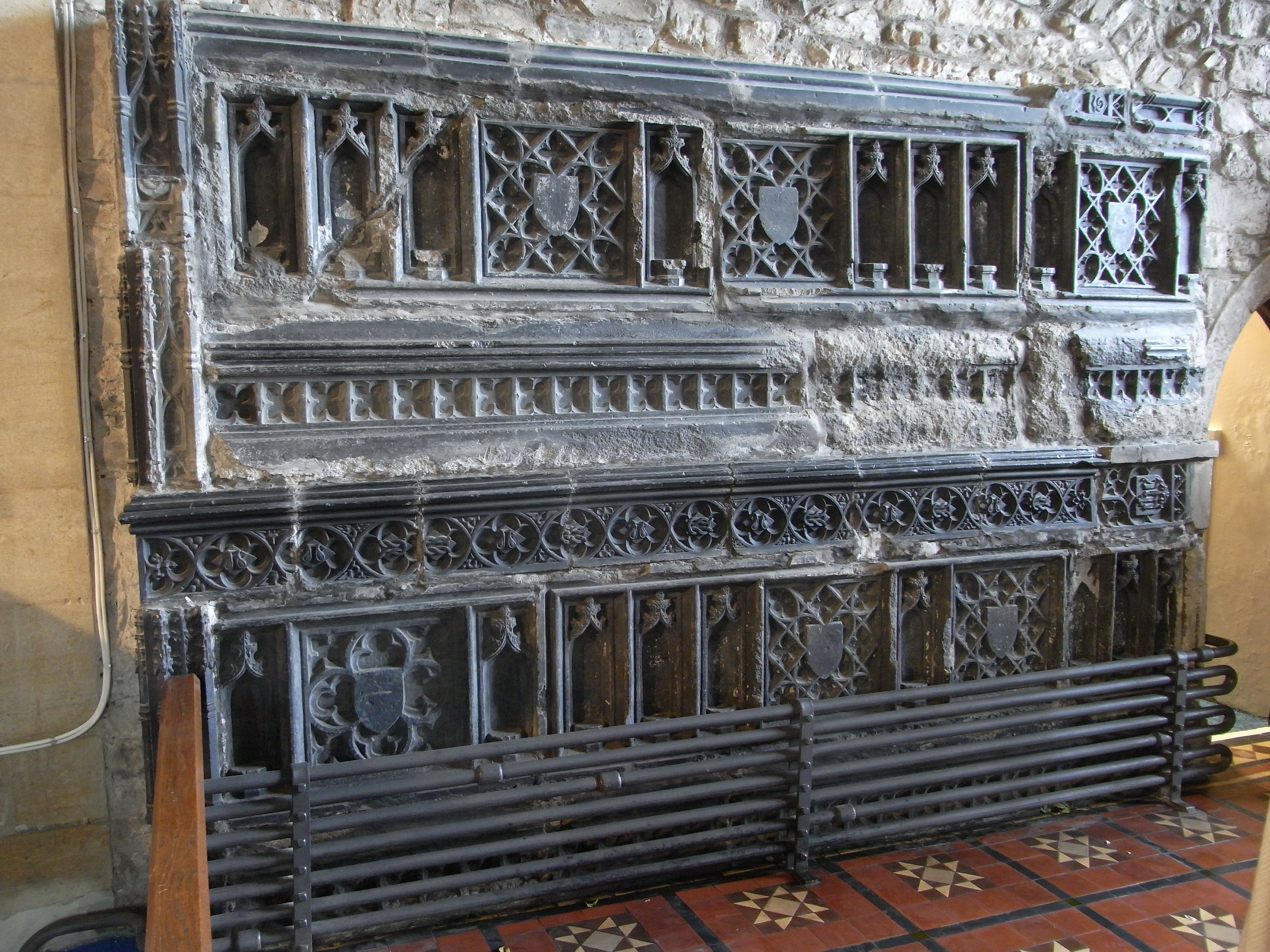
Superimposed remnants of former chest tomb said by Pevsner to be that of Thomasine Hankford (died 1453), wife of William Bourchier (1407–1470), north wall of chancel, Bampton Church, Devon

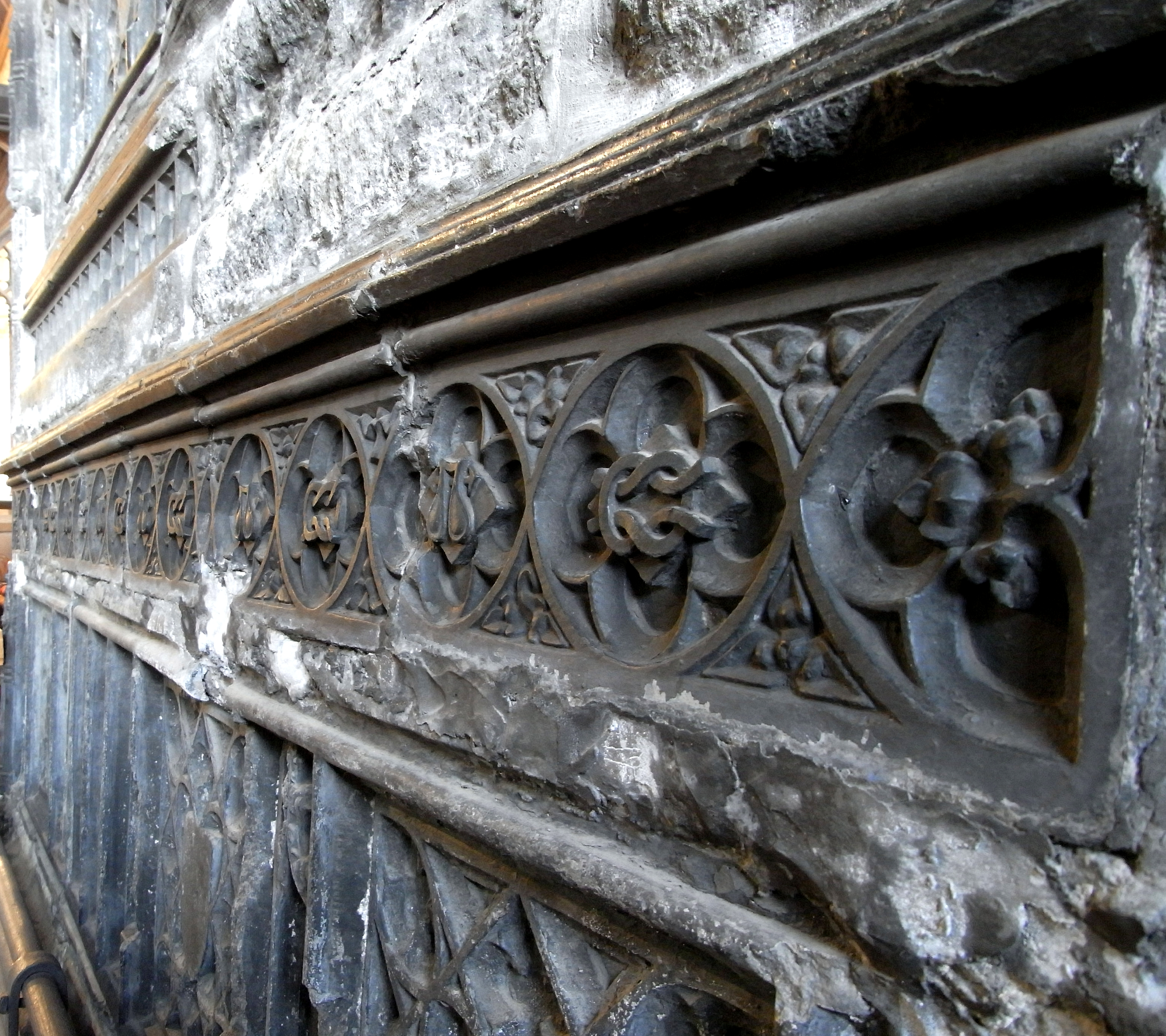
Detail from Bourchier tomb remnant, Bampton Church, showing in a row within quatrefoils Bourchier knots alternating with water bougets of the Bourchier arms

The Bourchier family, the Devon branch of which, seated at Tawstock Court, was later created Earls of Bath, retained the manor of Bampton until at least the time of Risdon (died 1640) who states in his Survey of Devon that "the Earl of Bath is lord of this manor". The descent of Bampton was as follows:

- William Bourchier, 9th Baron FitzWarin (1407–1470), husband of Thomasine Hankeford, 9th Baroness FitzWarin (1423–1453). He was the 2nd son of William Bourchier, 1st Count of Eu (1386–1420) by his wife Anne of Gloucester (1383–1438), eldest daughter of Thomas of Woodstock, 1st Duke of Gloucester (1355–1397) (by his wife Eleanor de Bohun), youngest child of King Edward III. He was summoned to Parliament as Lord FitzWarin in right of his wife and is thus deemed to have become 9th Baron FitzWarin. William Bourchier had three distinguished brothers: Henry Bourchier, 1st Earl of Essex (1404 – 4 April 1483), eldest brother; John Bourchier, 1st Baron Berners (1415–1474), younger brother; and Thomas Bourchier, (c. 1404 – 1486), Archbishop of Canterbury and a cardinal, youngest brother. His sister Eleanor Bourchier, (c. 1417 – 1474) married John de Mowbray, 3rd Duke of Norfolk. Thomasine was buried in Bampton Church, and the surviving fragments of a tomb chest there re-set into the north wall of the chancel and displaying in a row within quatrefoils Bourchier Knots alternating with water bougets of the Bourchier arms is said by Pevsner to be that of Thomasine Hankford (died 1453), wife of William Bourchier (1407–1470) William Bourchier died before 12 December 1469 and was buried in the Church of the Austin Friars in London. His will was dated at Bampton 13 February 1466/7.
- Fulk Bourchier, Baron FitzWarin (died 1480). (son) He requested in his will to be buried at Bampton near the graves of his parents. He married Elizabeth Dinham, one of the four sisters and co-heiresses of John Dynham, 1st Baron Dynham (1433–1501), KG, of Nutwell, Devon. Elizabeth remarried to Sir John Sapcotes, and a stained glass heraldic escutcheon survives in Bampton church showing the arms of Sapcotes impaling Dinham.
- John Bourchier, 1st Earl of Bath (1470–1539), (son) created Earl of Bath in 1536. He married Cecilia Daubeny, daughter of Sir Giles Daubeney and heiress of her brother Henry Daubeney, Earl of Bridgewater. His magnificent tomb with effigies of himself, his wife and their eight children was situated in the Bourchier Chapel of Bampton Church until its destruction after 1770
- John Bourchier, 2nd Earl of Bath (1499–1561), (son) who married Elizabeth Hungerford, daughter of Sir Walter Hungerford, and secondly Eleanor Manners, daughter of George Manners, 11th Baron de Ros, by whom he had John Bourchier, Lord FitzWarin.
- William Bourchier, 3rd Earl of Bath (bef. 1557–1623), (grandson, son of John Bourchier, Lord FitzWarin, who predeceased his own father). By his time the family had its main seat at Tawstock, and in the church there the 3rd Earl is buried and where survives his magnificent tomb and effigy. He married Elizabeth Russell, daughter of Francis Russell, 2nd Earl of Bedford (died 1585)

=== Wrey ===
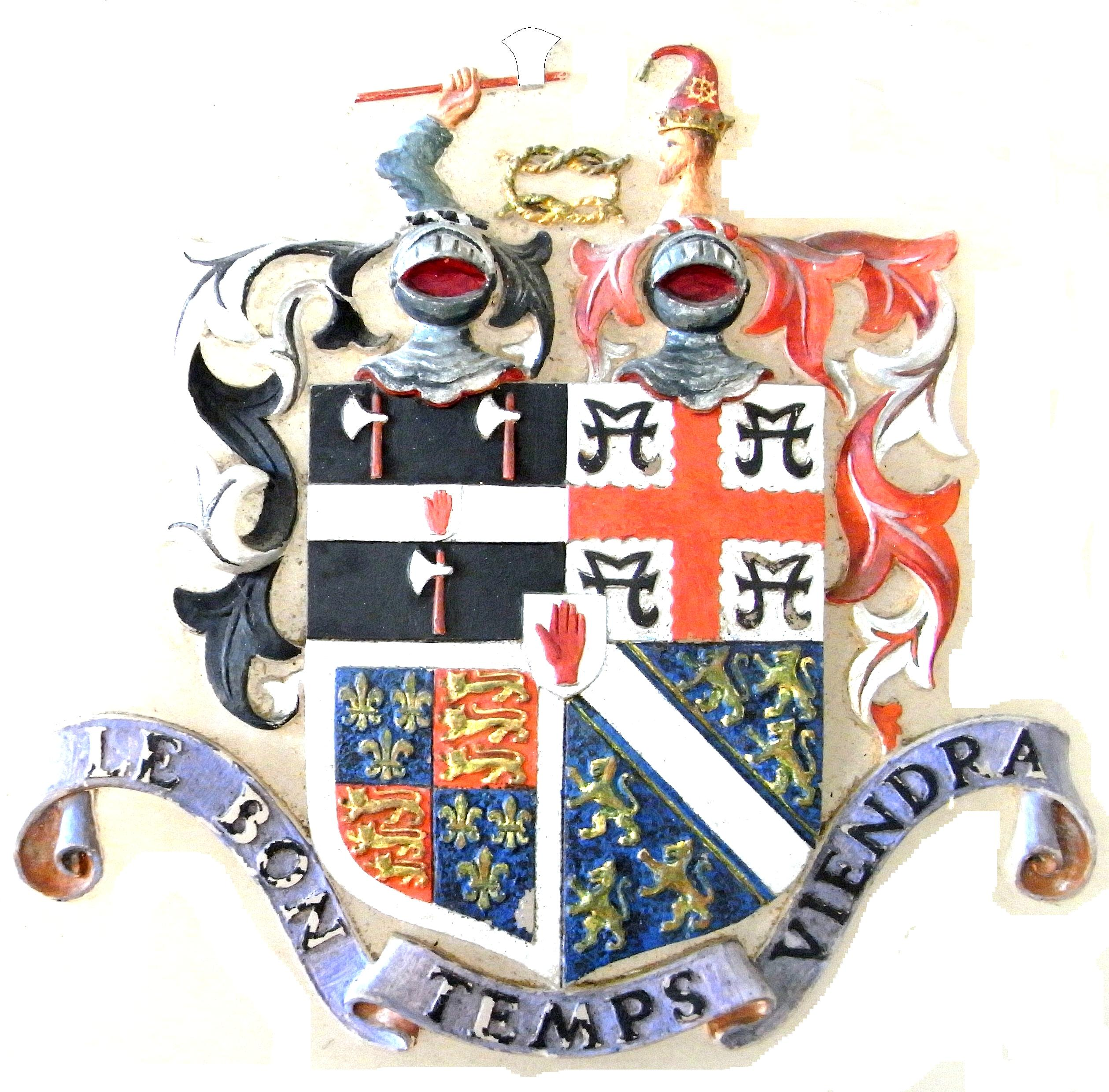
Arms of Wrey Baronets: Quarterly: 1st: Sable, a fesse between three pole-axes argent helved gules (Wrey); 2nd: Bourchier; 3rd: Within a bordure argent Plantagenet; 4th: de Bohun. Over-all is the Red Hand of Ulster. (Note: Above the shield in the centre is a Bourchier Knot or. Above to the dexter is the crest of Wrey: A cubit arm embowed holding a pole-axe argent helved gules, on the sinister side is the crest of Bourchier: A man's head in profile proper ducally crowned or with a pointed cap gules On a scroll underneath the motto of Bourchier: Le Bon Temps Viendra ("The right time will come"))

The heir of the Bourchiers was the Wrey family of Trebeigh Manor, St Ive, Cornwall. On the death of Henry Bourchier, 5th Earl of Bath (died 1654), the last in the male line, the title became extinct. The co-heiresses to the Bourchier lands became the three daughters of his first cousin once removed Edward Bourchier, 4th Earl of Bath (1590–1636). The 3rd daughter, Lady Anne Bourchier (born 1631), married firstly James Cranfield, 2nd Earl of Middlesex, the issue of which marriage was soon extinct and secondly to Sir Chichester Wrey, 3rd Baronet (1628–1668), whose descendants inherited the principal Bourchier seat of Tawstock. The Devon biographer John Prince (died 1723) stated that in his day the most part of Bampton remained the posterity of the former Earls of Bath and was the "noble seat" of Lady Wrey, dowager of Sir Bourchier Wrey, 4th Baronet (died 1696). (Note: Prince's statement reported by Rev. John Swete, per Gray, Todd & Rowe, Margery (Eds.), Travels in Georgian Devon: The Illustrated Journals of The Reverend John Swete, 1789–1800, 4 vols., Tiverton, 1999, vol.3, p.54. Original source of quote in Prince's Worthies of Devon not stated.)

=== Tristram ===
An old mansion near Bampton Castle, called Castle Grove, was the residence of the Tristram family, who according to Lysons (1822) probably purchased it from the Bourchiers. A mural monument to John Tristram (1668–1722), last of the family to occupy the estate of Duvale within the parish of Bampton, exists in the parish church. (Note: Lysons, 1822: "Deuvale, in this parish, belonged successively to the families of Dennis, Cruwys, and Tristram. It was some time since the property of the late Rev. Mr. Newte and now belongs to J. N. Fazakerly, Esq. M.P.") In 1822, the site of the castle was the property of Robert Lucas, Esq., heir to the Tristram family.

=== Arnold ===
In 1720, the manor of Bampton was owned by William Arnold, gentleman.

=== Fellowes ===
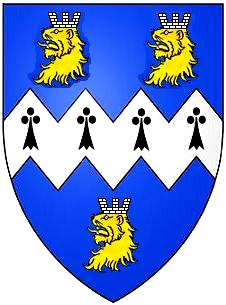
Arms of Fellowes of Eggesford: Azure, a fesse indented ermine between three lion's heads erased or murally crowned argent

In 1720, the manor of Bampton was purchased from William Arnold by William Fellowes (died 1724) and his brother Sir John Fellowes, 1st Baronet (died 1724), Deputy Governor of the South Sea Company. The latter died childless.

The following deeds are held by Norfolk Record Office:

"Deeds re £30,000 for purchase of estate for William Fellowes, his son-in-law, left by will of Joseph Martyn 1715; manors of Eggesford, Chawley, Borriston, Cheldon, Cudlip, East Warlington, Witheridge, Drayton; hundred of Witheridge; capital messuage called Eggesford, and farm and advowson, Devon, and manor of Mountsey and estates, Somerset, Lord Doneralle to William Fellowes 1718".

William Fellowes died on 19 January 1723 and was buried at Eggesford, where a neo-classical monument survives in Eggesford Church. (Note: Monument inscribed: "M(emoriae) S(acrum) Gulielmi Fellowes Arm(ige)ri almae curiae cancellariae Magistri quo officio tenente summa legis et aequitatis cura decessit 19.mo (undevicensimo) Jan(uar)ii 1723 aeta(tis) 64. Mariam Josephi Martyn de London mercatoris viri integritate insignis filiam et haeredem duxit; liberos quinqe ex ea genitos viz (videlicet) tres filios et duas filias reliquit. Familiam diu hic permanere cupiens ossa sua hoc in loco deponi voluit". Which may be translated into English as: "Sacred to the memory of William Fellowes, Esquire, Master of the Court of Chancery in holding which office in the highest care of law and equity he departed on the 19th of January 1723 of his age 64. He married Mary the daughter and heir of Joseph Martyn of London, merchant, a man outstanding in integrity; he left five children born from her namely three sons and two daughters. Desiring his family long to remain here he wished his bones to be deposited in this place".) His elder son Coulson Fellowes (1696–1769), married Urania Herbert, daughter of Francis Herbert of Oakly Park, Shropshire. The marriage settlement dated 1725 required him to transfer to trustees in tail male the following lands:

"Manors of Eggesford, Chawley also Chawleigh, Borrington also Burrington, Cheldon Cudlip East Worlington Witherigges also Witheridge and Drayford, the Hundred of Witherigges, the capital messuage called Eggesford in Eggesford parish and Chawley, other lands in parish of Eggesford, Wembworthy, Chawley, Borrington, Winkley Rings Ash Dowland Rose Ash Crediton, South Tawton, Great Torrington, Cholmley Cheldon Cudlip East Worlington Witheridges and Drayford, parts of the Manor, borough, hundred, rights and lands of Northtawton, the Manor, borough, hundred, rights and lands of Brampton (sic, Bampton), the Manor of Hollacomb Parramore in p. of Wynkley, lands in Winkley and Winkley Town, messuages in Goldsmith Street and Keylane by Key Gate, Exeter, parts of messuages in Moreton Hamstead and Chagford and the advowsons of the churches of Eggesford, Chawley, Cheldon, and East Worlington, Devon, and the Manor of Mountsey also Mounyseaux and lands in Mounseaux and Dullverton, Somerset".

Coulson Fellowes married in 1768 Lavinia Smyth, daughter of James Smyth of St Audries, Somerset, and had children, their elder son being William Henry Fellowes (1769–1837). Henry Arthur Fellowes, the younger son to whom the Devon properties passed, died in 1792.

=== Wallop/Fellowes ===
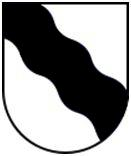
Arms of Wallop, Earls of Portsmouth: Argent, a bend wavy sable

In 1822, the barony was the property of the Honourable Newton Fellowes, (1772–1854) of Eggesford. He was born Newton Wallop, the younger son of John Wallop, 2nd Earl of Portsmouth (died 1797) and his wife Urania Fellowes, sister of Henry Arthur Fellows (died 1792). He changed his name to Fellowes after having become heir to the Fellowes estates, including Eggesford and Bampton, and eventually inherited the Earldom of Portsmouth as 4th Earl, after the death of his elder brother John Wallop, 3rd Earl of Portsmouth (1767–1853).
