= Petton =

Petton may refer to:

- Petton, Devon, a village in the civil parish of Bampton, Devon, England
- Petton, Shropshire, a village and civil parish in the county of Shropshire, England
