= FutureMedia =

- Company type: Nonprofit
- Industry: social media, digital media, mobile media
- Founded: 2009
- Founder: Duquan Brown; Chase Wimberly
- Headquarters: Atlanta, Georgia, USA
- Parent: Georgia Tech Research Institute
- Website: www.gtri.gatech.edu/elsys

FutureMedia is a program that analyzes the state and future of digital, social, and mobile media. It functions as a collaborative initiative at Georgia Tech and the Georgia Tech Research Institute. FutureMedia consults approximately 500 faculty members working in those fields.

== History ==
In 2019, Future Media expanded into the Direct-To-Consumer market by acquiring Australian watchmaker Oak & Jackal.

== Programs ==
=== FutureMedia Fest ===
The organization most recently hosted FutureMedia Fest 2010, a four-day conference (Oct 4–7, 2010) with a keynote addresses from Michael Jones, the chief technology advocate at Google. The event featured panels, workshops, and technology demonstrations.

=== FutureMedia Outlook ===
Contemporaneous with FutureMedia Fest 2010, the organization released the FutureMedia Outlook, an analysis of the future of media, concentrating on six major trends in those fields, including information overload, personalization, data integrity, an expectation of multimedia, augmented reality, and collaborative software.
