= Circuit of culture =

Framework used in the field of cultural studies

The circuit of culture is a theory or framework used in the area of cultural studies.

The theory was devised in 1997 by a group of theorists when studying the Walkman cassette player. The theory suggests that in studying a cultural text or artifact you must look at five aspects: its representation, identity, production, consumption and regulation. Du Gay et al. suggest, that "taken together, (these 5 points) complete a sort of circuit...through which any analysis of a cultural text...must pass if it is to be adequately studied."

Gerard Goggin openly uses this framework in his book Cell Phone Culture: Mobile technology in everyday life in order to fully understand the cell phone as a cultural artifact. His book is split into four parts: production, consumption, regulation, and representation and identity (through looking at mobile convergences).
