= Miles de Cogan =

Anglo-Norman knight

Milo de Cogan (fl. 1170–1182) was an Anglo-Norman knight from Glamorgan who played a significant role in the Norman conquest of Ireland under Richard de Clare, 2nd Earl of Pembroke; a man better known to Irish history as Strongbow.

== Origins ==
The family took its name from the manor of Cogan, in Glamorgan, Wales, now a suburb of Penarth, 4.5 miles (7.2 km) southwest of Cardiff. He was a nephew of Robert FitzStephen and Maurice FitzGerald. The Cartae Baronum of 1166 in the Liber Niger Scaccarii recorded Milo as holding Cogan as two knights' fees, under the overlordship of William Fitz Robert, 2nd Earl of Gloucester (d.1183).

This family is believed to trace back to the original Viking settlers of Normandy.

== Career ==
In August of 1170, Milo joined his uncles in sailing to Ireland with Strongbow. Less than a month later, he led one of two bands in an assault on Dublin, his cousin, Raymond FitzGerald having led the other. These bands sacked the city and slaughtered many of its inhabitants. Milo was afterwards made constable of the settlement.

In 1171, the king of Dublin, Ascall mac Ragnaill, who had successfully fled, returned with 60 ships and assaulted the city. Milo boldly sallied out to meet them, but was quickly driven back. His brother, Richard, however, had remained hidden behind the attackers and fell upon them from the rear, causing a panic which allowed most of them to be killed, while some fled. Ascall was captured and beheaded on Milo's order, having threatened to return if he were ransomed.

Shortly thereafter, Dublin was again besieged, this time by Ruaidrí Ua Conchobair, who brought 30,000 men to this end. Milo led one of three small contingents in a sally outside the castle walls, defeating the besiegers against all odds.

Another siege was laid in 1172, led by Tigernán Ua Ruairc, which Milo ably defeated, once again sallying out to surprise and rout the attackers. Later that year, Milo took part in the capture of Limerick and was given command of its garrison.

Thereafter, he spent two years fighting in England and France, under the banner of Henry II, together with Robert FitzStephen. In 1177, the two of them were granted, the Kingdom of Cork, to be held by the feudal tenure of 60 knights' fees.

== Marriage and children ==
He married Christiana Paynel, a daughter of Fulk Paynel II (c. 1118 - c. 1208), feudal baron of Bampton, Devon. His children included:

- William de Cogan, his heir as tenant of Cogan, who at some time before 1182 witnessed three charters of Margam Abbey, Glamorgan. He was appointed constable of Neath Castle, Glamorgan, at some time after 1184.
- Another possible relative was John de Cogan, who granted land in Penarth to St Augustine's Abbey in Bristol.

== Death ==
According to his cousin, Gerald of Wales, Milo de Cogan and Robert FitzStephen, along with one of FitzStephen's sons, Ralph, who was also Milo's son in law, were en route from Desmond to Lismore in 1182, to negotiate with the people of Waterford, when a certain Mac Tyre, who had invited them to lodge with him, crept up behind them with a few men and murdered them with long axes.

Irish accounts relay that in fact, Milo and FitzStephen were marching to attack Waterford when Mac Tyre, king of Uí Meic Caille, slaughtered them and their host, possibly including Raymond FitzGerald and another of FitzStephen's sons. Gerald's text warns his readers of an alleged habit of the Irish in spreading plainly false rumours concerning the deaths of their enemies.

== Later succession ==
The succession can be traced through the history of the Feudal barony of Bampton.

- Richard de Cogan (thought to have been the son of William de Cogan, son of Miles), in 1207 received large grants of land in Ireland. The descent from him was as follows:
- John I de Cogan (died 1278). In the extent made in 1262 he was recorded as holding two fees in Cogan, valued at £10. In 1267, he obtained the feudal barony of Bampton in Devon, surrendered to him after the death of Edmund of Lancaster (died 1296), who had taken it into his wardship following the death of Auda Paynel (died 1261), wife of John II de Ballon (died 1275) of Much Marcle, Herefordshire, and heiress of the Paynel barony of Bampton. (Note: Sanders gives John de Cogan's date of death as 1302, and whose subsequent pedigree differs from that given by the Inventory of Ancient Monuments in Glamorgan, Royal Commission on Ancient and Historic Monuments in Wales.) The Devon historian Tristram Risdon (died 1640) stated that at Bampton the Cogans "had...a very stately house and kept great entertainment when they lived here, and having greater possessions in Ireland for the most part dwelt there".
- John II de Cogan. (son). He received livery of his inheritance in 1280/81 and was still alive in 1320 when recorded as a tenant in the survey made in that year by Hugh Despencer, Lord of Glamorgan.
- (a later descendant) Richard de Cogan (died 1368/69)
- John III de Cogan (died 1389), only son and last in the male line. His heir to his lands in Ireland, Devon and Somerset was his sister Elizabeth.

Descendants of collateral lines of this family eventually adopted the names of Gogan and Goggin, which name is common in Ireland today.
