= Goggins =

Goggins may refer to:

== Places ==
- Goggins, Georgia (also called Goggans", "Goggans Station", "Goggansville", "Goggins Station", and "Gogginsville"), an unincorporated community
- Goggins Mine, a former gold mine in Placer County, California
- Goggins Mountain, in Johnson's Shut-Ins State Park, in Missouri

== People ==
Notable people with the surname include:

- B. R. Goggins (1858–1937), American lawyer and politician
- Coman Goggins, Irish Gaelic footballer
- David Goggins (born 1975), ultramarathon runner and author; a former US Navy SEAL
- Juanita Goggins (1934–2010), American politician
- Mitchell Goggins (1850–?), American politician
- Paul Goggins (1953–2014), British politician
- Peter Goggins (1894–1917), British soldier who was executed for desertion during World War I
- Rodney Goggins (born 1978), Irish snooker player
- Saratha Goggins (born 1950/51), American politician
- Walton Goggins (born 1971), American actor

== See also ==
- Goggin, a surname
