= William Goggin =

William Goggin may refer to:

- William L. Goggin (1807–1870), Whig politician and lawyer from Virginia
- William C. Goggin (1911–1988), American chemist, business manager and business theorist
- Bill Goggin (born 1941), Australian rules football player
