= Tom Yandle =

British farmer and huntsman (1935–2026)

Thomas Andrew Heath Yandle (30 November 1935 – 15 October 2026) was a British farmer and huntsman. From Riphay, Brushford, near Dulverton in Somerset, England, he served as chairman of the Devon and Somerset Staghounds and was High Sheriff of Somerset in 1999. He was also a committee member of both the National Trust and Exmoor National Park.

== Biography ==
Thomas Andrew Heath Yandle was born in Riphay Barton on 30 November 1935. He played a leading role in challenging both the National Trust's decision to ban stag hunting on the Holnicote Estate and the Labour government's ultimately successful proposal to ban hunting with hounds.

The Yandle family was previously resident at nearby Duvale an historic estate in the parish of Bampton, Devon. In 1994 he purchased Northmoor House near Dulverton, and 100 acres of surrounding land, which he later sold.

Yandle died on 15 October 2026, aged 90.
