= John Bampton (theologian) =

John Bampton (fl. 1340) was an English Carmelite theologian of the fourteenth century.

== Life ==
Bampton was born at Bampton, Devon. Bale, quoting Leland, states that he paid special attention to the works of Aristotle, and was admitted to his doctor's degree in divinity.

== Works ==
The titles of two treatises by this author have been preserved, respectively entitled Octo quæstiones de veritate propositionum and Lecturæ scholasticæ in Theologiâ.
