= Mobile media =

Portable forms of media

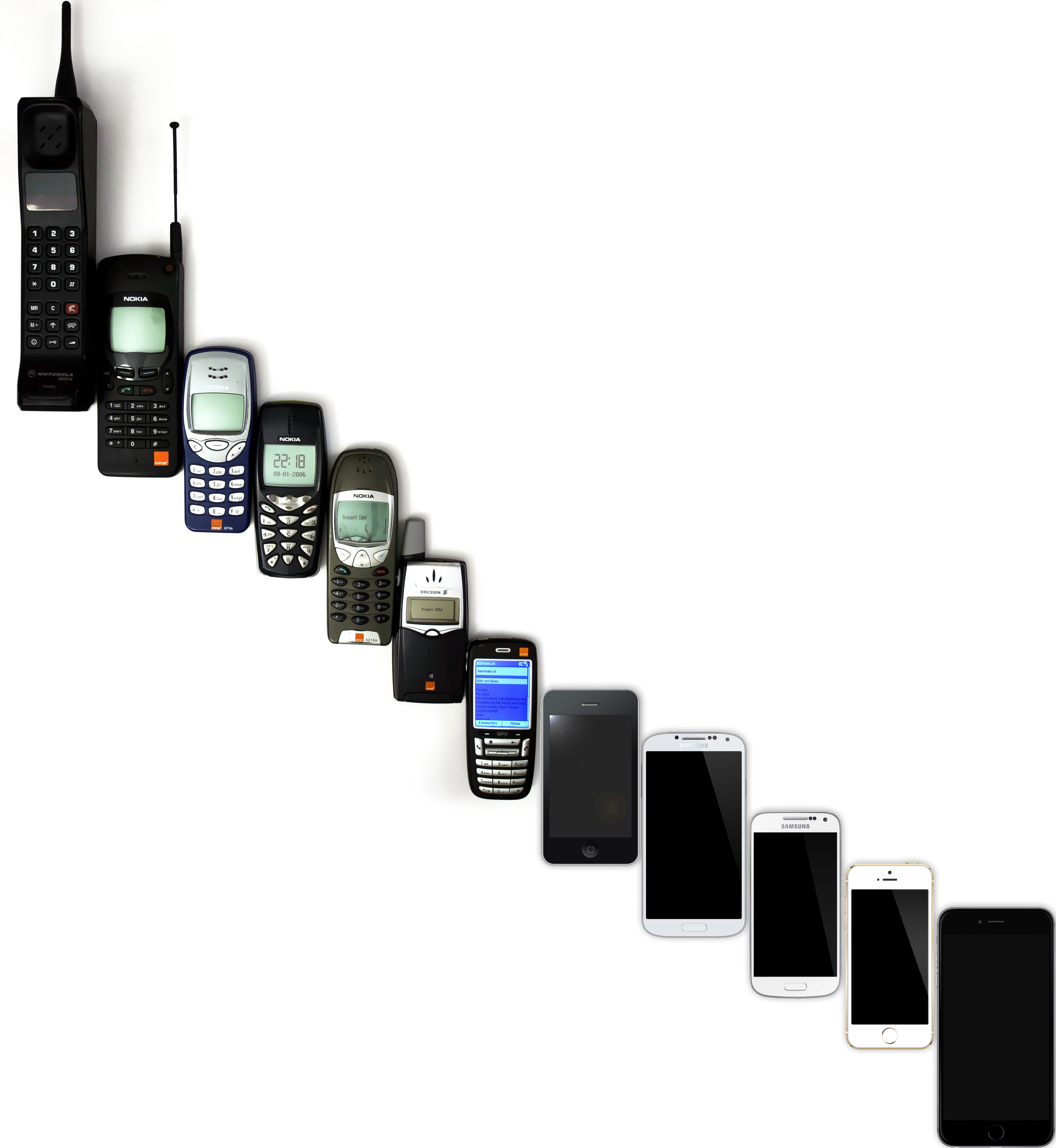
The evolution of the mobile phone.

Mobile media has been defined as: "a personal, interactive, internet-enabled and user-controlled portable platform that provides for the exchange of and sharing of personal and non-personal information among users who are inter-connected." The notion of making media mobile can be traced back to the “first time someone thought to write on a tablet Mobile media makes it possible to communicate using portable devices, providing users a way to exchange information with other individuals connected via Internet. On the other hand, mass media usually delivers information from a single source to a wide audience, mobile communications enable interactive communication and allow many people to participate. Mobile media enables creating and sharing content, staying in touch with one another, and gaining information via mobile devices. Mobile news and social networking show how mobile media has changed the methods of the way people receive and Transmit information that could be lifted and hauled – rather than on a cave wall, a cliff face, a monument that usually was stuck in place, more or less forever”. In his book Cellphone, Paul Levinson refers to mobile media as “the media-in-motion business.” Since their incarnation, mobile phones as a means of communication have been a focus of great fascination as well as debate. In the book, Studying Mobile Media: Cultural Technologies, Mobile Communication, and the iPhone, Gerard Goggin notes how the ability of portable voice communication to provide ceaseless contact complicates the relationship between the public and private spheres of society. Lee Humphreys' explains in her book that now, "more people in the world today have a mobile phone than have an Internet connection".

== History ==
The development of the portable telephone can be traced back to its use by the military in the late nineteenth-century. By the 1930s, police cars in several major U.S. cities were equipped with one-way mobile radios. In 1931, the Galvin Manufacturing Corporation designed a mass market two-way radio. This radio was named Motorola, which also became the new name for the company in 1947. In 1943, Motorola developed the first portable radiotelephone, the Walkie-Talkie, for use by the American forces during World War II. After the war, two-way radio technology was developed for civilian use. In 1946, AT&T and Southwestern Bell made available the first commercial mobile radiotelephone. This service allowed calls to be made from a fixed phone to a mobile one.

"Many scholars have noted and praised the mobility of reading brought about the emergence of the book and the advent of early modern print culture". Along with the book, the transistor radio, the Walkman, and the Kodak camera are also bearers of portable information and early examples of mobile media consumption. With the rise of the internet, many forms of media can be considered mobile. Forms of mobile media, such as podcasts and even social networking services, are some of the few that can be downloaded, used or even streamed over the internet. According to Jordan Frith and Didem Ozkul in their book, Mobile Media Beyond Mobile Phones, they believe that mobile media has moved beyond our past knowledge of mobile media. "With this issue, we realized that not only has our understanding of mobile media expanded beyond the mobile phone, but our thinking of the 'mobile in front of media has evolved". From The Mobile Reader, Jason Farman and other authors describe this expansion of mobile media. "The cultural shift that happened in conjunction with the printing press can be mapped onto our uses of mobile media (especially location-aware technologies): the cultural imaginaries of space became simultaneously about experiencing the expansion of space, an increase in speed of transmission, and a transformed view of the local".

For a time, mobile phones and PDAs (Personal Digital Assistants) were the primary source of portable media from which we could obtain information and communicate with one another. More recently, the smartphone has rendered the PDA obsolete by combining many features of the cell phone with those of the PDA. In 2011, the growth of new mobile media as a true force in society was marked by smartphone sales outpacing personal computer sales. With this non-stop consumption of new and improved smartphones, theorists such as Marsha Berry and Max Schleser explain that these change the way we can do things in life. "With the rise of smartphones in 2007 and proliferation of application through Apple's App Store and Android Market in the following year, how citizen users and creative professionals represent, experience and share the everyday is changing".

While mobile phone independent technologies and functions may be new and innovative (in relation to changes and improvements in media capabilities in respect to their function what they can do when and where and what they look like, in regard to their size and shape) the need and desire to access and use media devices regardless of where we are in the world has been around for centuries. Indeed, Paul Levinson remarks, in regard to telephonic communication, that it was “intelligence and inventiveness" applied to our need to communicate regardless of where we may be, led logically and eventually to telephones that we carry in our pockets”. Levinson credits the printing press for disseminating information to a mass audience, the reduction in size and portability of the camera for allowing people to capture what they saw regardless of their location, and the Internet for providing on-demand information.

Smartphones have altered the very structure of society. "With this issue, we realized that not only has our understanding of mobile media expanded beyond the mobile phone, but our thinking of the 'mobile' in front of media has evolved". The ability of smartphones to transcend certain boundaries of times and space has revolutionized the nature of communication, allowing it to be both synchronous and asynchronous. These devices and their corresponding media technologies, such as cloud-based technologies, play an increasingly important role in the everyday lives of millions of people worldwide.

== See also ==
- Location-based media
- Web film
- Documentary practice
- Mass media
