= Bampton Castle, Devon =

Bampton Castle
- Bampton, Devon, England
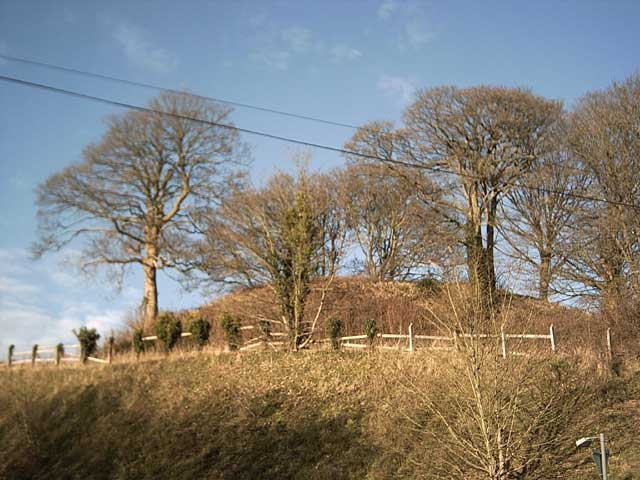
- Remains of motte

Location
- Shown within Devon
- Coordinates: 50.99245°N 3.48467°W
- Grid reference: grid reference SS959225

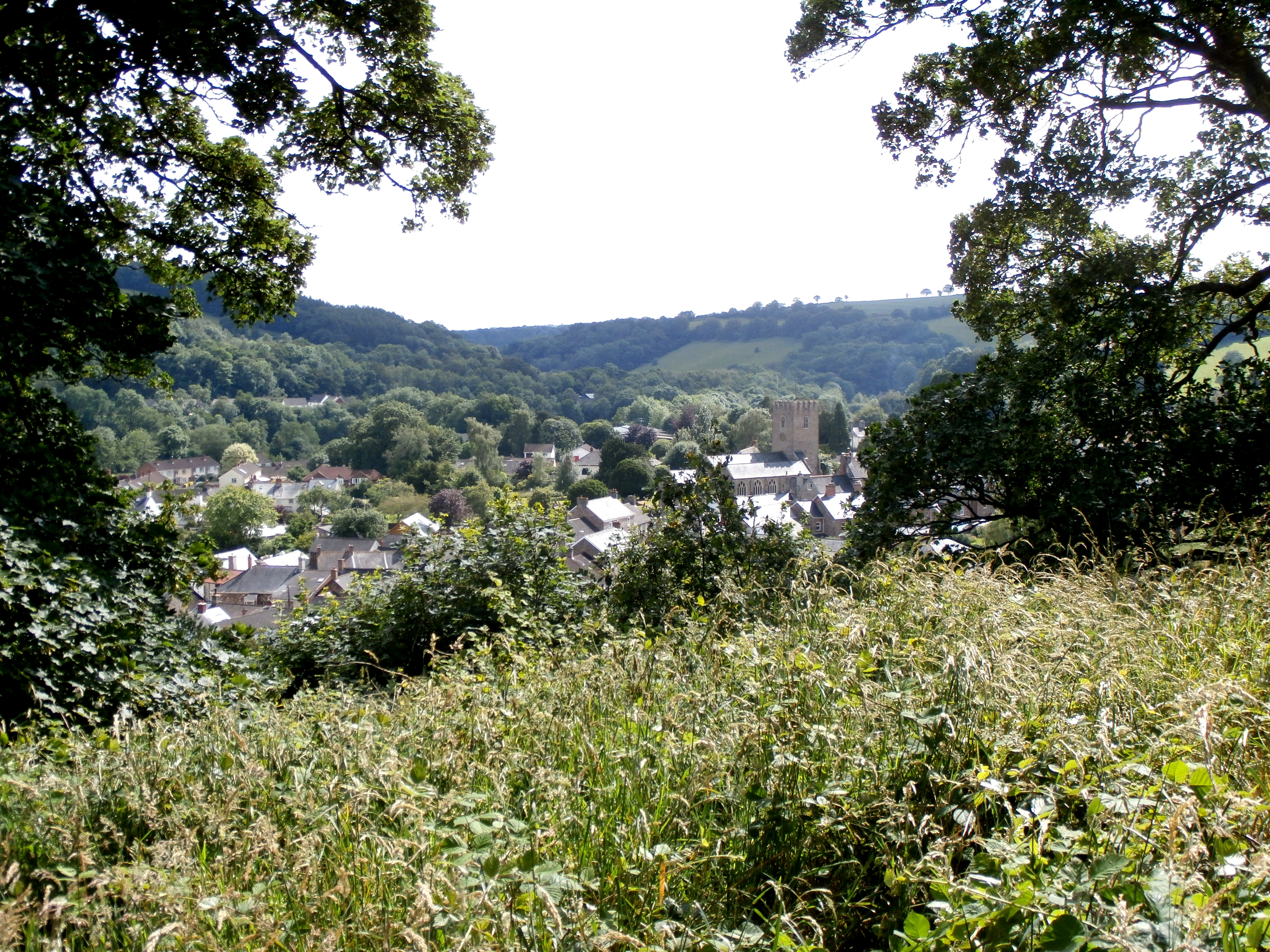
View from top of motte of Bampton Castle, looking south-westwards towards Bampton Church and the village of Bampton

Bampton Castle in the parish of Bampton, Devon was the seat of the feudal barony of Bampton. It is located on a spur that overlooks the River Batherm.

== History ==
In Saxon times a defensive mound was built. After the Norman Conquest of England following the Battle of Hastings of 1066, the land the buildings on it, captured from Edward the Elder, were awarded to Walter Douai, who had established himself at the location by 1086. He, or perhaps his son Robert, were the ones to erect the first fortification at the site. It was a simple fortification, employing the motte and bailey style of defence. A twelve-meter motte was fortified by a timbre palisade on top. The motte was square in shape, with one side protected by the river.

In 1136, during the civil war it was used against the King. King Stephen laid siege to the castle and the fortifications were burnt down. Later, a stone mansion was built on the motte, and in 1336 the lord of the manor, Richard Cogan, obtained a royal licence to crenellate it and surround it with a stone and mortar wall. It is believed that in 1607 part of the building fell down due to an earthquake. Since then the stonework has all been removed but the motte survives as a prominent mound on the outskirts of the village. Today the remains of the castle exist on a high mound around sixty meters in a diameter, which is surrounded by a circular, partially buried ditch. Ruins of a rectangular enclosure exist to the east that is around seventy five meters by sixty meters.

== See also ==
- Castles in Great Britain and Ireland
- List of castles in England
