= Petton, Devon =

Village in Devon, England

Coordinates: 51.01305°N 3.41892°W

Petton
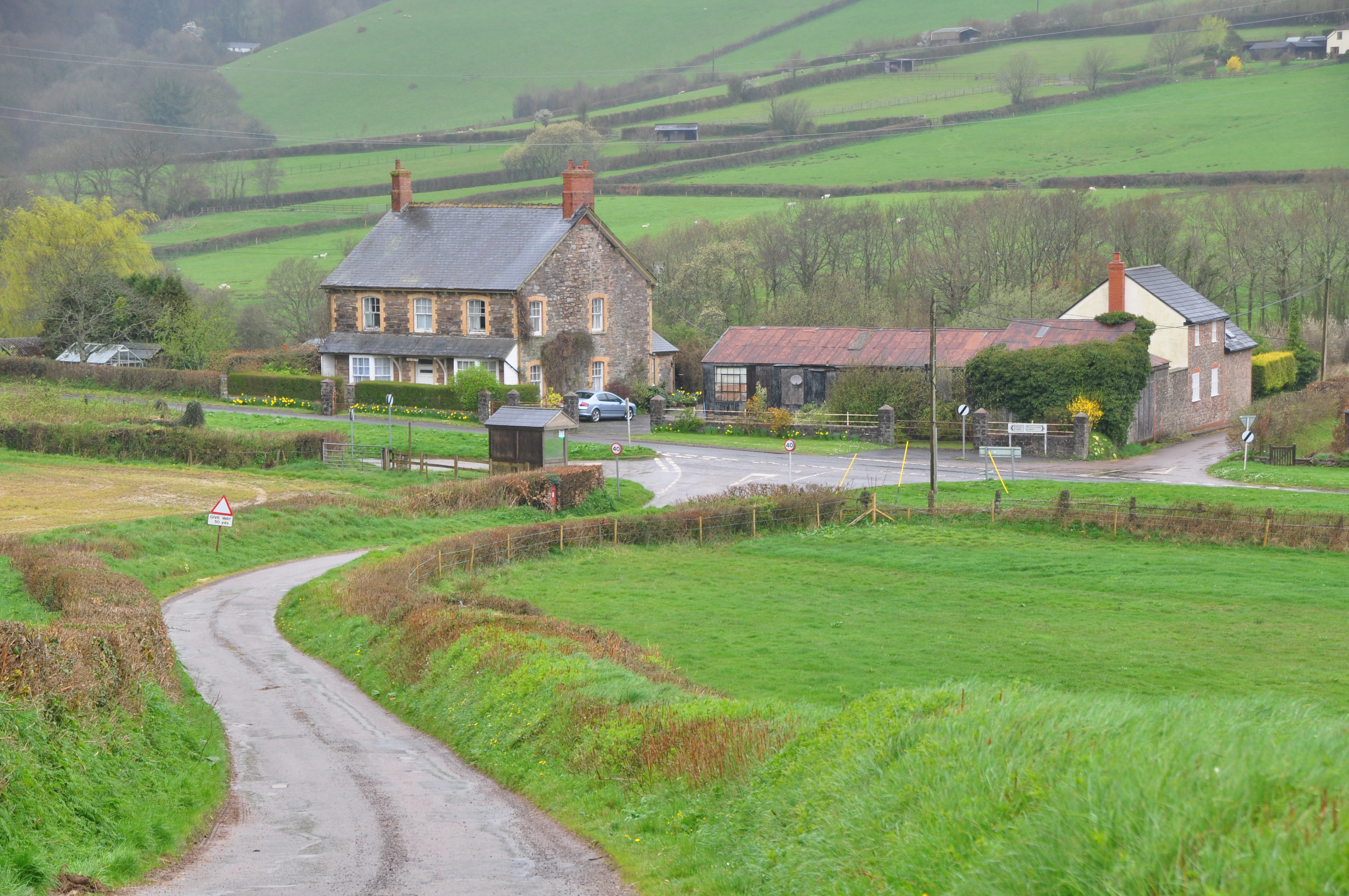
- Petton Cross

- Location within Devon
- Civil parish: Bampton
- District: Mid Devon
- Shire county: Devon
- Region: South West
- Country: England
- Sovereign state: United Kingdom
- Post town: TIVERTON
- Postcode district: EX16
- Dialling code: 01398
- Police: Devon and Cornwall
- Fire: Devon and Somerset
- Ambulance: South Western
- UK Parliament: Tiverton and Minehead

Petton, also known as Petton Cross, is an English village in the civil parish of Bampton, the district of Mid Devon, and the county of Devon. It lies on the B3227 road that links Taunton and Torrington.

The village includes an Anglican church, dedicated to Saint Petrock, and a Methodist church.

The Devon and Somerset Railway, from Taunton to Barnstaple, ran just to the north of the village but no station or halt was ever provided. The line closed in 1966, but traces can still be seen.

== Gallery ==
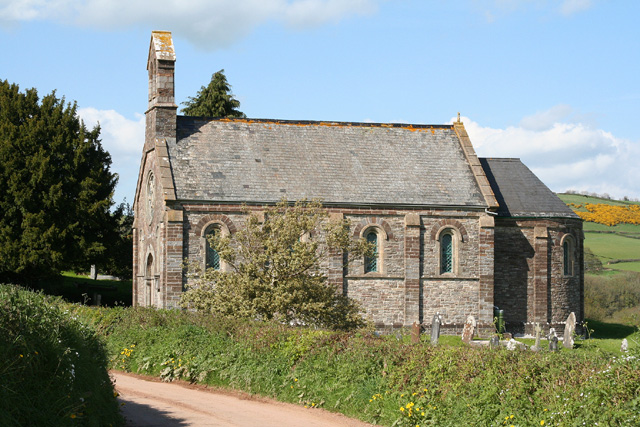
St Petrock's Church

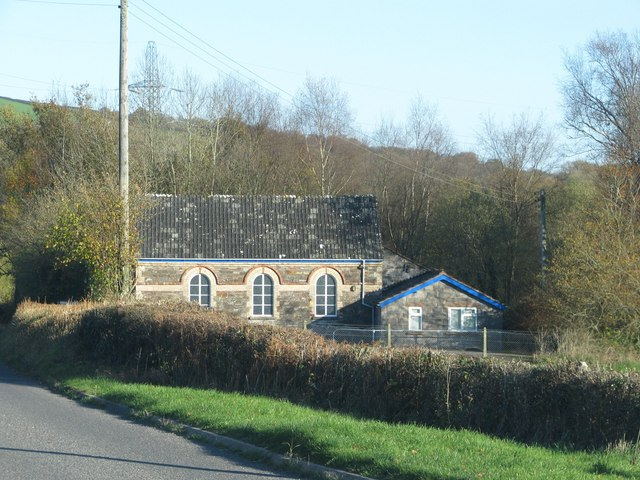
Petton Methodist Church

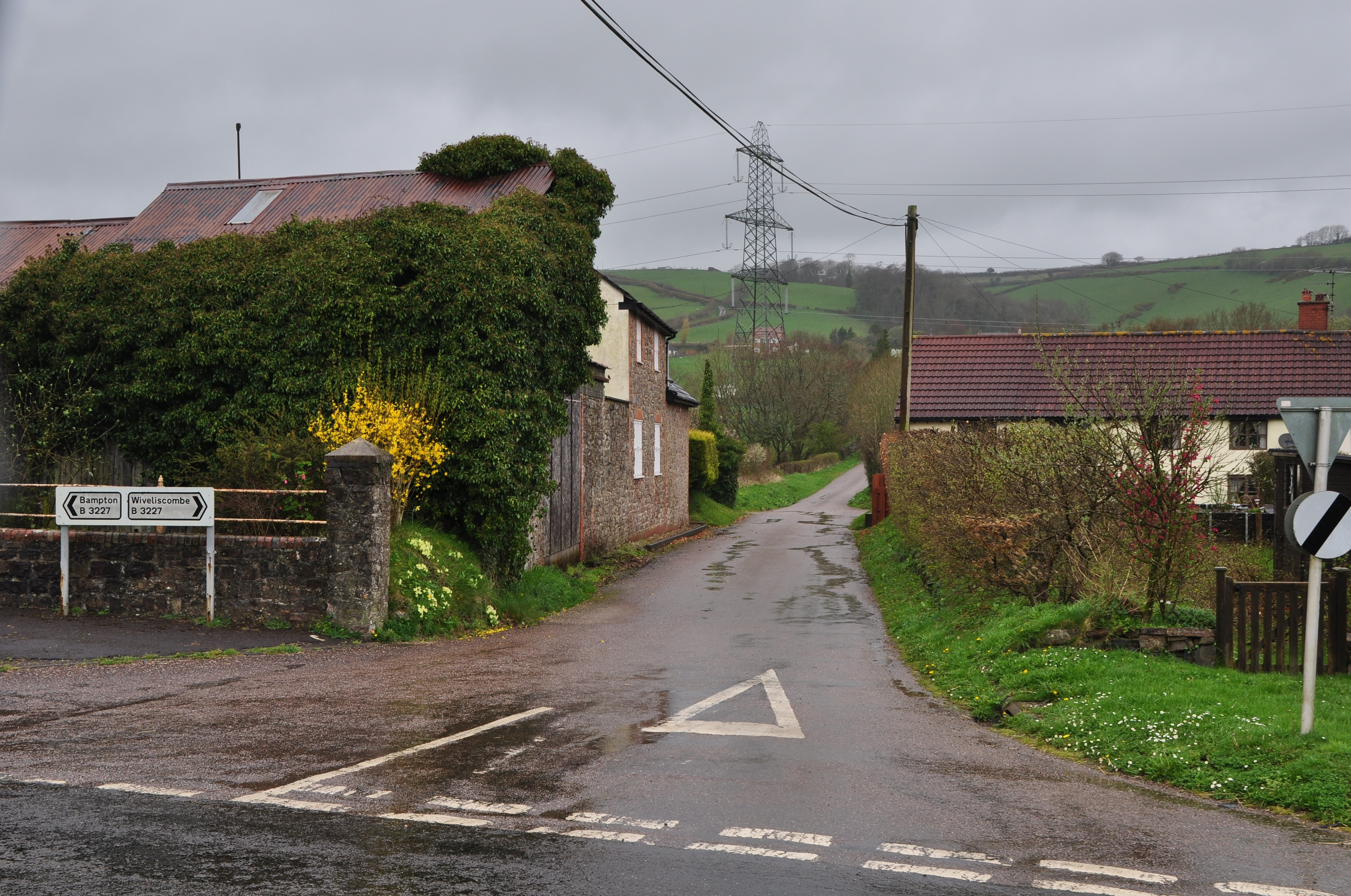
Part of the village

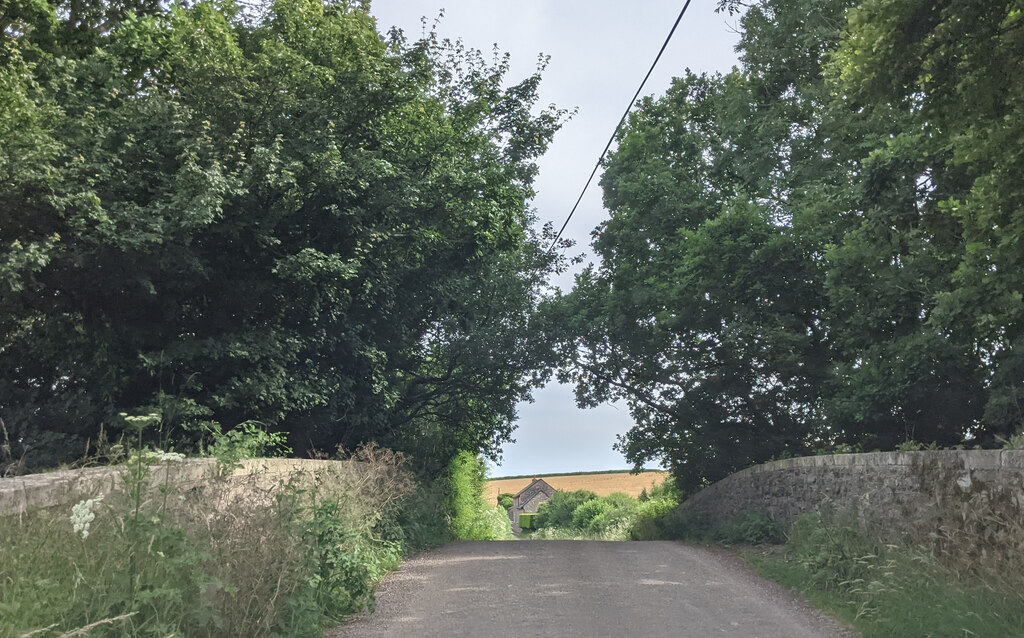
Bridge over abandoned railway
