= Peter Du Val =

Peter Du Val (11 October 1767 – 12 February 1851) was a Canadian ship captain.

He was the son of Jean Du Val and Marie Piton, from Jersey in the Channel Islands, who likely were French Calvinist refugees. In the 1790s, Peter went to work for a Jersey company engaged in the transatlantic trade in cod and other staple commodities. He was a master mariner for the Janvrin brothers firm for more than twenty years.

By 1818 he had left the employ of the Janvrin brothers and set himself up as a merchant under the name 'Peter Du Val and Company' at île Bonaventure, where he had purchased property at the close of the Napoleonic Wars. He and his family were heavily engaged in the maritime fishery and eventually lost the assets to their Jersey investors in the company. They did, however, make an important contribution to the development of that industry.

He was married to Elizabeth Hubert and they had three sons. He died at Ile Bonaventure.
