= William C. Goggin =

American chemist, business manager and business theorist (1911–1988)

William C. Goggin (August 26, 1911 – December 14, 1988) was an American chemist, business manager and business theorist, noted for developing the concept of Multidimensional organization at Dow Corning.

== Biography ==
Born in Alma, Michigan, Goggin obtained his BS in chemistry, Physics and Mathematics at Alma College in 1933, and at the University of Michigan his BS in electrical engineering in 1935 and his MS in electrical engineering in 1936.

Goggin spend his most of his career at Dow Chemical Company, where he started after graduation in 1936 in the Student Training Program. He got further acquainted with the company as Engineer in the Physics Research Laboratory from 1937 to 1939, and as Salesman in the Special Products Division from 1939 to 1941. In 1941 he started in management as Assistant Manager in the Plastics Sales Division, where he became manager in 1942 and manager in the Plastics Development Division in 1943. In 1947 he moved to the Plastics Technical Service, and in 1959 became General Manager of the Plastics Department. In 1967 he moved to the Dow Corning Corporation, where he was President and Director until 1971, and then became its Chairman of the Board until 1976.

In 1954 Goggin was awarded an Honorary D.Sc. from Alma College, and in 1976 he was listed unto the Plastics Hall of Fame.

== Work ==
=== Multidimensional organization ===
As CEO of Dow Corning from 1967 to 1971 Goggin developed a type of organization structure, which became known as the Multidimensional organization. In the 1974 article "How the multidimensional structure works at Dow Corning" in the Harvard Business Review, Goggin described the occasion and motivation of his innovation as follows:

Although Dow Corning was a healthy corporation in 1967, it showed symptoms of difficulty that troubled many of us in top management. These symptoms were, and still are, common ones in U.S. business and have been described countless times in reports, audits, articles, and speeches. Our symptoms took such form as:

1. Executives did not have adequate financial information and control of their operations. Marketing managers, for example, did not know how much it cost to produce a product. Prices and margins were set by the division managers.
2. Cumbersome communications channels existed between key functions, especially manufacturing and marketing.
3. In the face of stiffening competition, the corporation remained too internalized in its thinking and organizational structure. It was insufficiently oriented to the outside world.
4. Lack of communication between divisions not only created the antithesis of a corporate team effort but also was wasteful of a precious resource-people.
5. Long-range corporate planning was sporadic and superficial; this was leading to overstaffing, duplicated effort, and inefficiency.

Fearing that our problems would become worse instead of better in the future, we undertook major changes in our organizational structure. We turned to a matrix concept of organization-what we later came to call the multidimensional organization.

When Goggin had joined Dow Corning, the organization was structured as matrix organization. As main building blocks were seen the profit center and cost center. Goggin explained, that in the concept of the multidimensional organization, two extra dimensions were added:

As we first thought of it, the matrix organization was to be two-dimensional... the different businesses in Dow Corning were seen as:

1. Profit centers. These were the different businesses the company was in. Businesses were defined along product lines-for instance, rubber, encapsulants and sealants; resins and chemicals; fluids, emulsions, and compounds; specialty lubricants; and consumer, medical, and semi-conductor products. In most of the cases each business's product line served a related group of industries, markets, or customers.
2. Cost centers. These were functional activities and included marketing, manufacturing, technical service and development, and research, as well as a number of supportive activities, such as corporate communications, legal and administrative services, economic evaluation, the controller's office, the treasurer's office, and industrial relations.
  But soon we came to see further dimensions of the system:
3. Geographical areas. Business development varied widely horn area to area, and the profit-center and cost-center dimensions could not be carried out everywhere in the same manner...
4. Space and time. A fourth dimension of the organization denotes fluidity and movement through time (see Part D). The multidimensional organization is far from rigid; it is constantly changing. Unlike centralized or decentralized systems that too often are rooted deep in the past, the multidimensional organization is geared toward the future. Long-term planning is an inherent part of its operation.

About Geographical areas Goggin further explained "that each area is considered to be both a profit and a cost center. Dow Coming area organizations are patterned after our major U.S. organization. Although somewhat autonomous in their operation, they subscribe to the overall corporate objectives, operating guidelines, and planning criteria. During the annual planning cycle, for example, there is a mutual exchange of sales, expense, and profit projections between the functional and business managers headquartered in the United States and the area managers around the world."

== Selected publications ==
- De Bell, John M., William C. Goggin, and Walter Ervin Gloor. German plastics practice. Pub. with permission of the Department of Commerce by De Bell and Richardson, 1946.

Articles, a selection:

- Goggin, William C. "How the multidimensional structure works at Dow Corning." in: Harvard Business Review, Jan.-Feb. 1974, pp. 54–65; Reprinted in Hill & White (1979, 152-174)
- Goggin, William C. "Multidimensional Organization Structure: A Decade of Progress." in: Matrix Organization & Project Management. Raymond Hill, Bernard J. White eds. (1979): 179-188.

== Patents ==
- Hanson, Alden W., and William C. Goggin. "Vinylidene chloride copolymer." U.S. Patent No. 2,238,020. 8 Apr. 1941.
- Hanson, Alden W., and William C. Goggin. "Stabilized vinylidene chloride compositions." U.S. Patent No. 2,273,262. 17 Feb. 1942.
