= Multidimensional organization =

Organization that works simultaneously in multiple dimensions

A multidimensional organization is an organization that pursues its objectives simultaneously through multiple dimensions (product, region, account, market segment).

The multidimensional organization was discussed as early as the 1970s. It required the combination of the fall of costs of information, the development of dynamic multidimensional markets, and a new generation of workers and managers, to create this paradigm shift in organization forms.

== Introduction ==
The multidimensional organization exhibits the following:

1. the overall performance of the firm is reported simultaneously on multiple dimensions and on multiple levels;
2. each of these dimensions has a manager who is held accountable for the contribution of his dimension to the overall performance;
3. these managers depend on each other for required resources; and
4. these managers collectively are accountable for the overall performance.

== Defining characteristics ==
- The most important reported profit center in its accounting system is the customer, that is on top of a product or a region, as is common in the unit organization.
- Transaction data is owned by a central corporate office, not by units or regions.
- Information regarding the performance of the firm, especially its position with customers, is available to all managers on the different dimensions (an absence of information asymmetry).
- Contrary to the unit organization, market opportunities and resources are organized under separate responsibilities to avoid risk averse behavior with respect to market opportunities

== Cause ==
The most basic reason for the rise of the multidimensional organization is that due to the fall in costs of information, customers start to behave in multidimensional ways in terms of their preferences, in the ways in which they select and purchase goods and services, make use of distribution channels, etc. To answer this increasing variety in customer behavior, both in private consumers and between businesses, firms need to increase their internal variety.

The multidimensional organization also answers the emergence of multidimensional strategies, in which firms not only pursue market dominance and superior efficiency, but also need to exploit economies of scale.

== Comparison to other organization forms ==
The multidimensional organization is a new organization form, compared to the U-form, the M-form and the H-form. It transcends the restrictions with the M-form or multi-unit organization, as well as the problems with the matrix-organization. Examples of firms with a multidimensional organization are IBM, Microsoft, and ASML.

=== Comparison to matrix organization ===
The differences between the multidimensional organization and the matrix organization can be summarized as below:

Matrix organization	Multidimensional organization
One person may have two bosses, each with their own objectives	Limited number of managers work n-D, most workers within modules in hierarchy; managers having one common challenge, the performance of the firm with customer C
Products and regions are profit center	Customer is the primary profit center
Transaction data is owned by regions	Transaction data is owned by corporate headquarters
No shared performance information	Shared information from trusted sources on performance; no information asymmetry
Transfer prices between dimensions	No transfer of pricing between dimensions
No proper management process for planning & control	Clear management process, giving priority to most critical dimension
Based on economic model of unit organization	Based on economic model of exploiting intangible assets in integrated firm

=== Relating to ERP ===
The multidimensional organization implies specific requirements on how transactions are recorded in enterprise resource planning (ERP) systems, implicating a shift away from the traditional paradigm in IT-governance of business IT-alignment. Now transactions need to be recorded, not only multidimensional, to allow multiple consolidations to occur simultaneously. Particularly, the recording needs to be neutral with respect to business models. ERP systems tend to have a technical lifetime of 10–15 years, whereas business models last for 3–5 years.

== See also ==
- Outline of organizational theory
