= Duvale =

Historic estate in the parish of Bampton, Devon

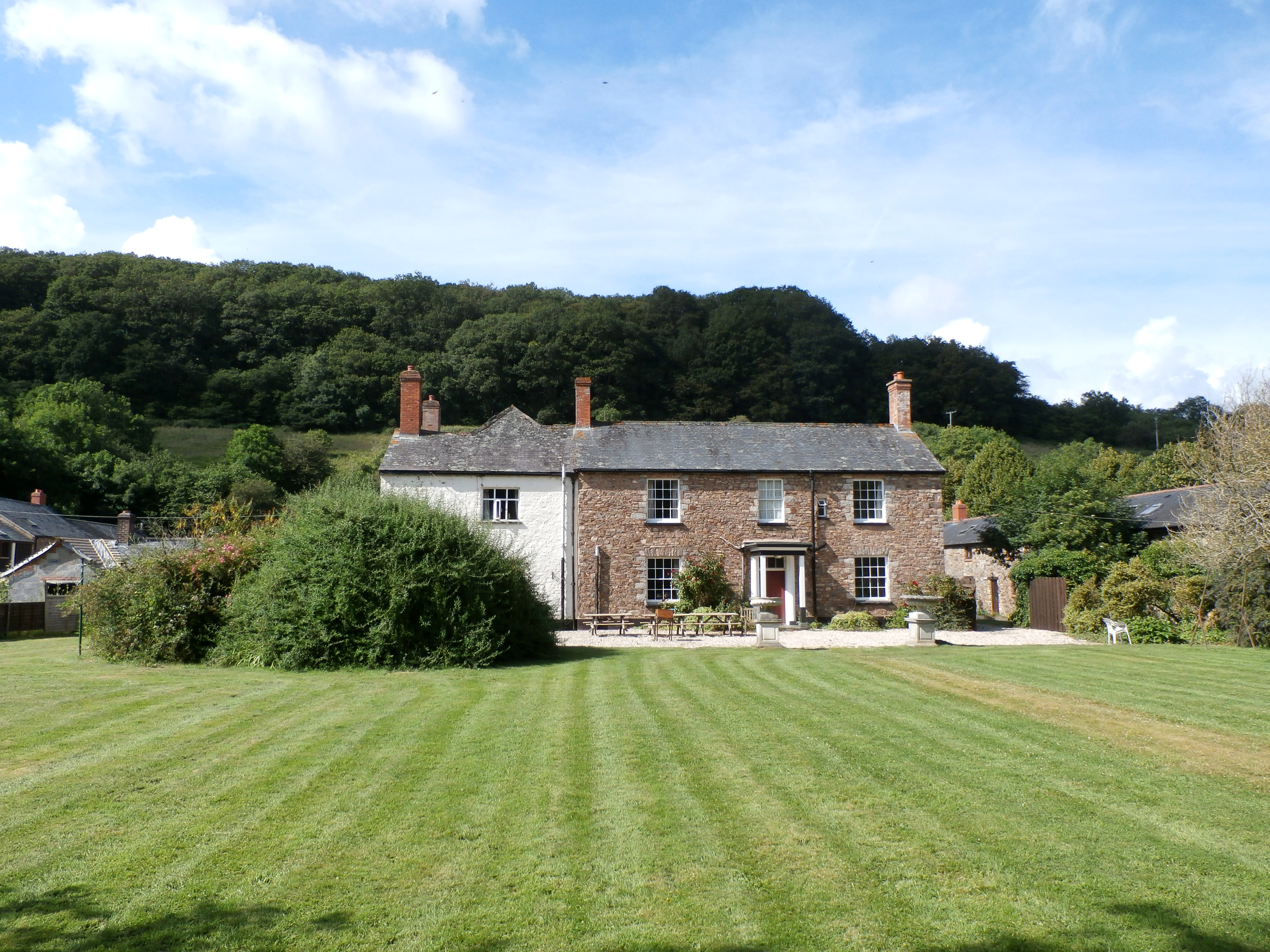
Duvale, viewed from south with River Exe behind viewer

Duvale is a historic estate in the parish of Bampton, Devon. It is situated on a narrow flat plain in the steep-sided valley of the River Exe, 1 1/2 miles south west of the town of Bampton and 5 miles north of Tiverton, also on the River Exe further downstream. The name, given by Pole (d. 1635) as Deu Vale, is said by him to signify "a valley of water". It was until the nearby construction of the present busy A396 road a place of exceptional seclusion and tranquility.

== Mediaeval era ==
According to the Book of Fees Duvale was one of the member manors of the feudal barony of Bampton, together with Hele(possibly Hele, Clayhanger, Doddiscombe, Hockworthy, Havekareland (possibly Hawkerland, Colaton Raleigh) Legh (Lea Barton, Hockworthy)

== Dennis ==
Duvale was held by a branch of the ancient Dennis family of Orleigh. Pole states Deu Vale to have been held in 1242 by "Robert le Dennys".

== Cruwys ==
After the Dennis family, Duvale was held by a branch of the ancient Cruwys family of Cruwys Morchard. Pole states Deu Vale to have been the dwelling in 1295 of "John Crewes".

== Tristram ==
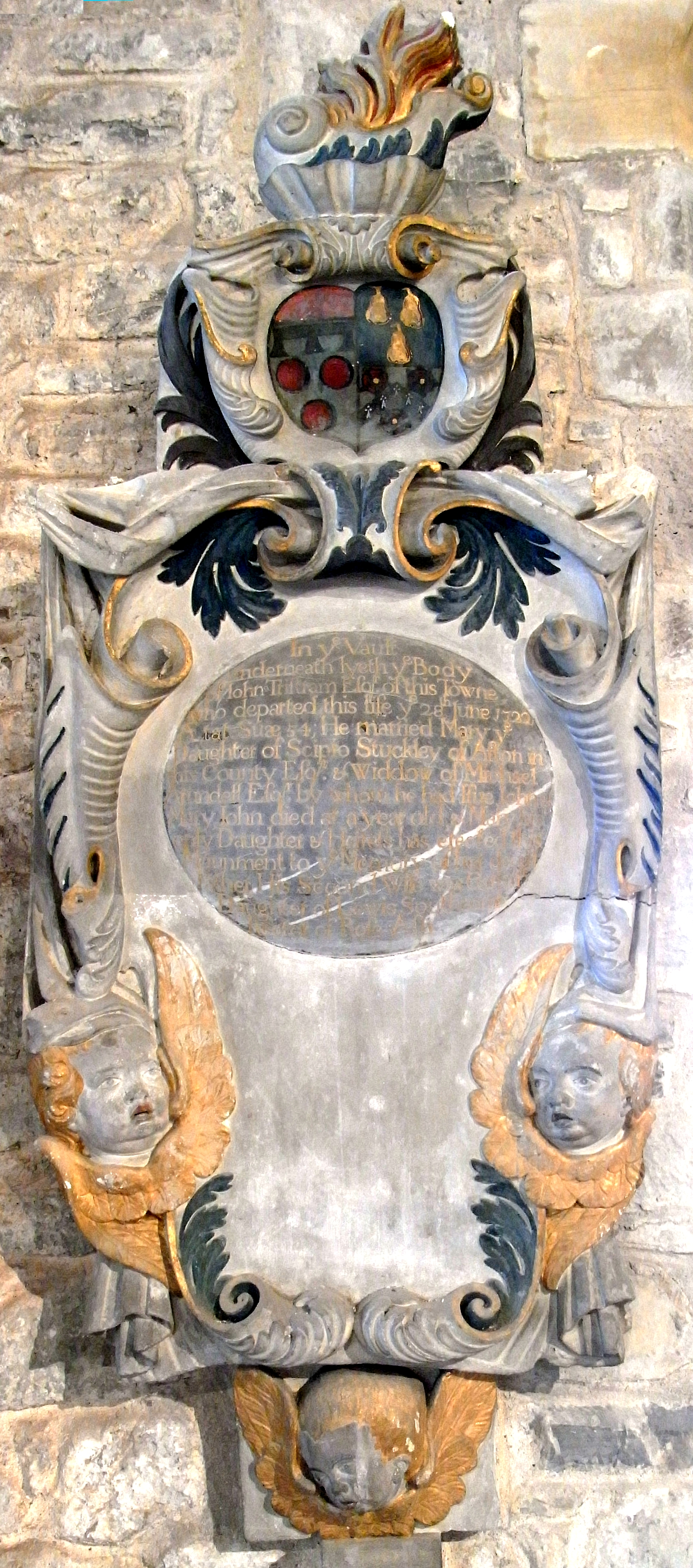
Mural monument to John Tristram (1668–1722), Bampton parish church

During the reign of Queen Elizabeth I (1558–1603) Duvale was purchased from the heir general of the Cruwys family by Thomas Tristram. Writing in about 1630 Pole stated of the first Tristram of Duvale "whose posterity contynewe theire dwellinge in the same place". An old mansion near Bampton Castle, called Castle Grove, was another nearby residence of the Tristram family, who according to Lysons (1822) probably purchased it from the Bourchiers, feudal barons of Bampton. In 1822 the site of Bampton Castle was the property of Robert Lucas, heir to the Tristram family. A mural monument to John Tristram (1668–1722) exists in Bampton parish church, inscribed as follows:

"In ye vault underneath lyeth ye body of John Tristram Esqr. of this Towne who departed this life ye 28th June 1722 aetat(is) suae 54. He married Mary ye daughter of Scipio Stuckley of Afeton in this county, Esqr., & widdow of Michael Arundell, Esqr., by whom he had issue John & Mary. John died at a year old & Mary his only daughter & heiress has erected this monument to ye memory of her dece'd father. His second wife was Gartrude daughter of Lewis Southcomb of Rose Ash"

On the escutcheon above are shown the arms of Tristram (Argent, three torteaux a label of three points azure a chief gules) impaling Stucley (Azure, three pears or) and Southcombe (Argent, a chevron ermines between three roses gules seeded or barbed vert

== Newte ==
After the Tristram family, in 1796 Duvale was the joint property of the East India Company Captain Thomas Newte, author of Prospects and Observations on a Tour in England and Scotland, Natural, Oeconomical, and Literary (1791), (a reworking and enlargement of A Tour in England and Scotland by an English Gentleman (1789) by William Thomson (1746–1817)), and the widow of his brother Rev. Mr. Newte, a classical scholar and poet. Thomas Newte married Anna Maria Raymond, one of the three daughters of the wealthy East India Company ship owner and banker Sir Charles Raymond, 1st Baronet (1713–1788), of Valentines, Ilford in Essex. Anna Maria predeceased her father leaving her married sisters the co-heiresses to Raymond's vast fortune. Raymond was himself born in Withycombe Raleigh, Devon.

The Newte family had long been prominent in the area. Henry Newte The Elder was Town Clerk of Tiverton. Newte's son Henry NewteThe Younger (1609–1670), also served as Town Clerk of the town from 1625 to 1655 and was also twice its Mayor, and in 1660 the MP for Tiverton.

John Newte (1656–1716), a Church of England clergyman was, for a period, appointed chaplain to King Charles II. However, Charles II converted to Catholicism on his deathbed in 1685. Newte was educated at Blundell's School in Tiverton and became Rector of Tidcombe and Pitt portions (or quarters), Tiverton. He donated money for the building of Cove Chapel (near Duvale), founded Charity Schools in Tiverton and bequeathed land in Braunton to Balliol College, Oxford to found an exhibition for a Blundell's scholar. Several monumental inscriptions to Newte family members survive in Tiverton parish church, including:

- Henry Newte (1670);
- Richard Newte (1678), Rector of Tidcombe and Clare quarters in Tiverton, which were in the patronage of his family.
- Rev. John Newte (1715);
- Samuel Newte (1781), Rector of Tidcombe Quarter, Tiverton;
- Rev John Newte (1792).

=== 1796 visit by Swete ===
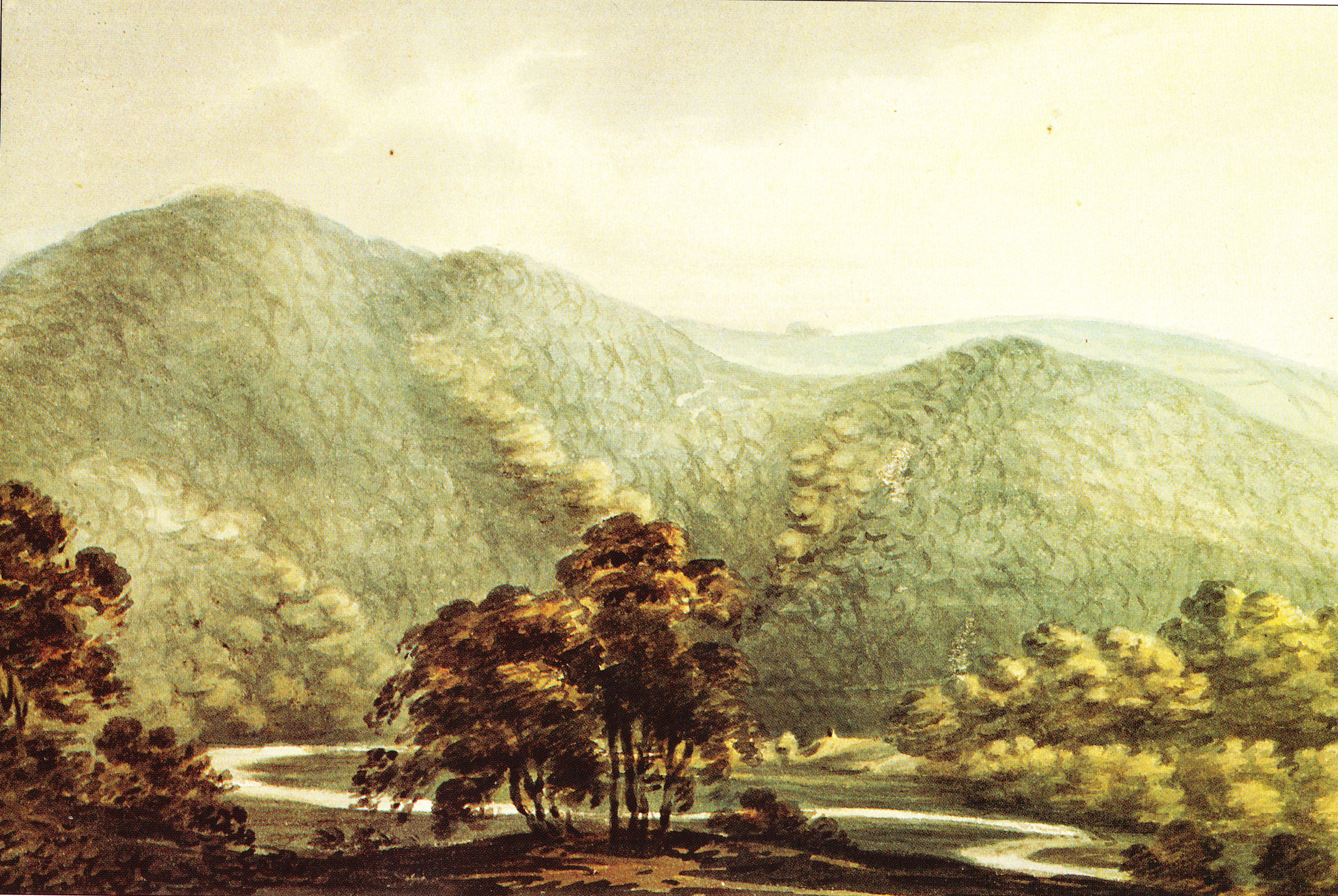
"View from an eminence at Duvale", 1796 watercolour by Rev. John Swete (d. 1821) of River Exe valley at Duvale. Devon Record Office 564M/F10/23

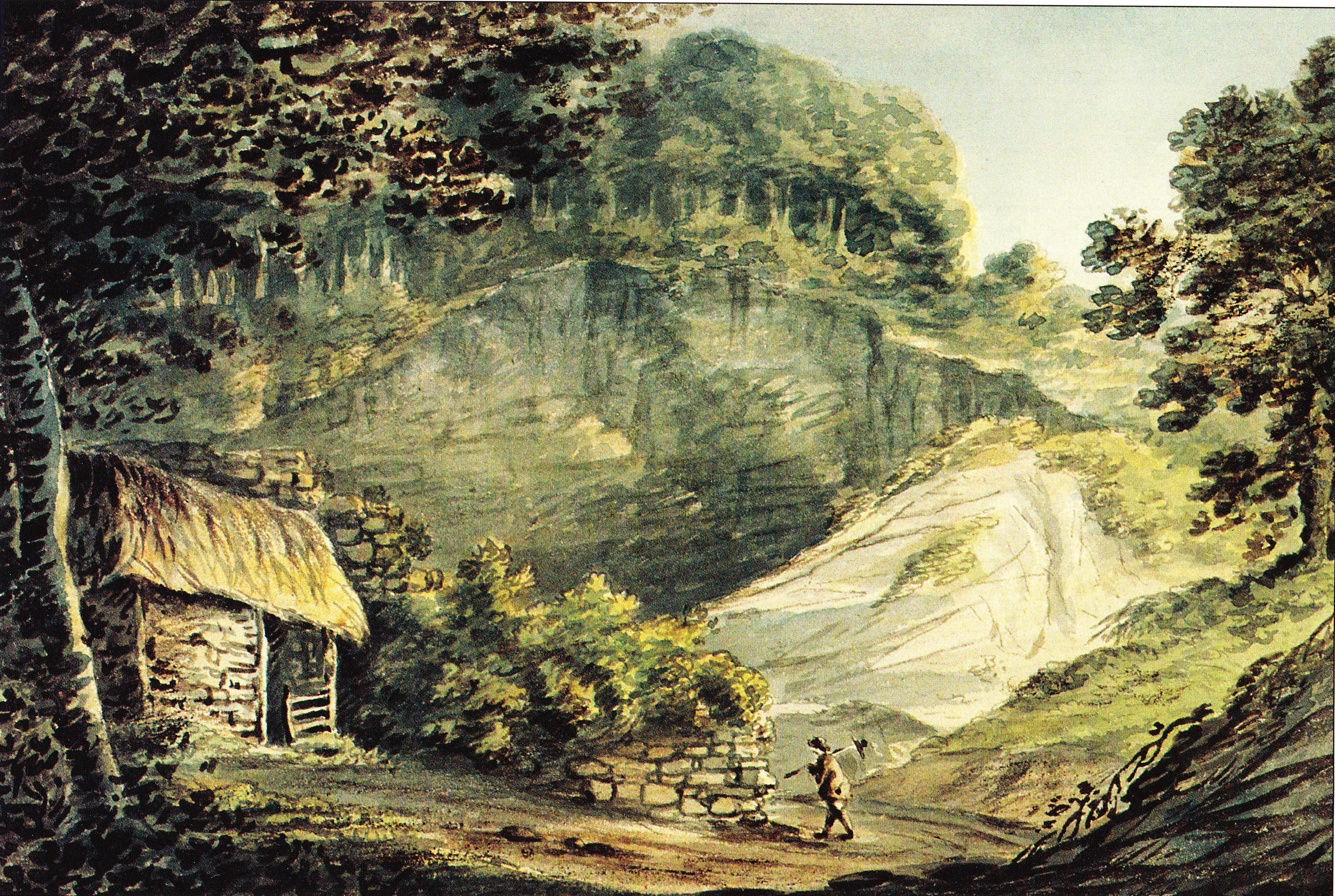
"Quarry at Duvale", 1796 watercolour by Rev. John Swete (d. 1821). Devon Record Office 564M/F10/27

In the summer of 1796 Rev John Swete (1752–1821) visited Duvale as part of his topographical tour of Devon. Although he described the house itself as "of antient date without any conspicuous marks of consequence", he was highly impressed by the natural scenery of the location. He approached from Tiverton, via Cove, where he crossed the River Exe by the newly built Cove Bridge, and proceeded across Duvale Ford to Bampton. He described seeing "Duvale House", and described the surrounding scenery as:

"A valley of pastures inclosed between two hills of wood of great height and which extending to Duvale House, stretched itself further down the bottom till having wound round a promontory it at length reached the hamlet and bridge of Cove which I had before past. This valley was nearly the same width, not a quarter of a mile throughout, which the River Exe, an general rapid and in a foam as if exercita cursu", flowed on contributing to heighten a scenery which was in itself unusually romantic... From the ford I past down the narrow straith winding at the base of immense hills, the vastness of whose elevation I could well now distinguish, which on the western side that I had left, making a circuitous range, occasion the quick meanderings of the river which in a great degree surrounds Duvale...Nothing can well exceed the retirement of this spot: to persons of meditative minds and admirers of the grand features of Nature it would appear a little Elyzium. It would exactly suit those who "The world forgetting by the world forgot". From Duvale ascending a hill I came to an high eminence looking down the river, from hence the view of the valley and its surrounding hills (an idea of which may be conceived from the preceding sketch) was of the most romantic nature".

== Fazakerly ==
After the Newte tenure, in 1822 Duvale belonged to John Nicholas Fazakerley (1787–1852), MP for Lincoln (1812–18), Great Grimsby (1818–20), Tavistock (1820), Lincoln again (1826–30) and City of Peterborough (1830–41).

== Yandle ==
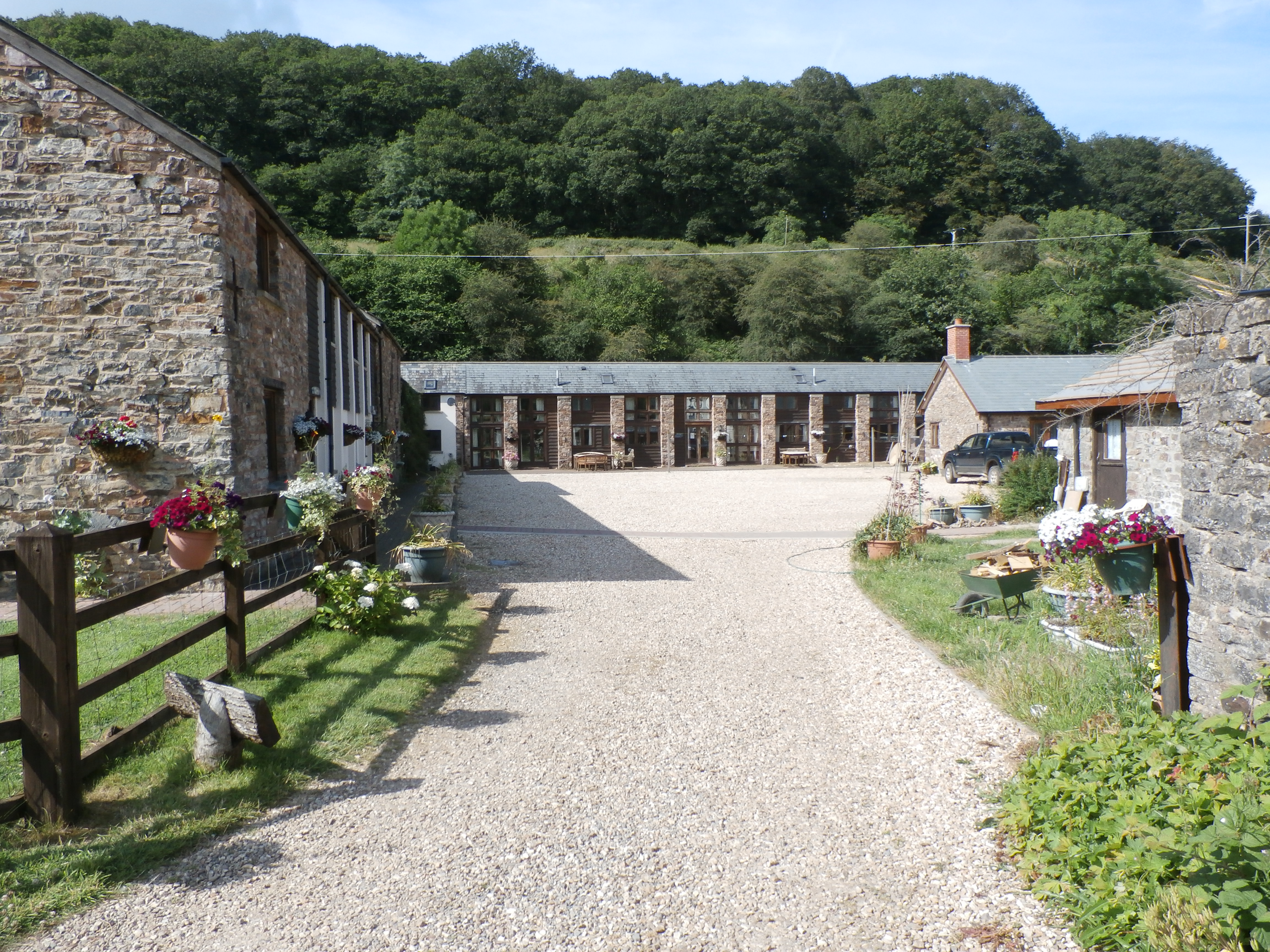
Expansive farmyard at Duvale, now converted into residential accommodation. Part served as kennels for the Tiverton Staghounds. In the centre a wide linhay

In 1880 Duvale was let to Thomas I Yandle, a farmer previously the tenant of Hele Bridge, a farm on the Pixton Estate in Dulverton, who had fallen out with his landlord. The Yandle family in 2014 is still prominent in the Devon and Somerset stag-hunting community. Thomas I had 3 daughters (including Clare, Kate and Amy (died aged 108 in about 1991), all of whom remained unmarried and kept house for various of their brothers and parents) and 5 sons who grew up at Duvale: Jack, the eldest, Dave, Perce, Ernest (born 1800) and Thomas II, who died of TB aged 14. He acquired tenancies of several further local farms, to one of which, Riphay Barton at Exebridge he himself moved in 1901, and established three of his sons as farmers: Jack at Chevithorn Barton, part of the Amory family's estate at Knightshayes Court, and two brothers at Duvale. All the sons had been destined for farming, but Ernest Yandle (born 1880), the second youngest, considered of delicate health, at the age of 14 or 15 was sent away to Tiverton to learn the trade of draper which he continued at Exeter and Bristol until 1910, when he returned to Devon to farm and hunt. In 1918 Thomas I retired from farming, and Ernest took over the tenancy at Riphay, while Jack remained at Chevithorne and Dave and Perce in partnership at Duvale. Shortly before 1931 Percy Yandle purchased the freehold of Duvale, just before his brother Ernest purchased the freehold of Riphay, from the Pixton Estate of Henry Herbert, 6th Earl of Carnarvon (1898–1987). Percy Yandle lived with one of his unmarried sisters who kept house for him at Duvale. Duvale was sold by the Yandles in the 1960s

In 1919 the 4 Yandle brothers took on mastership of the recently formed Tiverton Staghounds, and built kennels at Duvale. They retained the mastership until 1945. The Tiverton Staghounds was established to control red deer numbers around that locality, which had previously been the responsibility of the long-established Devon and Somerset Staghounds, which found itself with too large a country to cope with effectively. Ernest's son is Tom Yandle (born 1935) of Riphay, chairman of the Devon and Somerset Staghounds, High Sheriff of Somerset and a committee member of both the National Trust and Exmoor National Park, who played a leading role in challenging the Labour government's ultimately successful proposal to ban hunting with hounds.

== 21st century ==
Since 1991 the property has been renamed "Duvale Priory" and has been operated by Mark Underhill as a holiday letting business, and more recently as a licensed functions venue. The premises with converted former farm buildings and kennels has sleeping accommodation for a total of 93 persons (Duvale Priory (sleeps 22), Orchard Barn (sleeps 26), Duvale Barn (sleeps 33), Duvale Retreat (sleeps 12))

== Sources ==
- Pole, Sir William (d. 1635), Collections Towards a Description of the County of Devon, Sir John-William de la Pole (ed.), London, 1791, p. 210, Deu Vale
- Vivian, Lt.Col. J.L., (Ed.) The Visitations of the County of Devon: Comprising the Heralds' Visitations of 1531, 1564 & 1620, Exeter, 1895, p. 737, pedigree of Tristram of Bampton
- Risdon, Tristram (d. 1640), Survey of Devon, 1811 edition, London, 1811, with 1810 Additions
- Gray, Todd & Rowe, Margery (Eds.), Travels in Georgian Devon: The Illustrated Journals of The Reverend John Swete, 1789–1800, 4 vols., Tiverton, 1999
- Lysons, Samuel & Daniel, Magna Britannia, Vol.6: Devon, London, 1822
