= Mitchell Goggins =

South Carolina state legislator

Mitchell Goggins (1850 - ?) was a state legislator in South Carolina. He represented Abbeville County, South Carolina in the South Carolina House of Representatives from 1870 to 1872 and 1874 to 1876.

Columbus Goggins was his father.

== See also ==
- African American officeholders from the end of the Civil War until before 1900
