= Peter Goggin =

Australian cricketer (born 1965)

Personal information
- Born: 30 October 1965 (age 61); Roma, Queensland, Australia
- Source: Cricinfo, 3 October 2020

Peter Goggin (born 30 October 1965) is an Australian cricketer. He played in twenty-one first-class and seven List A matches for Queensland between 1990 and 1993.

== See also ==
- List of Queensland first-class cricketers
