= Gerard Goggin =

Australian academic

Gerard Michael Goggin
- Born: Australia

Academic background
- Influences: Christoper Newell

Academic work
- Era: Current
- School or tradition: Media and Communications
- Main interests: Internet, mobile phones, telecommunications and disability
- Notable works: Disability and Media, Mobile Phones and Media
- Influenced: Haiqing Yu, Katie Wiltshire, Sheenal Singh, Kirsten Wade, Kate Evans.

Professor Gerard Goggin FAHA is an Australian media and communications researcher at the University of Sydney. He has produced award-winning research in disability and media policy alongside other contemporary works on digital technology and cultures.

Goggin has been described as a “central scholar in the mobile communication research community”. He is researching internet histories in Australia and the Asia-Pacific and the implications of audio-visual media for government policy.

== Biography ==
Goggin graduated from the University of Melbourne with a Bachelor of Arts (Honours) in 1986, with studies in English literature and Indonesian. He received his PhD in literature from the University of Sydney for his thesis titled Turbulent Preceptors: Mentoring, Maternity and Masculinity in Wollstonecraft, William Godwin and Percy Bysshe Shelley.

In the early 1990s, Goggin was policy advisor at Consumers Telecommunications before serving as deputy chair and public member of the Telephone Information Service Standards Council from 2002 to 2008. Goggin was a founding board member of the Australian Communications Consumer Action Network, which was established in 2009. He is a member of the Australian e-Research Infrastructure Council (AeRIC).

Goggin has held several academic appointments, including at Southern Cross University in Lismore, University of Queensland and University of Sydney. Goggin was a visiting professor at the Centre d’Estudis Australians at the University of Barcelona in 2007. Goggin was then professor of digital communication and deputy-director of the Journalism and Media Research Centre at the University of New South Wales (UNSW).

Goggin was Australian Research Council Future Fellow from 2014-2018, University of Sydney Chair of Department in Media and Communications at the University of Sydney, and in 2018 Head of that University's School of Literature Art and Media. In November 2017 he was elected a fellow of the Australian Academy of the Humanities.

In 2019 Goggin was appointed Wee Kim Wee Professor of Communication Studies, WKWSCI, NTU.

== Research history ==
In his research Goggin focuses on the Internet, mobile phones, telecommunication and disability research. He was a professor of digital communication, and deputy director of the Journalism and Media Research Centre at the University of New South Wales in Sydney, Australia until early 2011.

Goggin has published prolifically, authoring several books and book chapters, and edited some books as well. He was editor of Media International Australia, a media studies journal. Prior to working at the University of NSW in Sydney, Goggin was associated with the University of Sydney, University of Queensland, Southern Cross University, and the University of Barcelona.

One of Goggin's areas of research deals directly with the cultural and social aspects of mobile phones and media. His most recent published research in this area includes the project entitled Mobile Culture: A Biography of the Mobile Phone. This study was done over the course of four years ending in 2008 and was funded by Australian Research Fellowship grants. Goggin and Kate Crawford are working on another project through ARC funding entitled Young, Mobile, Networked: Mobile Media and Youth Culture in Australia. Another area of his research is in disability also correlating with media. Goggin worked with the late Christopher Newell to author many papers and books in this area. Most notably, their book Disability in Australia: Exposing a Social Apartheid, was awarded the Human Rights and Equal Opportunity Commission Arts Non-Fiction prize. His last area of research interest deals with Internet Cultures and Histories. He is doing a comparative study of Australia, Japan, South Korea, and China and their Internet history. This research project is also funded by the Australian Research Fellowship and is collaboration with Mark McLelland, Haiqing Yu, and Kwangsuk Lee.

Goggin's background goes beyond education and academics as he is involved in the community as well. He was a founding board member of the new Australian Communications Consumer Action Network, Deputy Chair and public member of the Telephone Information Service Standards Council.

Goggin has lectured at workshops, including the Communication and Media Studies Program at Murdoch University in 2010, Internet Research 8.0 Learning and Research in the Second Life Workshop, Internet Histories 2: Australia and the Asia-Pacific in 2008, The Role of New Technologies in Global Societies in 2008.

== Works ==
(Chronologically)

- Virtual Nation: The Internet in Australia (2004)
- Disability in Australia: Exposing a Social Apartheid (with Christopher Newell, 2005)
- Cell Phone Culture (2006)
- Mobile Media ( ed with Hjorth, 2007)
- 'Mobile Phone Cultures' (2008)
- Mobile Technologies: From Telecommunications to Media (edited with Hjorth 2009)
- 'Global Internets: Media Research in the New World'. In Handbook of Global Media Research (ed Nightingale, 2010)
- 'Going Mobile'. In Handbook of Media Audiences (ed Nightingale, 2010)
- 'Laughing with/at the disabled': The cultural politics of disability in Australian universities'. Discourse: Studies in the Cultural Politics of Education (2010)
- 'Moveable Types: The Emergence of Mobile Social Media in Australia'. Media Asia Journal (2010)
- 'The Intimate Turn of News: Mobile News.' In News Online: Transformation and Continuity (ed Meikle, 2010)
- 'Disability, Mobiles and Social Policy: New Modes of Communication and Governance'. In Mobile Communications: New Dimensions of Social Policy (Katz et al., 2011)
- 'Disability Connections: Technologies, Politics, Prospects'. In The Unconnected: Social Justice, Participation and Engagement in the Information Society (Baker et al. 2011)
- 'Mobiles, Men and Migration: Mobile Communication and Everyday Multiculturalism in Australia'. In Migrations, Diaspora and Information Technology in Global Societies (ed Fortunati, 2011)
- Global Mobile Media (2011)
- New Technologies and the Media (2011)
- 'Reading (with) the iPhone'. In Moving Data: The iPhone and My Media (Snickars et al., 2011)
- 'Telephone Media: An Old Story'. In The Long History of New Media: Technology, Historiography, and Newness in Context (ed Park, 2011)
- Mobile technology and place (2013)
- Disability and the Media (2015)
- Routledge Companion to Global Internet Histories (2017)
- 'Digital Technology and Rights in the Lives of Children with Disabilities.' New Media & Society 1 (2017)
- 'Disability and Haptic Mobile Media.' In New Media & Society 19 (2017)
- Disability and Listening (2018)
- 'Media and Communications.' In Rethinking Society for the 21st Century: Report of the International Panel on Social Progress, edited by International Panel on Social Progress (IPSP), Vol. 2. (2018)
- Location Technologies in International Context. (2019)
- 'Digital Rights in Asia: Rethinking Regional and International Agenda.' In Digital Transactions in Asia: Economic, Informational, and Social Exchanges (ed Athique and Baulch 2019)
- 'Disability, Connected Cars, and Communication.' In International Journal of Communication 13 (2019)
- 'Disability, Technology Innovation and Social Development in China and Australia.' In Journal of Asian Public Policy 12 (2019)
- Location Technologies in International Context (2020)
- Routledge Companion to Disability and Media (2020)
- 'Mobile Paradoxes: European Emergence of Mobile Internet, Users, and Markets'. Internet Histories 4 (2020)

See his UNSW and USyd pages for more extensive list of publications.

=== Disability in Australia: Exposing a Social Apartheid ===
Goggin wrote and published a seminal book, Disability in Australia: Exposing a Social Apartheid, with the late bioethicist Christopher Newell in 2005. Adopting a critical disability studies approach coupled with insights from cultural and media studies, Goggin and Newell carefully trace and diagnose the "social apartheid" of disability in Australia. Their central argument is that disability in Australia has been 'reinstitutionalised'. Looking at an assemblage of texts, institutions, social and cultural practices mobilised around health and welfare, sport, biotechnology, genetics, politics and migration; they establish the way power has manifested to exclude and marginalise people with disabilities. They argue that these unequal power relations constitute an "unrelenting system of exclusion and otherness of disability in Australia" that has become "interiorised".

Disability, they argue, is inscribed in opposition to the norm of being 'able-bodied' as a result of which persons with disabilities are defined as abnormal, even sub-citizens. These constructions drive the production and reproduction of social and cultural policies that view people with disabilities as forms of economic costs and community burdens. Taking an explicit human rights stance, Goggin and Newell argue that a commitment to greater autonomy and inclusion for people with disabilities is crucial for Australian society.

Nikki Wedgwood and Gwynnyth Lllewellyn herald the book as a much-need contribution to disability studies which has too long been dominated by "medical paradigms". The book was awarded the Human Rights and Equal Opportunity Commission's non-fiction prize in 2005.

=== Global Mobile Media ===
Reflecting on his work on mobile phone technology and culture, Goggin stated that he was "intrigued by the whole phenomenon of mobile phones".

In Global Mobile Media, Goggin rethinks cell phones as a form of global media and argues that global mobile media could be "a fertile garden for culture". Taking a cultural political economic approach, he offers a critical and multidimensional map of the corporate, institutional and economic dynamics that shape mobile media as well as its cultural uses, implications and challenges. Debates and scholarship mobilised around digital cultures tend to "annex" discussions about cell phones to wider discussions about the Internet – but considering the interplay between the two, Goggin argues that mobile media warrant grounded analysis.

Following rich discussions about mobile television, video, music and gaming, he uses the iPhone as one case study to tease out the politics of mobile media to argue that, contrary to rapture myths, this cell phone "shares more with previous cell phones than Apple concedes". He argues that the iPhone is a kind of cultural adaptation – it adapts the cell phone for the internet and puts it "at the centre of computing, the internet and digital culture". Considering the politics of Apple products where technologies and intellectual property are carefully controlled, Goggin finds that the iPhone is similarly entangled in policies and practices that "circumscribe and manage" how users consume and adapt this technology. A strange economy of consumption and use emerges here. Although these regimes police the boundaries of adaptation, hacking tools have allowed iPhones to be modified at "warp-speed". On the other hand, despite this kind of user activism, the iPhone also continues to perpetuate the "disabling power relations of technology" – it remains largely inaccessible for blind users and its politics of "touch" means it can exclude those with physical disabilities.

Rowan Wilken points out that the book primarily restricts its treatment of the 'global' to advanced economies notwithstanding the "restricted discussion of mobile internet use in the global South".
