= Bampton, Devon =

Town in Devon, England

Coordinates: 50.98974°N 3.48601°W

Bampton
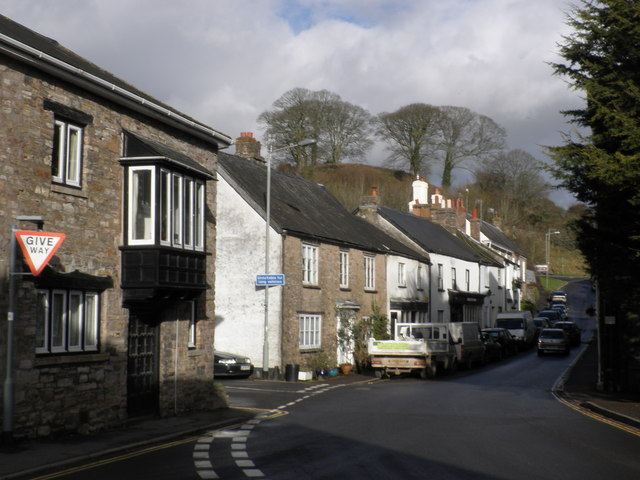
- Castle Street, Bampton

- Location within Devon
- Population: 1,260 (2011 UK Census)
- OS grid reference: SS957222
- District: Mid Devon
- Shire county: Devon
- Region: South West
- Country: England
- Sovereign state: United Kingdom
- Post town: TIVERTON
- Postcode district: EX16
- Dialling code: 01398
- Police: Devon and Cornwall
- Fire: Devon and Somerset
- Ambulance: South Western
- UK Parliament: Tiverton and Minehead

Bampton is a small town and parish in northeast Devon, England, on the River Batherm, a tributary of the River Exe. It is about 6 miles (9.7 km) north of Tiverton, 19 miles (31 km) north of Exeter and the parish borders Somerset on its north-east and north-west sides. Bampton is a major part of the electoral ward of Clare and Shuttern. The ward population at the 2011 Census was 3,412.

== History ==
=== Toponymy ===
The name Bampton is derived from the Old English bæðhǣmetūn meaning 'settlement of the bath dwellers', either referring to baths for bathing, or perhaps to nearby Morebath.

=== Pre-Norman ===
The history of Bampton is thought to have started with a Roman fort, but later Saxon remains are most easily seen. Some hedges conform to the Saxon furrow measure of 625 feet (the later furlong) and traces of Saxon strip farming can be seen to the north-east of the later castle. The circular churchyard is also Saxon in origin.

=== Norman ===
The 11th-century Norman Bampton Castle was built in about 1067 by Walter Douai or his son, Robert. Originally it probably had a timber tower on top of the Motte. To the east of the mound was a rectangular bailey, defended to the south by the steep slope down to the River Batherm. Following a dispute with King Stephen about the ownership of lands around Uffculme, Robert Douai rebelled against King Stephen. Stephen then besieged the castle which eventually surrendered. Robert’s fled into exile and his lands were granted to Henry de Tracy.

=== Civil War ===
The English Civil War reached Bampton in 1645, when Royalists from Tiverton Castle burnt the town, so that few buildings earlier than the 17th century survive.

=== Nineteenth century ===
The population in the 1841 census was 1,275 inhabitants.

== Landmarks ==
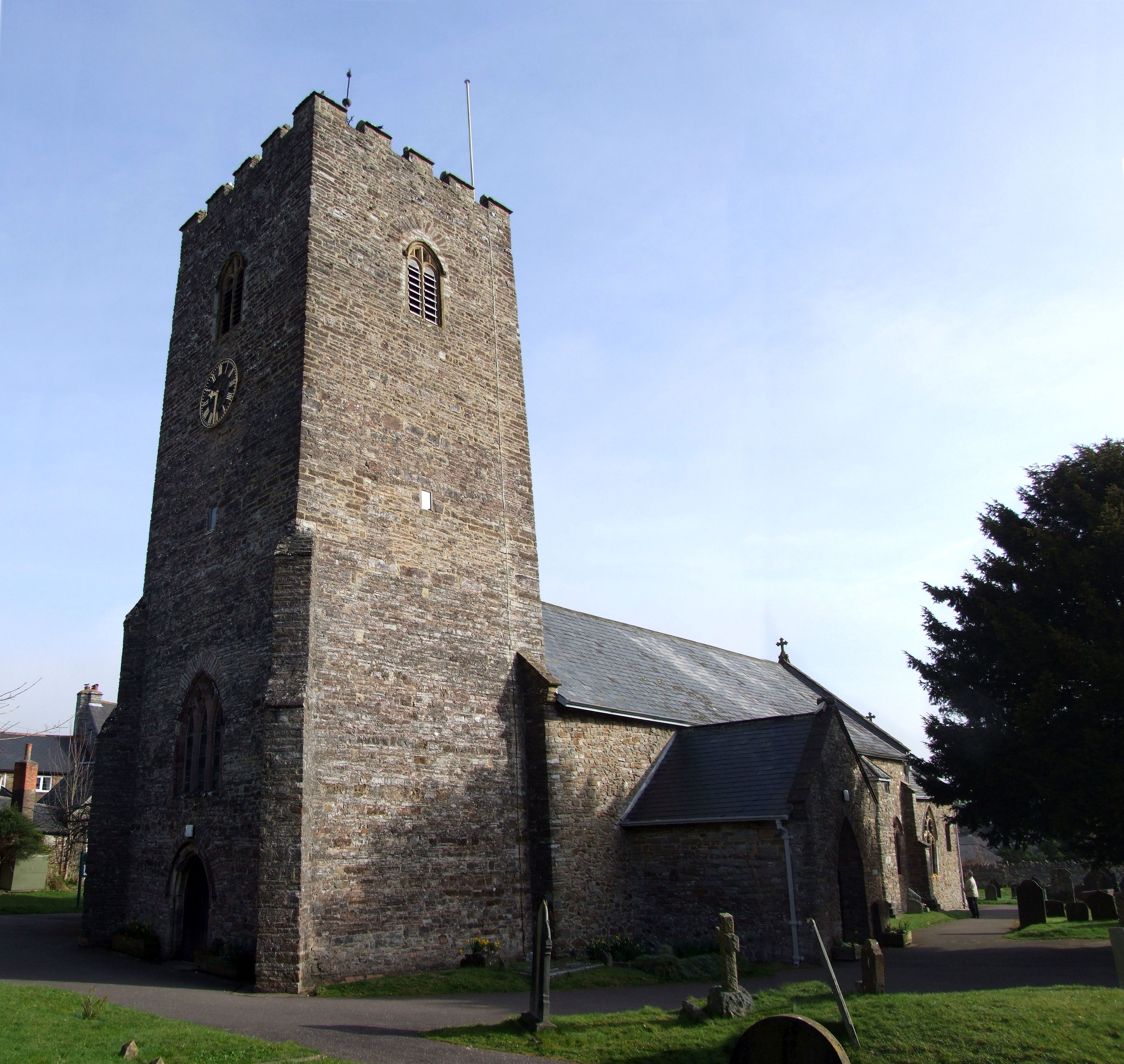
Church of St Michael and All Angels

Bampton now has over 70 listed buildings including the Grade I listed church, dedicated to Saint Michael and All Angels, whose tower dates from the 13th century. It was rebuilt and enlarged in the fifteenth century and restored in 1872. In the hamlet of Petton, which is in the parish, is the small church of Saint Petrock. Parts of the former vicarage date from the middle of the 15th century; and the Exeter Inn on the edge of the town was originally a farmhouse built in 1495.

== Bampton Fair ==
=== History ===
The annual Bampton Fair was established by Royal Charter in 1258 and is held every year on the last Thursday in October. Although a fair was mentioned in 1212 and is possibly even older. The first surviving charter for a fair to be held at the church of Saint Luke is from 1258 and was granted by Henry III to the rector of the church, Master Osmund. Later fairholders included the Coggan, Fitz Warine, Courtney and Bourchier families. It was known as Saint Luke's fair for many years as it was held on the feast day of Saint Luke. Traders selling goods at the fair were required to pay tolls which were originally paid at a toll booth at the entrance of the fair. In 1790 the booth moved to the Market or Manor Rooms in Newtown Square. Until 1883, there was also a three-day fair at Whitsun which was held at the manor. This was granted in 1267 to John Cogan, who was then the Lord of the manor, along with a right to hold a weekly market.

As well as trade, the fair has also always offered entertainments of various kinds. In the early years these would have been mystery plays with a biblical theme. As time went on however, the plays began to have themes around myth and history. There would have been bear baiting, jugglers, acrobats and puppet shows plus boxing and wrestling matches.

In the 1920s, a miners' strike caused large sell off of pit ponies and prices at Bampton collapsed. In 1928, some ponies were given away for free. In 1972, Mr Baxter leased the right to take tolls at the fair to the town council. This agreement included a clause that the council would pay the business rates associated with the fair, and be responsible for running the fair and cleaning up afterwards. The first payment to Mr Baxter was set at £25. This entailed a lot of organisation by the council such as providing road signs to the fair, cleaning up waste and litter after the fair and traffic management. From 1972, Brook Street was shut to traffic on fair days. The Station Car Park became the site of the funfair in 1973. By 1984, the receipts from the fair were £1040.

After the end of pony sales in 1985, the revenue from the fair began to decline with fewer stallholders than previously and there was an increase in the number of food stalls. In response to this. Bampton Fair Working Group was set up in 1990 which still continues. The fair is now let for a nominal £100.

=== Livestock and cattle markets and fairs ===
The Great Cattle Market at Bampton which started in the 13th century, took place on the last Wednesday in October and at one time up to 14,000 sheep were sold at Bampton Fair. After the Second World War the site of the market at King's Close was sold to developers and the great cattle market closed.

=== Pony sales ===
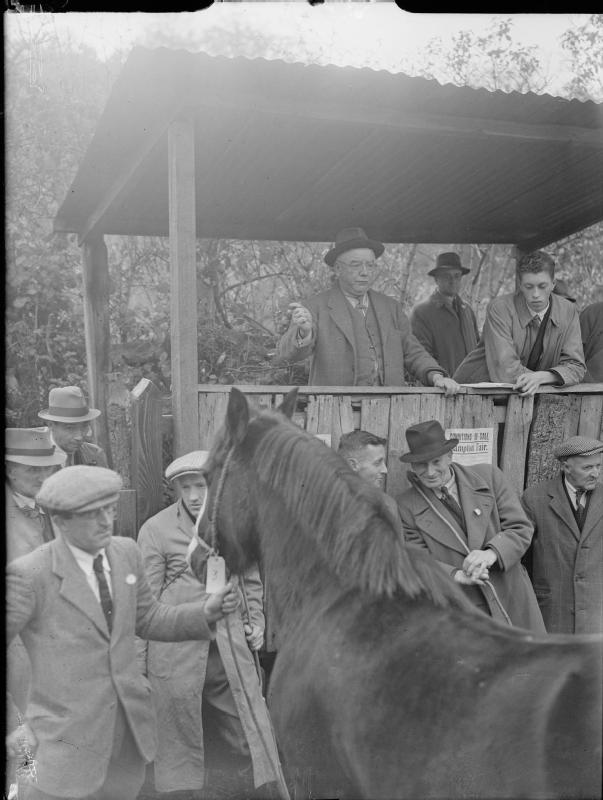
Pony auction at Bampton Fair in 1943

Bampton Fair only began to be well known for the sale of ponies when in 1856, Frederick Knight began selling his ponies at the fair. Exmoor Ponies used to be rounded up on the moors during the so-called Autumn Drift and driven by road to be sold at the fair. After being driven from the moors via Dulverton and Exebridge, the ponies were brought to an old orchard behind the Tiverton Hotel (now called the Quarryman's Rest) where they were kept in wooden pens. The auction ring was a small round pen nearby. Large numbers of fair-goers would pay an entrance fee to see the pony pens. In 1979, the Dartmoor Preservation Society wrote to the RSPCA about suspected cruelty to the ponies at the fair. Then in 1984, a meeting was held between the RSPCA inspectors, vets and the council. A number of recommendations were made to improve the welfare of the ponies, although the meeting did reach a consensus that the fair was more trouble free than any other. At the end of the 1984 fair the RSPCA were satisfied with the way the fair was organised and in 1985 Bampton again received no official complaints about the pony fair. However, the RSPCA and the auctioneers did request a number of improvements to the way ponies were loaded onto lorries and repairs to some of the pens. While alternative sites were offered to hold the sales, the council was unwilling to spend the money needed to fulfil the obligations for an event which was only held once a year. The Ministry of Agriculture and Devon County Council were asked for help but none was provided. From 2004 to 2013, farm-tackle, Exmoor ponies and other livestock were auctioned as part of the Fair again, a little way out of town, at Luttrell Quarry. However, due to a reduction in demand for pony sales and Luttrell Farm becoming unavailable for the auction this has ended.

=== The fair today ===
The fair is still a popular event, not least for its timing during the school half-term break. As well as a traditional funfair, there is a street market, often very crowded, selling novelties, and West Country produce. A song called "Bampton Fair" was written by Paul Wilson; it was among the songs recorded by Tony Rose on Poor Fellows (Dingle's DIN 324).

== Twin towns ==
Villers-Bocage, Calvados, France since 1975

== Transport ==
Buses are run by First Somerset, Somerset Council and Dartline.

== Historic estates ==
- Duvale
