= Feudal barony of Plympton =

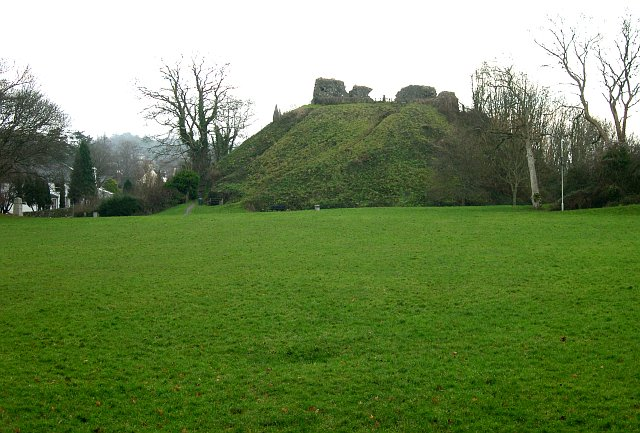
Plympton Castle, the motte with parts of ruined walls of the keep on top

The feudal barony of Plympton (or Honour of Plympton) was a large feudal barony in the county of Devon, England, whose caput was Plympton Castle and manor, Plympton. It was one of eight feudal baronies in Devonshire which existed during the medieval era. It included the so-called Honour of Christchurch in Hampshire (now in Dorset), which was not however technically a barony. The de Redvers family, first holders of the barony, were also Lords of the Isle of Wight, which lordship was not inherited by the Courtenays, as was the barony of Plympton, as it had been sold to the king by the last in the line Isabel de Redvers, 8th Countess of Devon (1237–1293).

== History ==
=== Domesday Book origins ===
Many of the lands which later formed the feudal barony of Plympton were formerly held by two Devon Domesday Book tenants-in-chief of King William the Conqueror (1066–1087):

- Robert d'Aumale (fl. 1086) (Latinised to de Albemarle), who lands are listed in 17 entries in the Domesday Book of 1086. who was lord of Aumale in Normandy, now in the département of Seine-Maritime, France.
- William de Poilley.

== Descent ==
The descent of the feudal barony of Plympton was as follows:

=== de Redvers ===
The arms of de Redvers: Or, a lion rampant azure

- Richard de Redvers (died 1107), was granted the barony (with many other estates) by King Henry I (1100–1135), of which king he was a most trusted supporter. The lands comprising the barony were before this time part of the royal demesne of King William the Conqueror, as recorded in the Domesday Book of 1086.
- Baldwin de Redvers, 1st Earl of Devon (died 1155), son and heir, created first Earl of Devon by the Empress Matilda during The Anarchy.
- Richard de Redvers, 2nd Earl of Devon (died 1162), son.
- Baldwin de Redvers, 3rd Earl of Devon (died 1188), son, died childless.
- Richard de Redvers, 4th Earl of Devon (died c. 1193), brother, died childless.
- William de Redvers, 5th Earl of Devon (died 1217), uncle
- Baldwin de Redvers, 6th Earl of Devon (1217–1245), grandson. He was a minor at the death of his grandfather and thus became a ward of the king, who in 1218 granted possession of the barony to:
  - Falkes de Breauté (died 1226), who married Margaret, mother of his ward the 6th Earl. His estates were confiscated in 1224 and remained in the king's hands until Baldwin attained his majority in 1238.
- Baldwin de Redvers, 7th Earl of Devon (1236–1262), son, died childless.
- Isabel de Redvers, 8th Countess of Devon (1237–1293), sister. She was married at a young age to William de Forz, 4th Earl of Albemarle (died 1260). She was predeceased by all six of her children by William de Forz. After her death in 1293 aged 56 the feudal barony of Plympton and eventually the earldom of Devon passed to her 17-year-old second cousin once removed Hugh de Courtenay (1276–1340), feudal baron of Okehampton, Devon, who in 1335 was declared Earl of Devon. He was the great-grandson of Mary de Vernon (daughter of William de Redvers, 5th Earl of Devon (died 1217)) and her husband Robert de Courtenay (died 1242), feudal baron of Okehampton. In 1314/15 he petitioned parliament, unsuccessfully, claiming his right to the lordship of the Isle of Wight and to the adjacent manor of Christchurch, Hampshire, as heir of Isabella.

=== Courtenay ===
Arms of Courtenay, from about 1200: Or, three torteaux

- Robert de Courtenay (died 1242), feudal baron of Okehampton, son of Reginald de Courtenay (died 1194) by his wife Hawise de Curcy (died 1219), heiress of Okehampton. He married Mary de Vernon, daughter of William de Redvers, 5th Earl of Devon (died 1217), feudal baron of Plympton. From this marriage the Courtenays later inherited the barony of Plympton in 1293 and in 1335 were declared Earls of Devon.
- John de Courtenay (died 1274), (son) who married Isabel de Vere, daughter of Hugh de Vere, 4th Earl of Oxford (c. 1210 – 1263)
- Sir Hugh de Courtenay (died 1292), (son) who married Eleanor le Despenser (died 1328), daughter of Hugh le Despenser, 1st Earl of Winchester (1261–1326).
- Hugh Courtenay, 9th Earl of Devon (1276–1340), (son). In 1293 on the death of his cousin Isabella de Forz, Countess of Devon (1237–1293) (eldest daughter of Baldwin de Redvers, 6th Earl of Devon (1217–1245), feudal baron of Plympton in Devon) he became heir to the feudal barony of Plympton, and in 1335 was declared Earl of Devon. The descent of the feudal barony of Okehampton thenceforth follows the descent of the earldom of Devon. In 1539 King Henry VIII seized the lands of the barony and had Henry Courtenay, 1st Marquess of Exeter (died 1539) executed for treason. The Earldom of Devon became forfeit, and the Courtenay lands in Cornwall escheated (i.e. reverted) to the crown to be held by the Duchy of Cornwall.

== List of constituent manors ==
The barony comprised originally the following manors held in-chief per baroniam:

No. of knight's fees 4 Edw II	Name of Fee in Domesday	Name of Tenant in Domesday*	current or last known name
1 fee, 100s	Aveton	Roald Dubbed	Aveton Gifford
1/2 fee, 50s	Lobe	Roald Dubbed	Lobb & North Lobb, Braunton
1 fee, 100s	Podiford	Roald Dubbed	West Putford
1/2 fee, 50s	Wenford	Roald Dubbed	Wonford in Thornbury, Black Torrington
	Merland	Roald Dubbed	Peters Marland
1/4 fee, 25s	Sigeford	Roald Dubbed	Sigford in Ilsington
	[part of] Peeke or Tamerlande*	Roald Dubbed	Northcott
	Plympton	William of Poilley	Radford next to Goosewell
1 fee, 100s	Witcerce	Roald Dubbed	Whitchurch
1 fee, 100s	Lanbretone	Roald Dubbed	Lamerton
3/4 fee, 75s	Chempbere	Roald Dubbed	East & West Kimber in Northlew
1/4 fee, 25s	Radecliua	Roald Dubbed	Great Rutleigh
1 fee, 100s	Were	Roald Dubbed	Weare Giffard
1/12 fee, 8s 4d	Polham	Roald Dubbed	Pulham
1 fee, 100s	Colecome	Robert of Aumale	Collacombe
	Weslege	Robert of Aumale	Westleigh
3 1/2 fees, 350s	Stoghes	Robert of Aumale	Stoke, Plymouth
1 fee, 100s	odelea	Robert of Aumale	Woodleigh
1 fee, 100s	Beuleie	Robert of Aumale	Beenleigh
1 fee, 100s	Flutes	Robert of Aumale	Fleet
1/6 fee, 16s 8d	Witewei	Baldwin FitzGilbert	Whiteway, Kingsteignton
1/2 fee, 50s	Elforde	Robert Bastard	Efford
1/2 fee, 50s	Gosewelle	William of Poilley	Goosewell
1/4 fee, 25s	Haroldesore	William of Poilley	Hazard
1/4 fee, 25s	Cumbe	Robert the Bastard	Combe Royal
1/4 fee, 25s	Blacheurde	Robert the Bastard	Blackford in Cornwood or Blatchworthy in Stoodleigh
1/4 fee, 25s		Robert the Bastard	Lovaton
1/4 fee, 25s	Bicheford	Robert Bastard	Bickford
1/4 fee, 25s	Bachestane	Robert Bastard	[West & East] Backstone
1 fee, 100s / 1 fee, 100s	Ilestintona	Ralph Pagan	Ilsington / Ingston (near Haytor Rocks)
1 fee, 100s	Ascerewelle	William of Poilley	Shirwell
1 fee, 100s	Essestone	Emma of Hellean	Higher Ashton
1/2 fee, 50s	Hacheurde	Emma of Hellean	Hakeworthy in Tedburn St Mary
1/6 fee, 16s 8d		Emma of Hellean	Hilion's Mill & Hilions Barton, Sandford
1/2 fee, 50s	Leuge	Godbold the Bowman	Doddiscombsleigh
1/2 fee, 50s	Lewendone	Godbold the Bowman	Lowton
1 fee, 100s	Brigeford	Godbold the Bowman	Brushford
1/2 fee, 50s	Molecote	Godbold the Bowman	Mullacott
1/2 fee, 50s	Burne	Godbold the Bowman	Burn, Silverton (part of Tarrant Rushton hamlet)
1/4 fee, 25s	Helescaue	Godbold the Bowman	Hele Barton
1/2 fee, 50s	Cliforda / Halestou	Godbold the Bowman	Clifford (or East Clifford)
	Carme	Godbold the Bowman	North & South Quarm in Somerset
1/2 fee, 50s	Stoches	Nicholas the Bowman	Stokeinteignhead
1 fee, 100s	Grennelize	Nicholas the Bowman	Greenslinch in Silverton
1 fee, 100s	Rachun	Nicholas the Bowman	Middle Rocombe
1 fee, 100s	Bochelande	Nicholas the Bowman	Challermoor? / Buckland-in-the-Moor
1 fee, 100s	Bagetore	Nicholas the Bowman	Bagtor
1/2 fee, 50s	Woguwel	Nicholas the Bowman	Church Ogwell in East Ogwell
1/2 fee, 50s	Estapeleia	Nicholas the Bowman	Staplehill, Teignbridge
1/2 fee, 50s	Holebeme	Nicholas the Bowman	Hobbin in East Ogwell
1/2 fee, 50s	clist	Osbern of Sacey	Clyst Gerred
1/2 fee, 50s	Begeurde	William of Poilley	Beaworthy
1 fee, 100s		Baldwin FitzGilbert	Friars Hele
1 fee, 100s	Yudeford	Nicholas the Bowman	Ideford
		Fulcher the Bowman	
2/3 fee, 66s	Esselingeforda	Fulcher the Bowman	Shillingford St George
	Ferentone	Fulcher the Bowman	Farringdon, Buddleigh
1/2 fee, 50s	Colum	Fulcher the Bowman	Columbjohn
1 fee, 100s	Sandford	William of Poilley	Sampford Spiney
	Tauetone	William the Conqueror	North Tawton
1 fee, 100s	Pontimore	Halmaic of Arcis	Poltimore
1/2 fee, 50s / 1/4 fee, 25s	Baverdone / Torintone	King William / Baldwin the Sheriff / King William	Beaford
1/2 fee, 50s	Bradestone	William the Conqueror	Bradstone
1/5 fee, 20s	Nochecote	Gerard	Nitchacott, Tiverton
1/4 fee, 25s / 1/6 fee, 16s 8d	Levelege	Godbold the Bowman / Leofric	Lowley
1/2 fee, 50s	Cadebirie	William of Poilley	Cadbury
[portion of] 1 fee, 100s	Ulfaldeshodes	William of Poilley	Woolfardisworthy
[portion of] 1 fee, 100s	Blachegrave	William of Poilley / Judhael of Totnes	Blagrove
1/2 fee, 50s	Trule	Ralph Paynel	Throwleigh
1 fee, 100s		Roald Dubbed	Luffincott
	Hanemardun	Roald Dubbed	Hemerdon
	Docheorde	Roald Dubbed	(Little & West) Dockworthy (& Dockworthy Cross)
1/2 fee, 50s	Plumtrei	Odo son of Gamelin	Plymtree
1/5 fee, 20s	Lege	William of Poilley	Challonsleigh
1 fee, 100s	Brige	Roald Dubbed	Bridgerule
		Robert Bastard	Plympton
1/3 fee, 33s 4d	Ermentone	King William	Ermington
1 fee, 100s	Teweberie	Robert of Aumale	Thuborough
1/4 fee, 25s	Lanforda	Osbern of Sacey	Little Lamford in Cheriton Bishop
2 fees, 200s			Stokenham
1/2 + 1/10 fee, 60s		William the Conqueror	Witheridge
1/4 fee, 25s		Judhel of Totnes	
3/4 fee, 75s		Judhel of Totnes	Compton
1/2 fee, 50s	Gildescote	Robert of Aumale	Gidcott
3/4 fee, 75s	Wiche	Robert of Aumale	[Cookbury] Wick
2 fees, 200s		Roald Dubbed	Twigbear
1 1/2 fees, 150s	Whitefelle	Robert of Aumale	Whitefield near Bittadon (in Marwood)
1 fee, 100s	Godelege	Robert of Aumale	Goodleigh
1/4 fee, 25s	Estocha	William of Poilley	Stoke Rivers
1/5 fee, 20s	Derte	William of Poilley	Dart Raffe
1/2 fee, 50s	Worth	William of Poilley	Worth in Washfield
	Derte	William of Poilley	Dart (in Cadeleigh)
	Bovelie	William of Poilley	Bowley in Cadbury
	Cressewalde	Ralph Paynel	Kerswell in Broadhembury
		Godbold the Bowman	Whiteheathfield in Cullompton
	Codeford	Odo son Edwin of Butterleigh	Coddiford
	Clist	Odo son Edwin of Butterleigh	Clyst William in Plymtree
	Topeshant	William the Conqueror	Topsham
	Crochewella	Roald Dubbed	Crockernwell
	Seluestan	Osbern of Sacey	Shilstone in Drewsteignton
	Cageffort	Ralph Paynel	Wonston with Morchington in Throwleigh
	Witestani	William de Ow	Whitstone
	Dunesford	Sæwulf	Sowton or Little Dunsford in Dunsford
	Dunsedoc	Ralph Paynel	Dunchideock
	Leualiga	King's military thane (Godbold or Godebold the Bowman)	Lowly in Doddiscombsleigh
	Assecote	William of Poilley	Assecote [?]
	Forhode	William of Poilley	Farwood Barton (in Talaton?)
	Bichelie	William of Poilley	Bickleigh
	Bichecome	Robert of Aumale	Bickham Barton near Bickham Moor
	Merehode	Robert of Aumale	Marwood
	Mideltone	Robert of Aumale	Milton Damerel
	Odetreu	Robert of Aumale	Ottery
	Oladone	Baldwin FitzGilbert	Woollaton

*Domesday tenants identified in Testa de Nevil

The following fees originally held by Alfred the Breton may have also been part of the Honour

No. of knight's fees 4 Edw II	Name of Fee in Domesday	Name of Tenant in Domesday	current name
1 fee, 100s	Morlei	Alfred the Breton	Moreleigh
1 fee, 100s	Bacheleford	Alfred the Breton	Battleford in Ipplepen
1 fee, 100s	Lege	Alfred the Breton	Grimpstonleigh in Moreleigh
1 fee, 100s	Grismetone	Alfred the Breton	Grimstone in Blackawton
1 fee, 100s	Tambretone	Alfred the Breton	Tamerton Foliot
1 fee, 100s	Tawi	Alfred the Breton	Peter Tavy
1/2 fee, 50s	Blachestane	Alfred the Breton	Blaxton
1 fee, 100s	Mideltone	Alfred the Breton	Horsewell / South Milton
1/2 fee, 50s	Sprei	Alfred the Breton	Sprytown aka Spry in Stowford
1 fee, 100s	Esseberie	Alfred the Breton	Ashbury
1 fee, 100s	Wifleurde	Alfred the Breton	Willsworthy in Peter Tavy
1 fee, 100s	Bucheside	Alfred the Breton	Budockshed
	Corneurde	Alfred the Breton	Curworthy farm in Shirwell
1 fee, 100s	Genelie	Alfred the Breton	Ingleigh (Green) in Broadwoodkelly
1 fee, 100s	Ulgeberge	Alfred the Breton	Ugborough
		Alfred the Breton	Redway in Rewe

== Sources ==
- Cokayne, G. E. (1916). Gibbs, Vicary & Doubleday, H. Arthur (eds.). The Complete Peerage of England, Scotland, Ireland, Great Britain and the United Kingdom, extant, extinct or dormant (Dacre to Dysart). Vol. 4 (2nd ed.). London: The St Catherine Press.
- Pole, Sir William (died 1635), Collections Towards a Description of the County of Devon, Sir John-William de la Pole (ed.), London, 1791, pp. 6–11, Plimton
- Sanders, I.J. English Baronies: A Study of their Origin and Descent 1086–1327, Oxford, 1960, pp. 137–8, Barony of Plympton
- Thorn, Caroline & Frank, (eds.) Domesday Book, (Morris, John, gen.ed.) Vol. 9, Devon, Parts 1 & 2, Phillimore Press, Chichester, 1985, chapter 1,17
