= Aylestone (disambiguation) =

Aylestone is an area of Leicester, England.

Aylestone may also refer to:

- Aylestone, an area of Hereford, England, location of Aylestone School
- Herbert Bowden, Baron Aylestone (1905–1994), British Labour Party politician

== See also ==
- Aylestone Park (disambiguation)
- Ailstone, a village in Warwickshire, England
