= Ofspring Blackall =

The Right Reverend Ofspring Blackall
- Bishop of Exeter
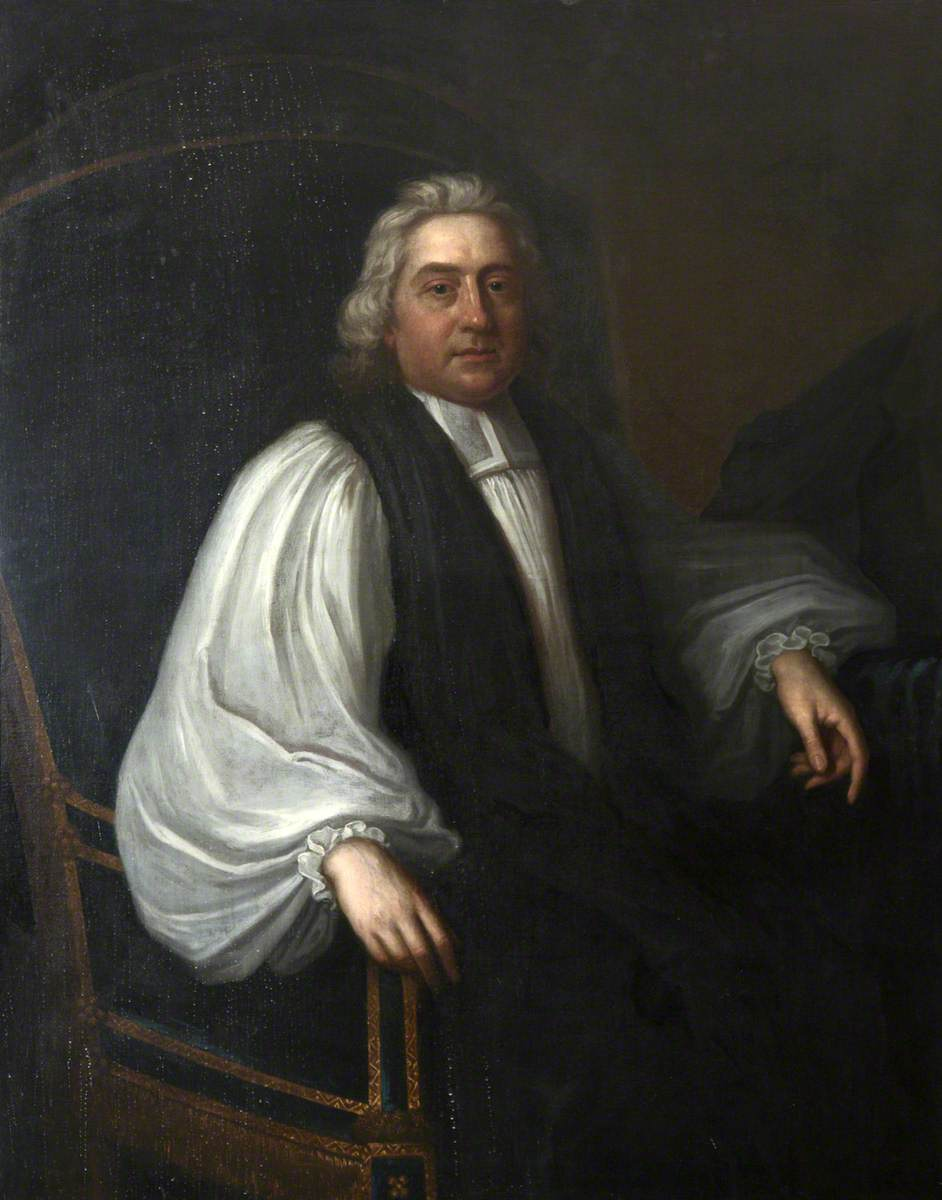
- Province: Canterbury
- Diocese: Exeter
- Installed: 1708
- Term ended: 1716
- Predecessor: Jonathan Trelawny
- Successor: Lancelot Blackburne
- Other posts: Rector of St Antholin's, London; Rector of South Ockendon, Essex; Rector of St Mary Aldermary

Orders
- Ordination: 11 March 1676-7

Personal details
- Born: 26 April 1655 London, Middlesex, England
- Died: 29 November 1716 (aged 61) Exeter, Devon, England
- Buried: Exeter Cathedral
- Denomination: Church of England
- Residence: Exeter
- Parents: Thomas Blackall, Martha Ofspring
- Spouse: Anne Dillingham
- Children: Theophilus, John, Charles Ofspring, Elizabeth, Ann, Mary, and Jane
- Education: St Catharine's College, Cambridge

Ofspring Blackall (26 April 1655 (baptised) – 29 November 1716), Bishop of Exeter and religious controversialist, was born in London.

== Early life and education ==
Baptized on 26 April 1655 at St Gregory by Paul's, he was the son of Thomas Blackall (bapt. 1621; died 1688), freeman of the Haberdashers' Company and later alderman of the City of London, and his wife, Martha (bapt. 1625; d. 1701?), daughter of Charles Ofspring, rector of St Antholin, Budge Row, and trier of the second presbyterian classis (or eldership) of London. Blackall's father owned land in several counties as well as property in the city, and although he conformed to the established church may have retained some puritan sympathies.

During Blackall's youth his parents resided in Lordshold Manor, an 'ancient brick house' in Dalston, Middlesex (VCH Middlesex, 10.89). He was educated in nearby Hackney, perhaps at the free school of which Robert Skingle was master, before being admitted as a pensioner to St Catharine's College, Cambridge, on 26 April 1671. He graduated BA in 1675, proceeded MA in 1678, and was elected in 1679 (by the interest, it was rumoured, of William Wake) to a fellowship, which he resigned in 1687. He was ordained deacon on 11 March 1677 and priest on 19 December 1680. The university awarded him the degree of DD in 1700.

== Cleric ==
On 14 January 1690 Blackall was instituted to the rectory of South Ockendon, Essex; he resigned this for the rectory of St Mary Aldermary, London, to which he was presented by the dean and chapter of St Paul's on 6 November 1694. He also held the city lectureships of St Olave Jewry from 1695 to 1698, and St Dunstan-in-the-West from 1698. He was appointed chaplain to William and Mary, although it was later alleged that he had been a nonjuror and had refused to swear allegiance to the new monarchs for two years.

Blackall was nominated to the bishopric of Exeter by the personal determination of Queen Anne, upon the recommendation of John Sharp, archbishop of York, but without the knowledge of her ministers, whose politically expedient recommendations the queen, mindful of the royal prerogative, deemed insufficiently orthodox. It was consequently remarked wittily that he was the 'queen's bishop'. He was consecrated at Lambeth on 8 February 1708. To supplement his episcopal revenues he was permitted to hold, in addition to his bishopric, the deanery of St Buryan, Cornwall, the rectory of Shorbrook, Devon, and the offices of archdeacon and treasurer of Exeter. He was a diligent bishop in his diocese, and he was also instrumental in the institution of charity schools in Exeter. He lived to see the establishment of two such schools for boys and two for girls, of fifty pupils each.

Blackall was consecrated a bishop at Lambeth on 8 February 1708 by the Bishop of London. By a strange twist of fate, Sir William Dawes was on the same date consecrated a bishop at nearby Westminster by the Bishop of Winchester. Dawes later edited and published a posthumous two-volume edition of Blackall's sermons.

== Public life and works ==
Blackall came to public prominence in 1699 when he engaged in a controversy with the Irish deist and pamphleteer John Toland. In his Life of John Milton (1699), Toland had disputed Charles I's authorship of Eikon Basilike. In a brief aside Toland remarked that if such a recent deception could remain undiscovered, it was not surprising that the dubious authorship of some ancient Christian writings had likewise gone undetected. Blackall understood that Toland had slyly insinuated that parts of the New Testament were forgeries. In a sermon before the House of Commons on 30 January 1699, Blackall called on the Commons to act against this denial of the authenticity of the revelation of God, which if left unchecked would undermine public morality as well as Christian doctrine. Toland replied with Amyntor, or, A Defence of Milton's Life (1699), which attacked Blackall in a highly personal manner and accused him of theological ignorance. Toland disingenuously claimed he had disputed the authenticity not of the New Testament, but of 'spurious' apocryphal Christian works, of which he provided an extensive catalogue. Blackall's response, Mr Blackall's Reasons for not Replying to a Book Lately Published Entitled Amyntor (1699), ably demonstrated that Toland's words should most naturally have been taken to have referred to the New Testament, but Blackall nevertheless acknowledged Toland's apparent retraction. Blackall's altercation with Toland had brought him to prominence as a defender of revealed religion against the attacks of the deists. Consequently, he was chosen to deliver the Boyle Lectures in 1700. These consisted of seven sermons, which he preached at St Paul's Cathedral, on the theme 'The sufficiency of a standing revelation'.

Ten years after his exchange with Toland, Blackall found himself embroiled in controversy again, this time with a fellow clergyman. On 8 March 1709, the anniversary of Queen Anne's accession, Blackall preached a sermon before the queen in St James's Chapel, on the text Romans 13:4. It was later published, with the title The Divine Institution of Magistracy (1709). Its themes echoed those of a sermon which Blackall had preached on the same occasion in 1705, at St Dunstan's, and which had also been published. It was a strong attack on the doctrines of popular sovereignty and the right of resistance, in which Blackall maintained that the magistrate's authority was a 'Portion of the Divine Authority ... entrusted with him by God' (p. 3). It also maintained the independent jure divino basis of clerical authority in spiritual matters. Benjamin Hoadly, in Some Considerations Humbly Offered to the … Bishop of Exeter (1709), took offence to both sermons, which, he alleged, condemned the revolution of 1688–9. Hoadly claimed that the revolution had involved resistance to James II, but that such resistance was justified by the necessity of self-preservation. Blackall, in The Lord Bishop of Exeter's Answer to Mr Hoadly's Letter, dismissed Hoadly's premise that civil authority derived from an original contract. He undertook to reply again to Hoadly only if he kept to issues of scriptural interpretation, and avoided speculations concerning matters such as an alleged 'State of Nature' about which the scriptures were silent. Hoadly's subsequent Humble Reply failed to comply with Blackall's conditions, and he did not therefore respond to it. The numerous pamphlets which were published on either side during the ensuing controversy included an anonymous work in support of Blackall, entitled The Best Answer Ever was Made (1709), by the Irish nonjuror and formidable controversialist Charles Leslie. As Blackall was by now a bishop, Hoadly's attack on him was later cited to justify the forthright treatment Hoadly received in the Bangorian controversy, after he himself had been elevated to the episcopal bench.

Ironically Blackall's same accession-day sermon of 1705, The Subjects Duty, had been attacked on its first publication by tory patriarchalist writers, who accused him of being a republican. The anonymous work An essay upon government: wherein the republican schemes reviv'd by Mr. Lock, Dr. Blackal &c. are fairly consider'd and refuted (1705), as well as linking Blackall's name with that of John Locke, took Blackall to task for contending that the precise form of government in any nation was a matter of human, and not divine, institution. Blackall suffered further abuse in a pamphlet entitled Dr Blackall's Offspring (1705).

Despite being attacked from both sides Blackall was considered by contemporaries to have distinct high church and tory principles. Gilbert Burnet went so far as to judge that, although Blackall claimed to be loyal to the government, 'his notions were all on the other side', that is, the Jacobite side, and that he 'seemed to condemn the Revolution, and all that had been done pursuant to it'. In fact Blackall was a consistent 'revolution tory' and maintained the high-church doctrines of passive obedience and non-resistance to sovereign powers, while denying the Filmerian tenet of divine hereditary right. By holding that sovereignty was always absolute, but that it belonged in the English constitution to the monarch in parliament, Blackall was articulating an important theory by which tories reconciled themselves to the revolution.

=== Sermons ===
During his lifetime Blackall's reputation as a preacher was considerable, and his Works were published after his death (2 vols., 1723, edited by Blackall's friend, William Dawes). His major literary work was a series of 87 sermons issued as Discourses on the Sermon on the Mount. These sermons are both expository and pastoral, and in an uncomplicated style; but receded into relative obscurity.

- 1708. Blackall, Offspring. The rules and measures of alms-giving, and the manifold advantages of charity schools. A sermon preach'd at St. Peter's in Exeter, 26 September 1708. First preach'd, and now printed, to promote the setting up of charity schools, for the instruction and education of the children of the poor in that city, and other paces in the diocess. By Offspring, Lord Bishop of Exon. To which is added, his letter to the clergy of his diocess, upon the same subject. – Exon : printed by Sam. Farley, for Phil. Bishop, 1708. – 32p; 4°. – *WSL; Dredge p. 42; Plymouth Athenaeum p. 50; Plymouth Public Library L2897; DUL 4764; Devon & Exeter Institution, appendix, p. 127.
- The divine institution of magistracy, and the gracious design of its institution. A sermon preach'd before the Queen, at St. James's, on Tuesday, 8 March. 1708. … By Ofspring Lord Bishop of Exon. … – London: printed by J. R. for W. Rogers, 1709.. – 24p.; 8+.

== Family life ==
Blackall married Anne Dillingham of London (died 1762), probably the daughter of Theophilus and Elizabeth Dillingham. Seven of their children—Theophilus, John, Charles Ofspring, Elizabeth, Ann, Mary, and Jane—survived the death of their father on 29 November 1716 in Exeter. Blackall had fallen from a horse in the spring of that year, and as a consequence he suffered a long and painful illness during which he developed gangrene. An earnest account of Blackall's life and death, and particularly of the sufferings of his final illness, can be found in William Dawes's preface to Blackall's Works. Blackall was buried on 2 December in Exeter Cathedral, on the south side of the choir. In accordance with his will, no funeral sermon was preached, and his grave was not marked by any monument or inscription. His will was proved on 26 January 1717. He was granted Arms.

His grandson, John Blackall, sixth son of Ofspring's son Theophilius, was a prominent physician and Mayor of Exeter, and John's son (Ofsping's great grandson) Thomas Blackall was the holder of Spitchwick manor and builder of Dr Blackall's Drive.

Church of England titles
Preceded by Jonathan Trelawny	Bishop of Exeter; 1708–1716	Succeeded by Lancelot Blackburne
