= Nicholas the Bowman =

Anglo-Norman landowner

Nicholas the Bowman (fl. 1086) (or "Nicholas the Gunner", Latin: Nicolaus Balistarius or Archibalistarius), also known as Nicholas de la Pole, was a servant of King William the Conqueror (1066-1087) and was one of that king's Devon Domesday Book tenants-in-chief. He was also a tenant-in-chief in Warwickshire and at some time between 1095 and 1100 he exchanged his manor of Ailstone in Warwickshire for the manor of Plymtree in Devon, held by St Peter's Abbey, Gloucester.

== Military office ==
Nicholas was the king's artilleryman, whose role was "the captain or officer in charge of the stone and missile discharging engines used in sieges" These devices were known in Latin as ballista, weapons for throwing "balls", bolts or other projectiles, ranging in size from a cross bow to a large artillery piece. His name was traditionally translated as "the Gunner", as the word gun was in use in the English language for such purely mechanical devices before the introduction of gunpowder, but to avoid confusion his name is now given in modern sources as "the Bowman", although strictly inaccurately.

== Devonshire holdings ==
His 12 holdings in Devonshire are listed in the following order in the Domesday Book (manor, parish, hundred):

- Webbery, Alverdiscott, Fremington hundred;
- Greenslinch, Silverton, Hayridge hundred;
- Stoke-in-Teignhead, Wonford hundred;
- Rocombe, in the parish of Stoke-in-Teignhead, Wonford hundred;
- East Ogwell, Wonford hundred;
- Holbeam, Ogwell, Wonford hundred;
- Bagtor, Ilsington, Teignbridge hundred;
- Ideford, Teignbridge hundred;
- Staplehill, Ilsington, Teignbridge hundred;
- Buckland-in-the-Moor, Haytor hundred (possibly formerly in Teignbridge hundred);
- Aller, Abbot's Kerswell, Haytor hundred;
- Northleigh, probably in Colyton hundred.
