= Frederick Campling =

English cricketer and Royal Air Force officer (1908–1945)

Personal information
- Full name: Frederick Stratford Campling
- Born: 9 June 1908; Basford, Nottinghamshire, England
- Died: 22 March 1945 (aged 36); Sandakan, Borneo, Japanese-occupied Dutch East Indies

Domestic team information
- Years: Team
- 1935–1939: Devon
- 1929/30–1933/34: Orange Free State

Career statistics
Competition	First-class
Matches	5
Runs scored	59
Batting average	9.83
100s/50s	–/–
Top score	16
Balls bowled	350
Wickets	11
Bowling average	22.09
5 wickets in innings	–
10 wickets in match	–
Best bowling	4/75
Catches/stumpings	–/–
- Source: CricketArchive, 10 August 2020

Frederick Stratford Campling (9 June 1908 – 22 March 1945) was an English cricketer and Royal Air Force airman. His batting and bowling styles are unknown. He was born in Basford, Nottinghamshire.

Campling made his first-class debut in South Africa for Orange Free State against Rhodesia in 1930. He played five first-class matches in his career, all for Orange Free State and spread over a period of four years. His final first-class match came in the 1933/34 season against Border. In his five first-class matches for Orange Free State he scored 59 runs at a batting average of 9.83, with a high score of 16. Predominantly a bowler, he took 11 wickets at a bowling average of 22.09, with best figures of 4/75. He later played Minor Counties Championship cricket for Devon between 1935 and 1939.

Campling served in the Second World War. He was serving with the Royal Air Force Volunteer Reserve as part of No. 258 Squadron in Burma, where he held the rank of Leading Aircraftman. He became a prisoner of war to the Japanese, becoming a victim of the Sandakan Death Marches when he died on 22 March 1945. He is commemorated on the Kranji War Memorial in Singapore and the Ilsington War Memorial in Ilsington, Devon.
