= Spitchwick =

Historic estate in Devon, England

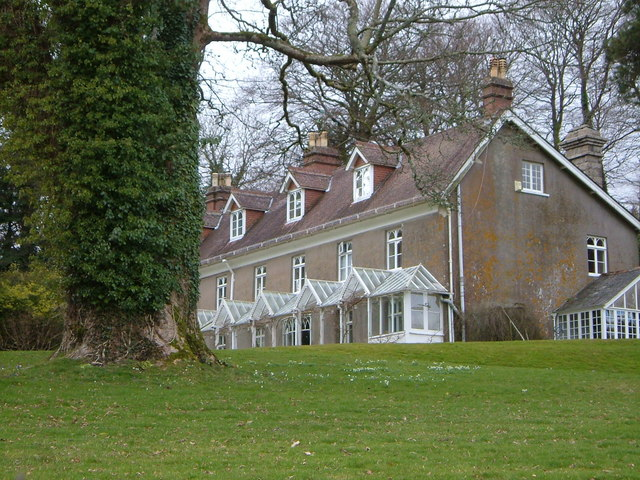
Spitchwick House in 2006, viewed from east

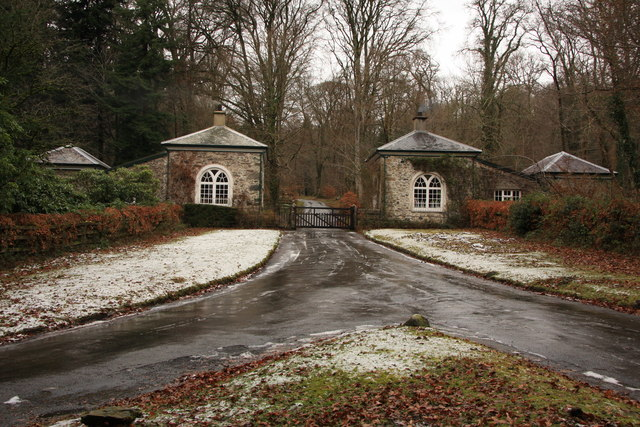
Lower Lodge, gatehouse to Spitchwick House

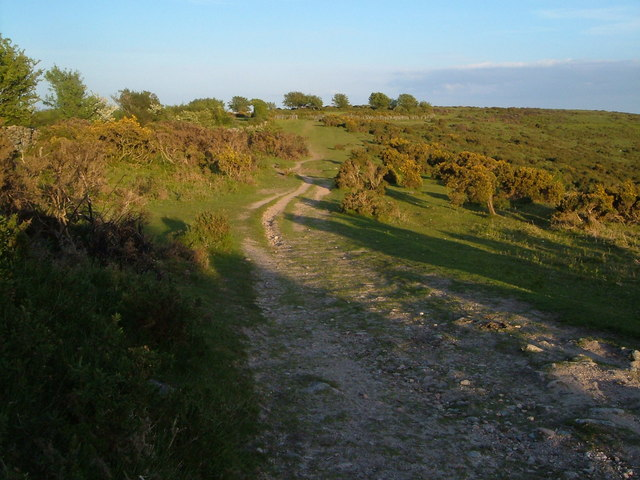
"Dr Blackall's Drive", part of the carriage drive created by Thomas Blackall (d.1899), MD, of Spitchwick in the C19. Here it approaches Brake Corner and Aish Tor, skirting fields on the left

Spitchwick is an historic estate situated within the parish of Widecombe-in-the-Moor, Devon. The present 19th century mansion house known as Spitchwick Manor is situated four miles north-west of Ashburton, the gardens of which are open to the paying public.

== History ==
=== Domesday Book ===
As listed in the Domesday Book of 1086, SPICEWITE was the 48th of the 72 manors held in demesne by King William the Conqueror in the County of Devon.

=== Feudal barony of Stogursey ===
Spitchwick later became a possession of the de Courcy family, feudal barons of Stogursey (anciently "Stoke Courcy") in Somerset.

=== de Spichewik ===
The manor is listed in the 13th century Book of Fees as held as one knight's fee by Michael de Spichewik, whose family as was usual had taken their surname from their seat. His overlord was John Neville, then feudal baron of Stogursey. At some time a grant was made to Troarn Abbey in Normandy of unum hospitem in Espicewic, apparently "one guest lodging/chamber/inn".

=== Dunning ===
The large manor of Widecombe-in-the-Moor on Dartmoor was acquired by John Dunning (1731–1783), from 1782 1st Baron Ashburton, and included a farm called "Park", to which shortly after his acquisition he had "added a room or two". This was the origin of the mansion house, later known as "Spitchwick Park", which he subsequently built.

Lord Ashburton was born at nearby Ashburton, the son of a local attorney of modest yeoman family, and had an eminent career as a lawyer and Member of Parliament, rising to the office of Solicitor General in 1768. As Solicitor-General he acquired the then unprecedented sum of £10,000 per annum and as a money-lender he had obtained estates that brought him in large sums.

But his main acquisition of lands had been to the detriment of the ancient Gould family of Devonshire, which traced its roots back to a certain "John Gold", a crusader present at the Siege of Damietta in (1218–19). Edward Gould (1666-1736) of Pridhamsleigh in the parish of Staverton, Devon, was the last male of the senior branch of the Gould family, and bequeathed all his lands in Staverton, Ashburton, Holne, Widdecombe-on-the-Moor and Chudleigh to his infant distant cousin William Drake Gould (1719-1766) of Lew Trenchard, Devon, the representative of the next branch. The estates of William Drake Gould devolved on his only son Edward Gould (1740-1788), a spendthrift and a gambler. One evening after a game of cards in which he had lost "every guinea he had about him", he rode off, put a black mask over his face as a highwayman, waylaid the winner of the game and shot him dead. That Edward Gould was a very distant relative of Dunning's, and Dunning defended him successfully at his ensuing murder trial in about 1768. (Dunning's great-aunt Margaret Dunning (d.1662), whose monumental brass survives in Staverton Church, married (as his first wife) Edward Gould (1637-1675) of Pridhamsleigh, Staverton, who by his second wife was the father of Edward Gould (1666-1736)). Dunning lent Edward Gould increasingly large sums secured on mortgages, and he eventually foreclosed, securing for himself possession of most of the Gould estates around Ashburton, Widdecombe, Holne, and Staverton. Edward Gould ended his days in lodgings in Shaldon. Dunning then purchased for £4,700 the 88 year residue of a lease of ninety-nine years of the manors of Spitchwick and Widdecombe.

It had been Dunning's original intention to build a grand mansion elsewhere in Devon, on his estate of Sandridge in the parish of Stoke Gabriel, as he informed Rev John Swete to whom he was showing that new purchase, also in the company of Sir Robert Palk, 1st Baronet (1717-1798), who also expanded a large mansion and planted vast expanses of woodland at Haldon House, having also had a change of mind as to location, in his case from Tor Mohun to Haldon. He was at first "struck with the beauty and grandeur of the spot (i.e. of Sandridge) and...then express'd an intention of raising an house on it that should be more worthy than the present of the situation". This then existing house at Sandridge was the former seat of the Gilbert family formerly of Compton Castle in the parish of Marldon. Although Dunning changed his mind and built at Spitchwick instead, after his death in 1783 his widow in 1805 finally built the envisioned mansion at Sandridge, now surviving as Sandridge Park. As for Lord Ashburton's change of mind, Swete remarked: "He soon dropt all thoughts of proceding with the plans he had form'd at Sandridge; Park indeed was a situation more congenial to Lord Ashburton's mind; it was wild and romantic; he delighted its softening the harsh and rude features of the scene around him and in its meliorating the grounds, which lay almost in a state of nature, neglected and uncultur'd".

Lord Ashburton created at Spitchwick (on the site of a chapel dedicated to St. Laurence) a mansion in which "he much delighted to reside" and where he "escap'd from the trammels of State and the bustle of the Great Town, and enjoy'd the otium cum dignitate. This was his Tusculum and here" (as he often told Swete) "(with) his rural amusements, with his books, his friends, his dearest Leisure...he past his pleasantest hours". The Devon historian and author Sabine Baring-Gould (1834-1924), a distant relative of his great-uncle by marriage Edward Gould (d.1675), and who himself inherited the Gould manor of Lew Trenchard, which otherwise would have been part of Dunning's estate, called Spitchwick an "ugly house" and in his largely unflattering biography suggested that Lord Ashburton had "like the cuckoo, kick(ed the Gould family) out of their nest and gather(ed) all their property into his own hands.

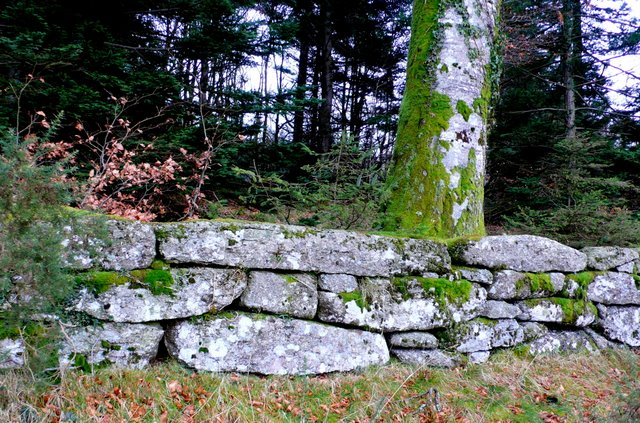
Dry-stone wall near Spitchwick made from massive blocks of granite of the type described by Swete as built by Dunning

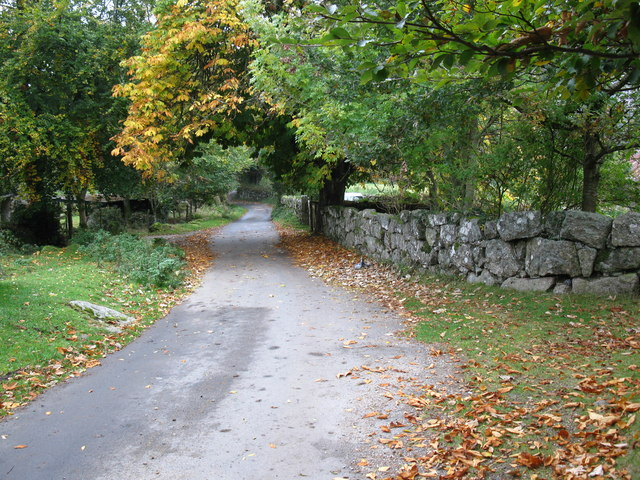
Massive block stone wall at Bonehill, near Widdecombe

He made great improvements by planting woodland and enlarged the estate by further land purchases.

"The granate masses which thick-studded even his best meadows he blew to pieces and remov'd; the hills which rose behind the house he cover'd over with plantations" (assisted by the good judgement of his friend Swete, a connoisseur of landscaping) "and he raised a garden wall of such enormous blocks of moorstone that it hath been consider'd as the wonder of the country, and which doubtless may bid defiance to all attacks but that of an earthquake".

The high garden wall survives today enclosing a "massive vegetable garden" of 2.6 acres. He built a "secret garden" within which survives "Lady Ashburton's Bath" a plunge-pool built in 1763, fed by a stream. Lord Ashburton also had a seat at Bagtor in the parish of Ilsington, on his Dartmoor estate about 6 miles north-east of Spitchwick.

Lord Ashburton's house at Spitchwick has been superseded by the present surviving 19th-century building, and of the earlier house only two gate lodges survive, Upper Lodge and Lower Lodge, survive at the end of their respective long entrance drives.

Lord Ashburton's estate at "Park", later called Spitchwick, should be distinguished from the estate of Parke in the parish of Bovey Tracey situated 1/2 mile west of Bovey Tracey and about 7 miles north-east of Spitchwick, today (at Parke House) the headquarters of the Dartmoor National Park Authority, a large white rendered house built by William Hole in 1826. The two estates appear to have been confused by Pevsner.

=== Blackall ===
Spitchwick was purchased in 1867 by Thomas Blackall (d.1899), MD, an eminent surgeon, and Sheriff of Exeter in 1862, also of Maryfield, Pennsylvania, Exeter, using a fortune inherited from his father, John Blackall, also a prominent doctor.

He made a number of improvements to the estate and it's over 2,200 acres of land, and during the 1880s he instructed a Gerald Warren to construct a scenic drive where he could take his carriage to best show off the beauty of the Dart valley for himself and his guests, making this amongst the earliest examples of a scenic drive.

He constructed a 2 mile long carriage drive over Dartmoor, known as Dr Blackall's Drive for use in picturesque drives with his guests.

=== Struben ===
In 1901 Spitchwick was purchased by Frederick Struben (1851-1931) a South African geologist and goldminer, born in Pietermaritzburg, South Africa, of German descent. With his brother Harry in 1884 he was the first to strike gold in Johannesburg and called their mine "Confidence Reef". Although the seam of gold was disappointingly small, nevertheless they both made fortunes. They owned parts of the adjoining farms Sterkfontein and Wilgespruit in what is now Roodepoort. Fred Struben recalled: "In January 1884 I started prospecting on the Sterkfontein farm at the west end of the range. The second day I found a reef showing gold, which assayed on the surface 6 penny weights, and at 50 feet had improved so that the sum had reached nearly 2 ounces." His widow sold Spitchwick in 1934 to the Simpson family.

=== Simpson ===
The Simpson family purchased Spitchwick in 1934. In 1937 Stephen Simpson of Spitchwick purchased further the Dartmoor estate of Holne.
