= Thomas Blackall =

English physician

Thomas Blackall (18 May 1814 – 11 May 1899) was an English physician, son of another renowned physician John Blackall. Born in Devon, he attended Cambridge, before working as a physician in London, and then returning to Devon on the death of his father, where he used his inheritance to purchase the large Spitchwick estate.

== Early life ==
Thomas was the son of Exeter physician and Mayor of Exeter John Blackall, who was grandson of Ofspring Blackall, Bishop of Exeter.

He attended Exeter Grammar School and Westminster School for his education, before attending Caius College at Cambridge University in 1832, winning a scholarship in 1833, and graduating with a BA in 1837.

== Medical career ==
Blackall did his medical training at St George's Hospital, before starting his own private practice in Mayfair, and working as visiting physician to the Seamen's Hospital in Greenwich.

At some point, he moved back to Exeter, taking on the Maryfield estate, in Pennsylvania and in 1862, he was made Sheriff of Exeter. Maryfield remained his main residence for the rest of his life.

== Spitchwick ==
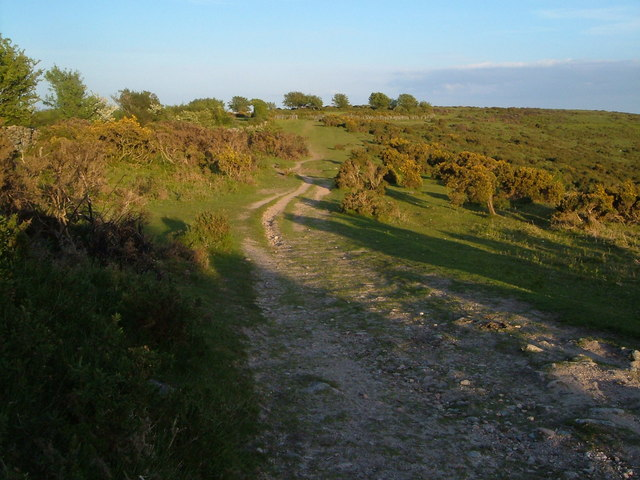
Part of Dr Blackall's Drive

Following the death of his father John in 1860, Thomas inherited a significant fortune, and purchased the large Spitchwick estate near Widecombe-in-the-Moor, Devon in 1867, with over 2,200 acres of land, as his country retreat in addition to his Exeter home.

He undertook much improvement of the house, including the installing of heated glasshouses.

He is also notable for his construction of Dr Blackall's Drive in the 1880s, a long scenic carriage drive used for guests visiting his house at Spitchwick.

== Death ==
Blackall died in 1899, at his house in Pennsylvania, Exeter, with an estate proved at £162,000. In his will, he made a number of bequests, including a portrait of his father to the Royal College of Physicians, and cash donations to Exeter charities including the Devon and Exeter Hospital, the Exeter Dispensary, the West of England Eye Infirmary, and the Deaf and Dumb Institution (now the Deaf Academy).

He left his housekeeper a lifetime interest in Spitchwick House, as well as an income for life and provision for her daughter. He also made cash bequests to a long list of other employees.
