= South Milton =

Village and civil parish in south Devon, England

Coordinates: 50°16′N 3°49′W

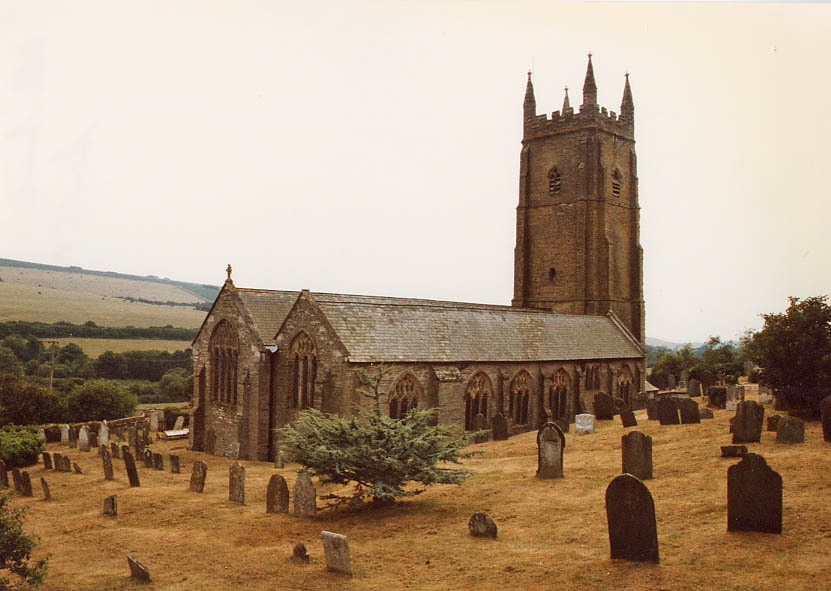
- All Saints Church, South Milton

- Location within Devon
- Population: 371 (2021 census)
- Civil parish: South Milton
- District: South Hams
- Shire county: Devon
- Region: South West
- Country: England
- Sovereign state: United Kingdom

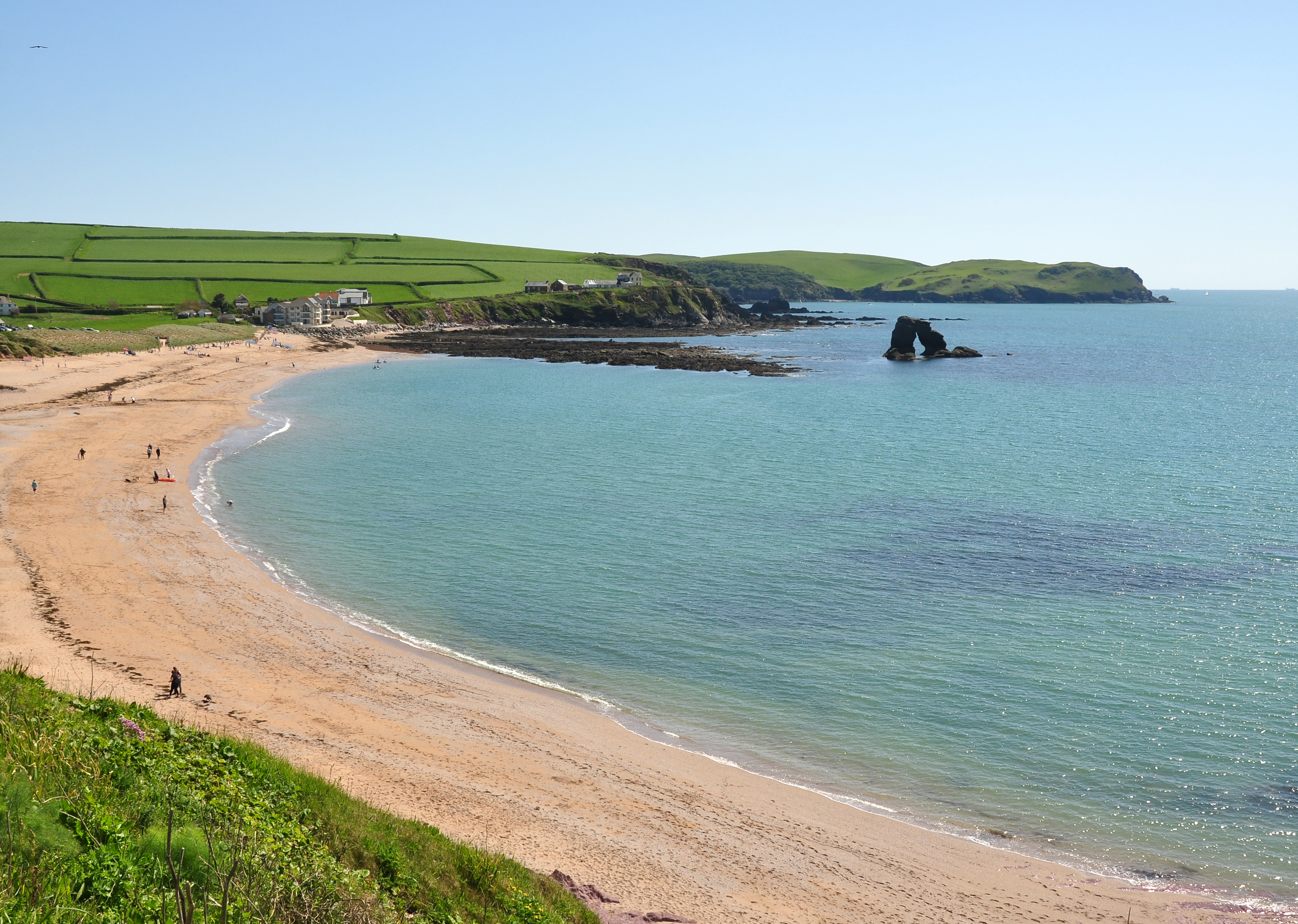
South Milton Sands

South Milton (anciently Mideltone, Middleton, Middelton, etc.) is a village and civil parish in the South Hams district, in the county of Devon, England, situated on the south coast about 2 miles south-west of Kingsbridge. The civil parish includes the hamlets of Sutton, south of the village, and Upton, north of the village. In 2021 the parish had a population of 371.

The mediaeval parish church is dedicated to All Saints. Horswell House, an 18th-century mansion within the parish, was anciently a seat of the Roope family, also of East Allington, whose heir in 1761 was the Ilbert family.

== Manor ==
The manor of Mideltone is listed in the Domesday Book of 1086 as the 15th of the 22 Devonshire holdings of Alfred the Breton, one of the Devon Domesday Book tenants-in-chief of King William the Conqueror. It was held in 1295 by James "de Mosom" (or "de Mohun", according to Pole, apparently a member of the Mohuns, feudal barons of Dunster in Somerset).

=== Pipard ===
In 1345, it was held by Sir William Pipard (d. 1349). He left two daughters and co-heiresses:

- Margaret Pipard, wife of Sir Gerard de Lisle
- Matilda Pipard, wife of Sir Osbert Hameley

=== Carew ===
The next holder was the Carew family of Haccombe, Devon, which sold it to Sir James Bagg of Saltram, near Plymouth.

=== Bagg ===
Sir James I Bagg (1554/5–1624), MP for Plymouth (1601–1611) and Mayor of Plymouth, purchased Saltram in about 1614. On his death the house passed to his son James II Bagg (died 1638), Deputy Governor of Plymouth and a vice-admiral closely allied to the Duke of Buckingham, a favourite of King James I. He is believed twice to have embezzled funds from the Crown, the first occasion having contributed to the failure of Buckingham's attack on Cádiz in 1625. For reason unknown King Charles I twice defended him despite his seemingly obvious culpability. James II Bagg died in 1638 and was succeeded by his son George Bagg, when Saltram was described as comprising "One great mansion house, one stable, three gardens, two acres of orchard, eight acres of meadows" and eight acres more. Despite inheriting his father's role as Deputy Governor of Plymouth, George Bagg did not share his father's luck, and having chosen the Royalist side in the Civil War, Saltram suffered at the hands of the Parliamentarian forces. Following the defeat of the Royalist cause, shortly after 1643 he was forced to compound in the sum of £582 to secure his landholdings. Despite having held on to Saltram through the Civil War, the Baggs lost Saltram in 1660, shortly before the Restoration of the Monarchy when the Commonwealth government transferred it to the former Parliamentarian captain Henry Hatsell in payment of a large debt owed by Bagg.

=== Morrice ===
The manor was subsequently the property of Sir William Morrice (1602–1676) of Werrington in Devon, Secretary of State for the Northern Department and a Lord of the Treasury from June 1660 to September 1668.

=== Prideaux ===
In 1810 the manor belonged to Walter Prideaux, attorney-at-law at Totnes, apparently a member of that ancient and widespread family seated at Orcheton, Modbury; Adeston, Holbeton; Thuborough, Sutcombe; Soldon, Holsworthy; Netherton, Farway; Ashburton; Nutwell, Woodbury; Ford Abbey, Thorncombe; (also Prideaux Place, Padstow and Prideaux Castle, Luxulyan, Cornwall).
