= Robert Bastard =

Norman baron

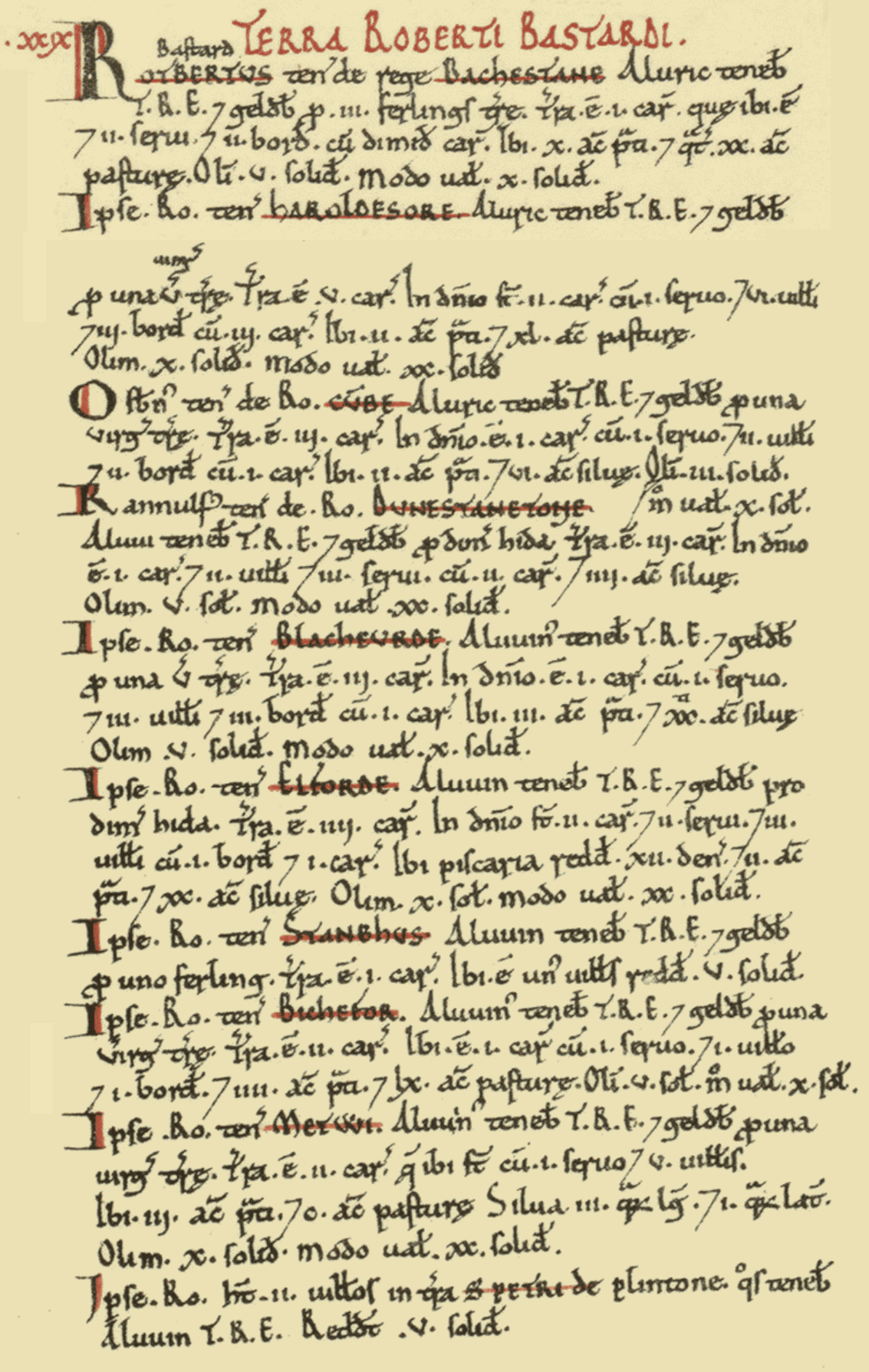
Domesday Book, Chapter 29, listing of "land of Robert Bastard" (Terra Roberti Bastardi) in Devonshire

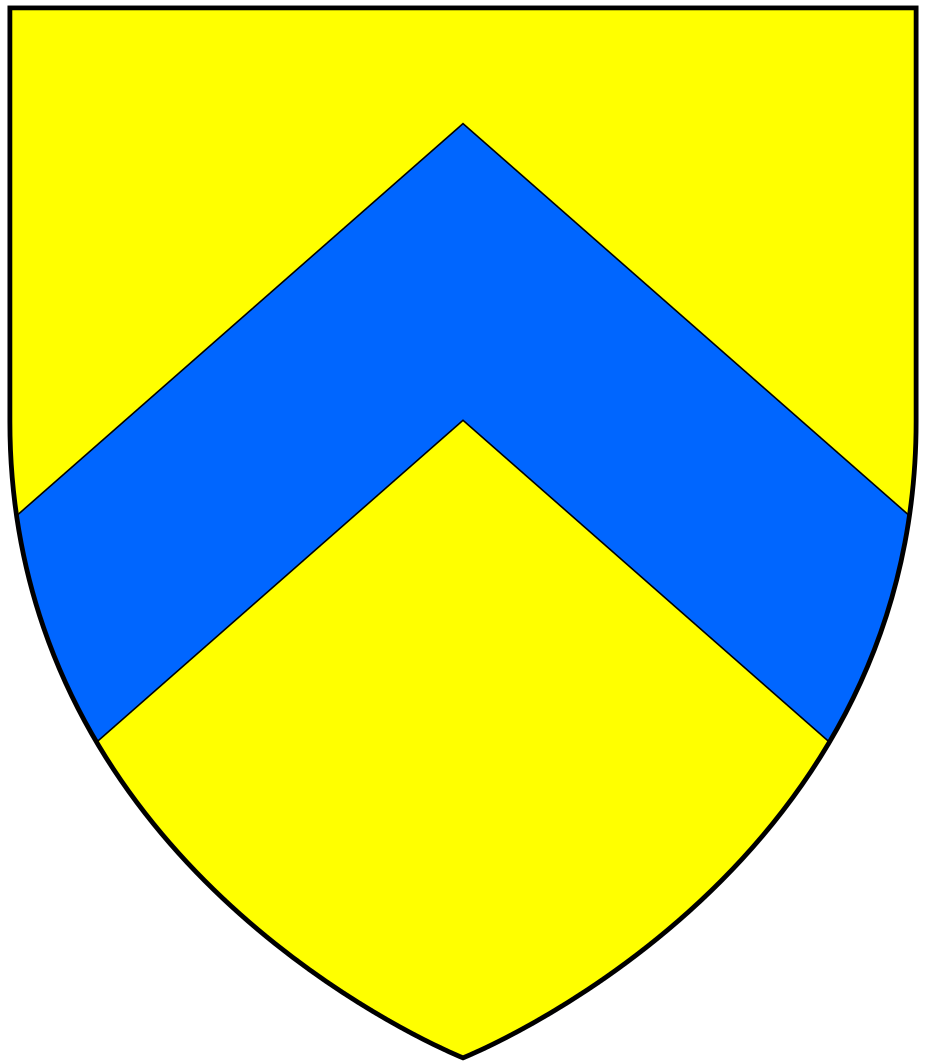
Arms of Bastard, adopted at the start of the age of heraldry (c.1200–1215): Or, a chevron azure

Robert Bastard (fl.1086) (also known as Robert le Bastard, Latinised as Rotbertus / Robertus Bastardus) was a Norman warrior who assisted in the 1066 Norman Conquest of England under King William the Conqueror. He was subsequently rewarded with landholdings in Devonshire and is one of the Devon Domesday Book tenants-in-chief of that monarch, with a holding of 10 manors or estates held in chief, 8 of which he held in demesne, i.e. under his own management without tenants. He had at least one further holding as a mesne tenant, at Goosewell, Plymstock parish, Plympton hundred, held from William of Poilley, a Norman tenant-in-chief from Poilley in Normandy, most of whose 21 landholdings were later granted by King Henry I (1100–1135) to his trusted supporter Richard de Redvers (died 1107), feudal baron of Plympton in Devon.

The last 5 of Robert's holdings in-chief listed in the Domesday Book had all been held by the Saxon Alwin before the Norman Conquest. Soon after 1086 Robert's overlord became Richard I de Redvers, feudal baron of Plympton, the king having granted him large estates in Devon and elsewhere, thus Robert Bastard was in effect demoted from the high status of a tenant-in-chief.

His origins are unknown but he is assumed to have been a Norman. His one tenancy from William of Poilley, a Norman tenant-in-chief from Poilley, appears to be his only recorded connection to any locality in Normandy. His surname "Bastard" indicates that, like his duke and king William the Bastard, he was of illegitimate birth.

== Holdings in-chief ==
His holdings in-chief were as follows, in order of listing in the Domesday Book:

- Backstone, in Rackenford parish, Witheridge hundred; held in demesne; before the Norman Conquest held by the Saxon Aelfric;
- Hazard, Harberton parish, Stanborough hundred (later Coleridge hundred); held in demesne; before the Norman Conquest held by the Saxon Aelfric;
- Combe Royal, Churchstow parish, Stanborough hundred; Robert's tenant was Osbern; before the Norman Conquest held by the Saxon Aelfric;
- Dunstone, Ermington hundred, later in Yealmpton parish, Plympton hundred; Robert's tenant was Ranulf; before the Norman Conquest held by the Saxon Alwy;
- Blachford, Cornwood parish, Ermington hundred; held in demesne; before the Norman Conquest held by the Saxon Alwin;
- Efford, Eggbuckland parish, Roborough hundred; held in demesne; before the Norman Conquest held by the Saxon Alwin;
- Stonehouse, St Andrew's parish, Plympton, Roborough hundred; held in demesne; before the Norman Conquest held by the Saxon Alwin;
- Bickford, Plympton St Mary parish, Plympton hundred; held in demesne; before the Norman Conquest held by the Saxon Alwin;
- Meavy, Roborough hundred; held in demesne; before the Norman Conquest held by the Saxon Alwin;
- Land of St Peter's Church in Plympton, Plympton hundred; the land contained 2 villeins returning an income of 5 shillings; held in demesne; before the Norman Conquest held by the Saxon Alwin.

== Holding as mesne tenant ==
- Goosewell, Plymstock parish, Plympton hundred, held from William of Poilley, a Norman tenant-in-chief from Poilley in Normandy, whose lands were later granted to Richard I de Redvers, feudal baron of Plympton.

== Succession ==
Robert Bastard is extremely unusual not only in having founded an English family which is said to continue in the male line to the present day (although the heraldic visitations pedigree does not show an unbroken line of succession, with the whole of the 15th century unaccounted for), but also one which retained possession of several of his Domesday Book estates for many centuries, most notably the Bastard family's seat at Efford held until the death of Sir Baldwin Bastard in 1345, during the reign of King Edward III (1327–1377). In the Book of Fees (c.1302) Nicholas le Bastard is listed as holding Eppeford (Efford) from the honour of Plympton. By the 16th century the Bastard family had moved to Gerston in the parish of West Alvington, Devon, when it was the seat of William Bastard (d.1638/9) of Gerston, Recorder of Totnes and a Member of Parliament for Dartmouth. In the 18th century the Bastard family moved to Kitley in the parish of Yealmpton, where they remain at the present day, running their manor house as a hotel, making them one of the most ancient of Devonshire gentry families.
