= Robert of Aumale =

Anglo-Norman nobleman

Robert of Aumale (fl. 1086) (alias d'Amarell, Damarell, etc., Latinised to de Albemarle, de Albamara, etc. ) was one of the Devon Domesday Book tenants-in-chief of King William the Conqueror (1066–1087). His lands, comprising 17 entries in the Domesday Book of 1086, later formed part of the very large Feudal barony of Plympton, whose later barons were the Courtenay family, Earls of Devon.

== Origins ==
He was lord of Aumale in Normandy, now in the département of Seine-Maritime, France.

== Descendants ==
Various junior branches of the Damarell family split off to establish separate families, most notably at Milton Damarell; at Damarell in the parish of North Huish; at Woodbury and at Aveton Giffard. Sir William Pole (d.1635) wrote that in his time "Theire is remayning on of this name, of meane quality".
