= Bagtor =

Historic estate in Devon, England

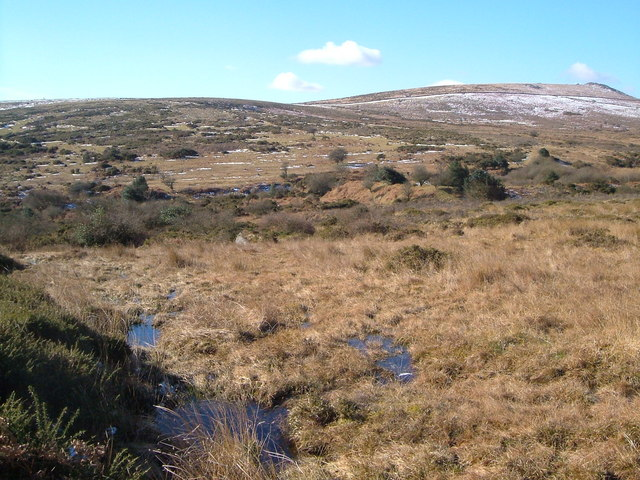
Bagtor Down, Dartmoor, environs of Bagtor House

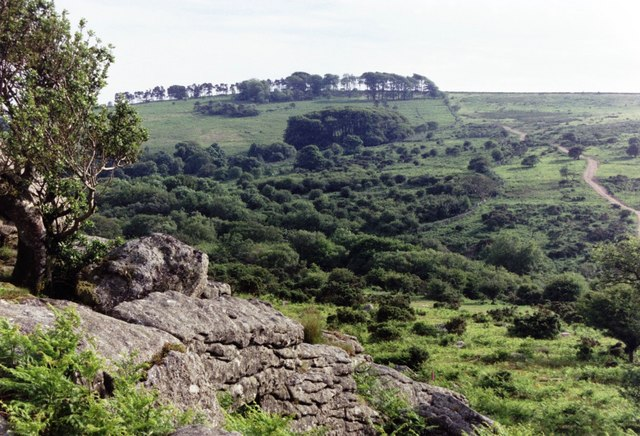
"Bag Tor", the natural rock formation after which the estate is named

Bagtor is a historic estate in the parish of Ilsington in Devon, England. It was the birthplace of John Ford (1586-c. 1639) the playwright and poet. The Elizabethan mansion of the Ford family survives today at Bagtor as the service wing of a later house appended in about 1700.

== Descent ==
=== Early records ===
The manor of Bagetore is listed in the Domesday Book of 1086 as the seventh of the twelve Devonshire holdings of Nicholas the Bowman, one of the 52 Devon Domesday Book tenants-in-chief of King William the Conqueror. His tenant was a certain Roger, and before the Norman Conquest of 1066, it was held by a Saxon named Ordric, who had held six of the manors later obtained by Nicholas the Bowman.

The earliest holder of the manor of Bagtor recorded by the Devonshire historian Sir William Pole (d.1635) is the de Bagtor family. In the Book of Fees (c. 1302) it is recorded as held from the feudal barony of Plympton by "William de Baggetorre", who also held Aller in Abbot's Kerswell, also a former holding of Nicholas the Bowman. According to Pole, it was subsequently held by the Beare family.

=== Ford ===
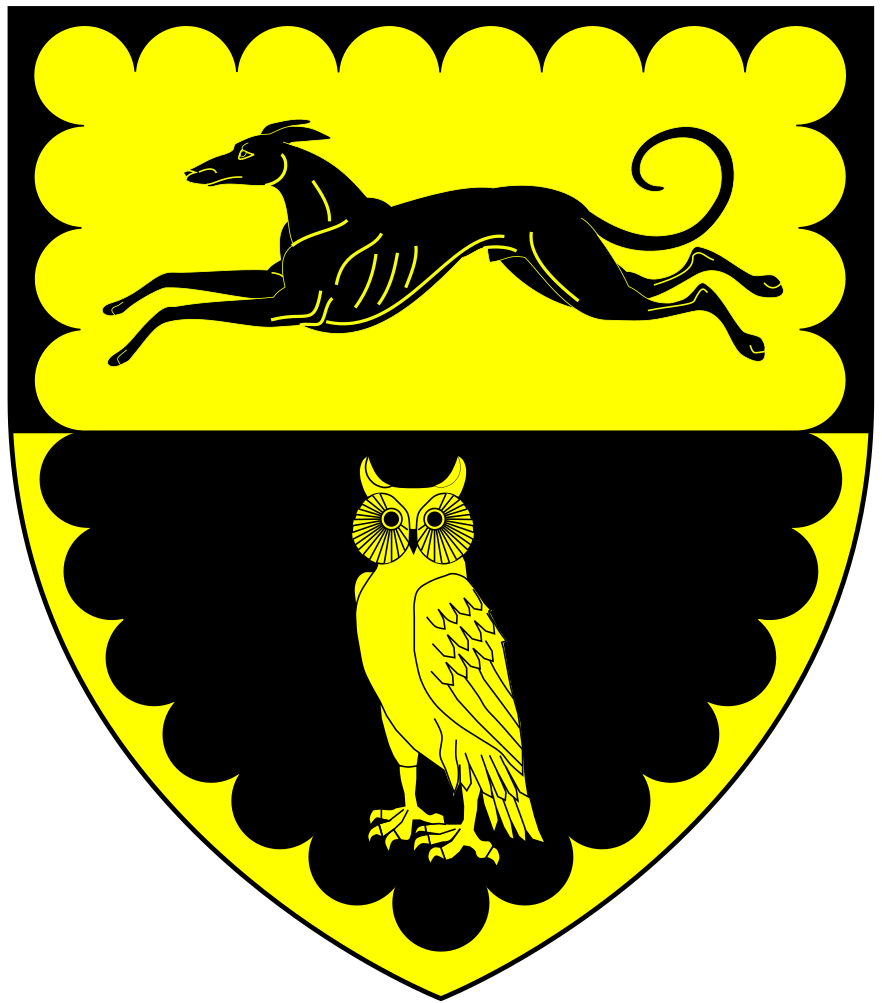
Arms of Ford of Bagtor: Party per fesse or and sable, in chief a greyhound courant in base an owl within a bordure engrailed all counter-changed

- John Ford (died 1538) of Ashburton (the son and heir of William Ford of Chagford) purchased the estate of Bagtor. The Devonshire biographer John Prince supposes him to have been descended from the Fords of Fordmore, in Moreton Hampsted, settled there as early as the 12th century. He married three times, secondly to Joane Walrond, a daughter of William Walrond of Bovey in the parish of Beer, by whom he had issue:
  - George Forde (1521-1570) of Bagtor, son and heir (see below);
  - Margaret Ford, wife of John Rolle (1522–1570) of Stevenstone.
- George Forde (1521-1570) of Bagtor, son and heir, who married Joan St Cleere, a daughter of Gilbert St Cleere of Budleigh.
- Thomas Ford (1556–1610) of Bagtor, eldest son and heir, who married Elizabeth Popham (d.1629) of the Popham family of Huntworth in Somerset. Her monument survives in Ilsington Church. His second son was John Ford (1586-c. 1639) the playwright and poet.
- Henry Ford (d.1616), eldest son and heir, who married Katharine Drake, daughter and sole heiress of George Drake of Spratshays in Littleham, Devon. He was buried at Littleham. His younger son Edward Ford (1596-1665) continued the Ford line at Ilsington, and was the father of John Ford (1632-1677) of Dartington, supposed by Lysons to have been the last in the line seated at Bagtor. Henry Ford's eldest son Sir Henry Ford (1617-1684) moved to the estate of Nutwell.
- Sir Henry Ford (1617-1684), of Nutwell in Devon, eldest son of and heir, four times an MP for Tiverton, Devon, between 1664 and 1685 and twice Secretary to the Lord Lieutenant of Ireland, 1669–70 and 1672–73.

=== Later owners ===
Rev. Thomas Tothill resided at Bagtor. His daughter and heiress Penelope Tothill married Thomas Lane of Bradley, Newton Abbot; of Coffleet in Yealmpton and of Spridleston, all in Devon, Sheriff of Devon in 1784. (See Spridleston).

Bagtor was later part of the large Dartmoor estate of John Dunning, 1st Baron Ashburton (1731–1783), whose seat was at Spitchwick, about 6 miles to the south-west.
