= John Blackall =

English physician

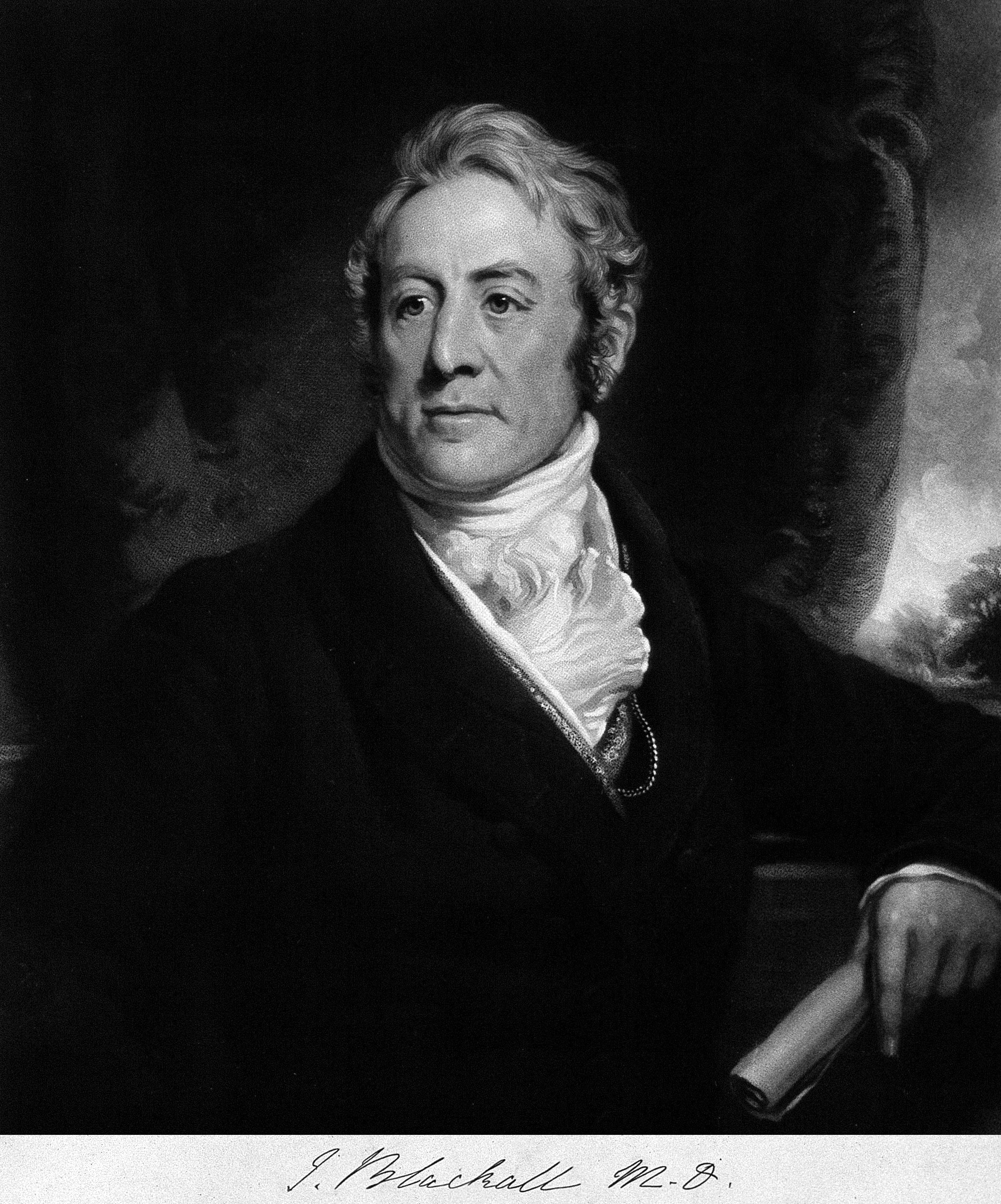

John Blackall (24 December 1771 – 10 January 1860) was an English physician.

== Early life ==
John Blackall was the sixth son of the Reverend Theophilus Blackall, a prebendary of Exeter Cathedral, by his wife Elizabeth Ley, and grandson of Bishop Ofspring Blackall, was born in St. Paul's Street, Exeter on 24 December 1771. He was educated at Exeter grammar school, and then studied at Balliol College, Oxford, as a member of which he graduated B.A. in 1793, M.A. in 1796, M.B. in 1797, and M.D. on 2 March 1801.

== Career ==
Immediately after taking his first degree he applied himself to the study of medicine at St Bartholomew's Hospital, and it was in its wards, while working as the clinical clerk of Dr. John Latham, that he made the observations on albuminuria which were afterwards stated and enlarged in his treatise on dropsies. In 1797 he settled in his native city, and on 1 June in that year was chosen physician to the Devon and Exeter Hospital. At this period, however, the medical practice of Exeter was engrossed by Dr. Hugh Downman, Dr. Bartholomew Parr, and Dr. George Daniell, and in 1801 Dr. Blackall resigned his appointment at Exeter, and settled at Totnes, where he became the physician of the district.

His reputation increased, and in 1807 he returned to Exeter, where he was a second time elected physician to the Devon and Exeter Hospital, and in 1812 was appointed physician to St. Thomas's Lunatic Asylum. In 1813 he published his well-known Observations on the Nature and Cure of Dropsies, London, 8vo, of which there are four editions, and which entitles its author to a position among medical discoverers. Dropsy is the morbid effusion of the serum of the blood into the cavities of the body and into the meshes of its tissues. It had been observed from the beginning of medicine, but up to the time of Richard Lower nothing was known of its morbid anatomy. He made the first step, which was the demonstration that dropsy of a limb always follows direct obstruction of its veins. Blackall's discovery came next, and was that dropsy is often associated with the presence of albumen in the urine. His treatise states clearly the relation between albuminuria and dropsy, and shows that he suspected that the kidneys were diseased in these cases. The further discovery of Richard Bright in 1836 of the constant relation between renal disease and albuminuria is based upon the observations first made by Blackall.

Blackall also published in 1813 some observations on angina pectoris, a disease then much discussed, owing to William Heberden's writings upon it. Blackall was admitted candidate of the Royal College of Physicians on 22 December 1814, and a fellow on 22 December 1815. His progress from this period was rapid and uninterrupted, and for a long series of years he had a great practice in the west of England. He was famed for his skill in diagnosis, and it was based upon a thorough method of clinical examination. He used no complicated remedies, was patient in waiting for results, and was justly confident in the conclusions to which he had attained with so much care.

Dr. Blackall retained his strength and faculties to an advanced age, and he did not relinquish private practice till he was eighty. He died at Southernhay, Exeter, on 10 January 1860, and was followed to the grave in the burial-ground of Holy Trinity Church by a large body of relations and friends and the whole of the medical profession resident within the city.

== Family ==
Dr Blackall also had a respected physician son, Thomas Blackall who was also notable for his stewardship of the Spitchwick estate and his building of Dr Blackall's Drive.
