= Efford =

Suburb of Plymouth, Devon

- Location within Devon
- Population: 14,092 (2011)
- Unitary authority: Plymouth
- Ceremonial county: Devon
- Region: South West
- Country: England
- Sovereign state: United Kingdom
- Post town: Plymouth
- Postcode district: PL3
- Dialling code: 01752
- Police: Devon and Cornwall
- Fire: Devon and Somerset
- Ambulance: South Western
- UK Parliament: Plymouth, Sutton and Devonport

Efford (anciently Eppeford, Elforde, etc.) is an historic manor formerly in the parish of Eggbuckland, Devon, England. Today it has been absorbed by the city of Plymouth to become a large, mostly post-World War II, eastern suburb of the city. It stands on high ground approximately 300 feet above the Laira estuary of the River Plym and provides views over long distances: to the north across Dartmoor, to the east and south-east across the South Hams. It consists predominantly of local authority and housing association properties. Before this land was built upon it was known as 'The Wilds of Efford', and was largely unspoilt countryside and marsh land. That a deer park may have been attached to the manor is suggested by the survival of the street name "Deer Park Drive".

== Etymology ==
The former manor is situated on land sloping down towards the River Plym and it was suggested by the Devon historian Tristram Risdon (d.1640) that its ancient name was Ebbing-Ford "of a passage through the River Plym by which it lieth". A ford existed here by which travellers could cross the river at ebb tide, hence "Ebb-Ford". Today much of the river has silted up and has been reclaimed and built-upon.

== History ==
=== Bastard ===
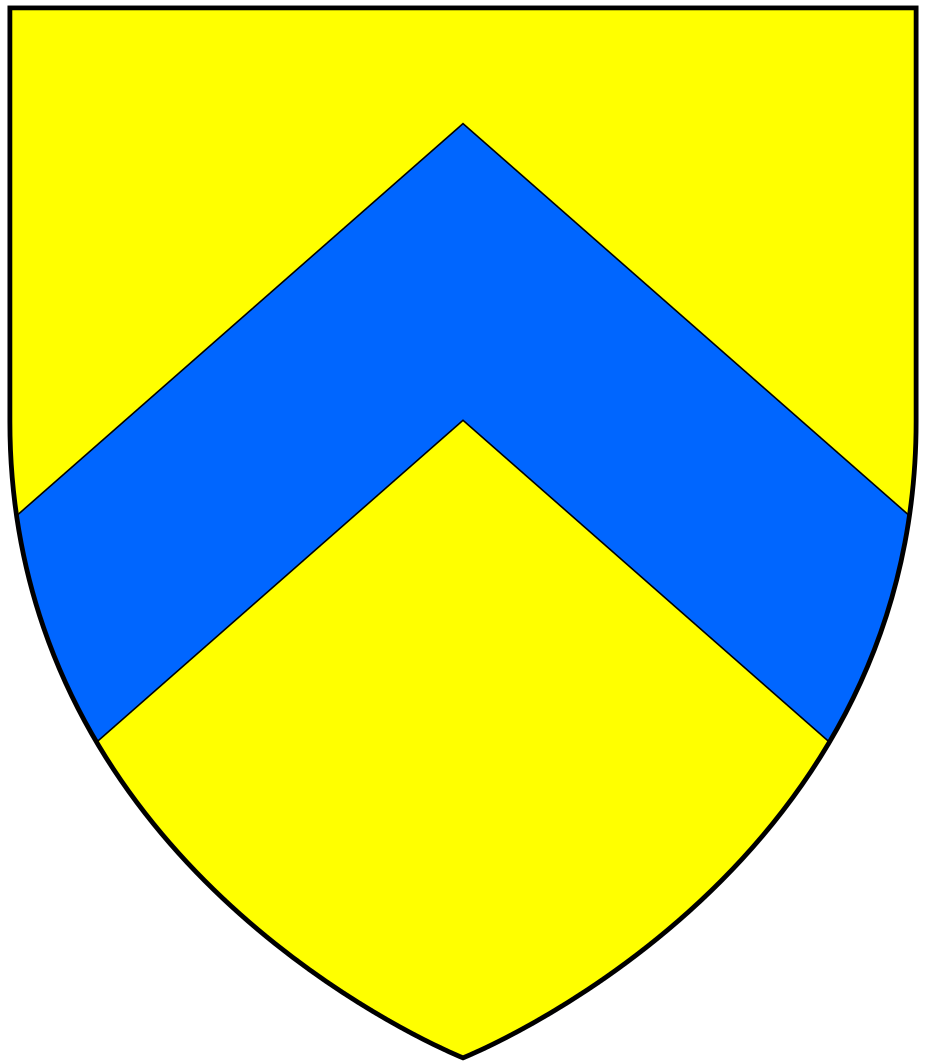
Arms of Bastard, adopted at the start of the age of heraldry (c.1200–1215): Or, a chevron azure

It is listed in the Domesday Book of 1086 as Elforde, the 6th of the 10 Devonshire holdings of Robert Bastard, one of the Devon Domesday Book tenants-in-chief of King William the Conqueror. It included a fishery, which paid tax of 12 pence. Robert held it in demesne, together with Hazard, Blachford, Stonehouse, Bickford and Meavy, all but one of which before the Norman Conquest of 1066 had been held by the Saxon Alwin. His lands later formed part of the feudal barony of Plympton.

The Bastard family continued to hold Efford for several generations, and it served as their principal seat until the death of Sir Baldwin Bastard in 1345, during the reign of King Edward III (1327–1377). In the Book of Fees (c.1302) Nicholas le Bastard is listed as holding Eppeford from the honour of Plympton. By the 16th century the Bastard family had moved to Gerston in the parish of West Alvington, Devon, when it was the seat of William Bastard (d.1638/9) of Gerston, Recorder of Totnes and a Member of Parliament for Dartmouth. In the 18th century the Bastard family moved to Kitley in the parish of Yealmpton, where they remained until after 1937, and at the present day, making them one of the most ancient of Devonshire gentry families.

=== Whitleigh ===
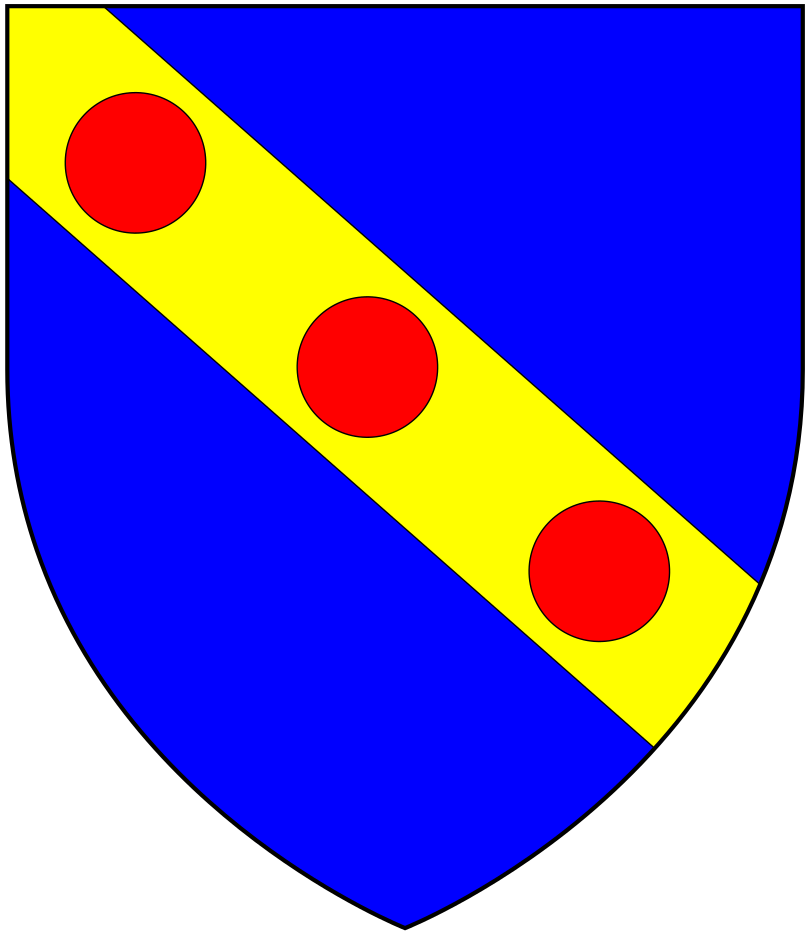
Arms of Whitleigh: Azure, on a bend or three torteaux

In 1345, during the reign of King Edward III (1327–1377), Efford became the property of Roger Whitleigh, who had succeeded (for reason unknown) Sir Baldwin Bastard (d.1345). The Whitleigh family remained seated at Efford for a further six generations, having married three wealthy heiresses, Mabel Esse, daughter and heiress of Humphrey Esse; Joan Winard, daughter and heiress of Robert Winard; and Isabel Reprin, daughter and heiress of Richard Reprin. The last in the male line was Richard II Whitleigh, grandson of John Whitleigh and Isabel Reprin, who left two daughters and co-heiresses:

- Margaret Whitleigh, wife of Sir Roger Grenville (1477–1523), lord of the manor of Bideford in Devon, and of Stowe, Kilkhampton in Cornwall, Sheriff of Cornwall in 1510–11, 1517–18, 1522, ancestor of John Grenville, 1st Earl of Bath (1628–1701). His second son was John Grenville (c. 1506 – c. 1562), three times MP for Exeter, in 1545, 1554 and 1558.
- Joan Whitleigh, whose portion was Efford, wife of Richard III Hals of Kenedon in the parish of Sherford, Devon.

=== Hals ===
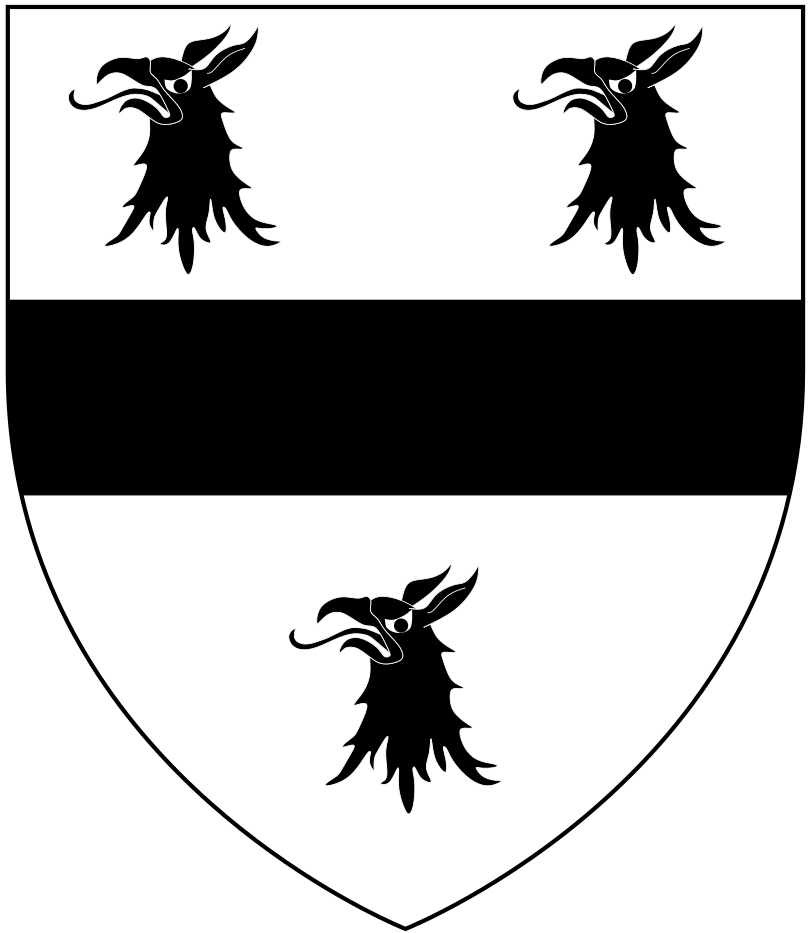
Arms of Hals of Kenedon: Argent, a fess between three griffin's heads erased sable

Richard III Hals, who married Jone Whitleigh the heiress of Efford, was a great-grandson of John Hals (fl.1423) of Kenedon (son of John Hals of Lavant in Cornwall), a Justice of the Common Pleas and in 1423 a Justice of the King's Bench. The judge's second son was John Hales (c. 1400–1490), Bishop of Coventry and Lichfield (1459-1490). The Bishop's great-uncle was Richard Hals (d.1418), a Canon of Exeter Cathedral in Devon, and Treasurer of Exeter Cathedral in 1400, who in 1414 was sent as Ambassador to Brittany. The Hals family moved their seat from Kenedon to Efford, but retained ownership of their former seat. In St Edward's Church, the parish church of Egg Buckland, is the monument of Edmund Hals (d.1678/9), second son of Matthew I Hals (d.1656). The last in the male line was Matthew III Halse (1657/8–1684) of Efford (eldest son of Matthew II Hals (d.1675/6), son of Matthew I Hals), who died in 1684 without surviving male progeny, and having been "so far imposed upon" (Prince) by his uncle, Rev. Richard Hals of Philleigh in Cornwall, his nearest male relative and heir presumptive, he decided to disinherit him, in "disregard of feudal claims". ("Which excite(d) so much indignation in (Prince)" (Ed. of Prince),). Instead he bequeathed the Hals estates to his 4 surviving married sisters, including:

- Rebecca Hals (born 1661), 5th sister, heiress of Efford, wife of Henry Trelawny (c.1658–1702) of Whitleigh, Member of Parliament and Vice-Admiral of Cornwall.
- Amy Hals (born 1665), 6th sister, heiress of Kenedon, wife of Jonathan Elford of Bickham.

=== Trelawny ===
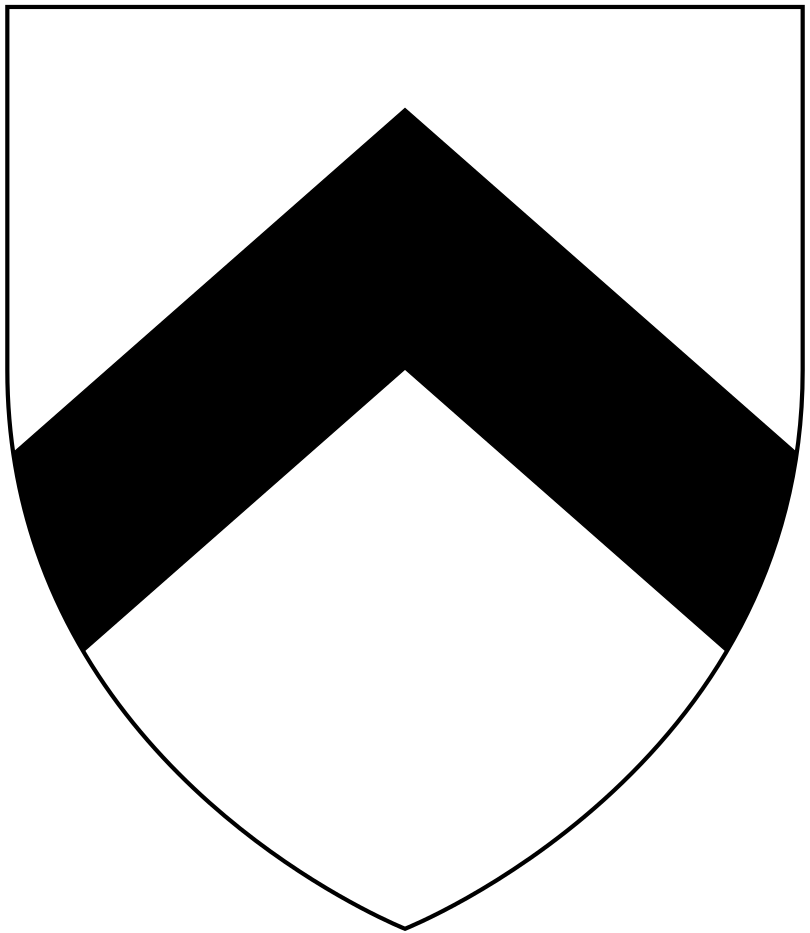
Arms of Trelawny: Argent, a chevron sable

Henry Trelawny (c.1658–1702) of Whitleigh, who married Rebecca Hals heiress of Efford, was a Member of Parliament and Vice-Admiral of Cornwall. He was the 7th son of Sir Jonathan Trelawny, 2nd Baronet (c.1623–1681) of Trelawny in the parish of Pelynt in Cornwall. His son by Rebecca Hals was Sir Harry Trelawny, 5th Baronet (1687–1762), an aide-de-camp to the Duke of Marlborough and Member of Parliament. The Trelawny family retained Efford until 1784, when Rev. Sir Harry Trelawny, 7th Baronet (1756–1834) sold it to William Clarke of Plymouth.

=== Clarke ===
William Clarke (d. pre-1822) of Plymouth purchased Efford in 1784, and his grandchildren were the owners in 1810. The owner in 1822 was Irwin Clarke, when the manor house of Great Efford was let to a farmer and an adjoining cottage was occasionally inhabited by the Clarke family. Little Efford was then the property of Mrs. Culme, and in the occupation of Edward Williams. An "Abstract of title of the trustees under the will of William Clark to the manor of Efford, Eggbuckland" dated 1867 survives in the Plymouth and West Devon Record Office.

=== 19th century ===
Historically the area around Efford had military importance. Efford Fort (at 50°23′26″N 4°5′32″W) was one of the ring of Victorian Palmerston's Follies built to provide defence from risk of French invasion.

=== 20th century ===
The area was heavily occupied by the American army during the preparations for D-Day. This is memorialised by the naming of a part of Efford as Little America, where an estate of American-supplied pre-fabricated houses was built from 1945 onwards. Streets there were given names such as California Gardens, Oregon Way, etc. These names were retained when the estate was demolished and replaced by modern houses in the 1970s.

In the late 20th century the manor house of Little Efford and the adjoining cottages were sold to the Traynor Family of Plymouth who converted the house into apartments.

== Efford Cemetery ==
A municipal cemetery for Plymouth city, initially 37 acres, was laid out at Efford from 1904 and opened in 1907. It is still in use. Amongst burials are:

- 338 scattered Commonwealth service war graves of World War I, including ten New Zealand soldiers killed by the Bere Ferrers rail accident (1917), and eight members of the Chinese Labour Corps (the largest such number buried in England).
- 109 Commonwealth service war graves of World War II, including five unidentified men, scattered apart from a small group in Section C.
- 12 foreign national war graves of World War II, mainly Greek merchant seamen.
- Mass burials of victims of the Plymouth Blitzes of April and May 1941, including those of an air raid shelter disaster at Portland Square.
- Reburials from disused burial grounds at Charles Street Quaker Burial Ground, St Andrew's Church, Plymouth and Charles Church, Plymouth.

In 1934 Plymouth's City Crematorium was opened within the cemetery. Among those cremated there were:

- 61 Commonwealth service personnel of World War II, who are commemorated on a Screen Wall memorial set in a hedge behind the Cross of Sacrifice.
- James Bulmer Johnson (1889–1943), army VC winner of World War I.
- John Bromley (1876–1945), former Labour Member of Parliament and General Secretary of trade union ASLEF.
