= Woollaton =

Village in Devon, England

Coordinates: 50°53′43″N 4°10′13″W

- Location within Devon
- OS grid reference: SS4712
- Shire county: Devon
- Region: South West
- Country: England
- Sovereign state: United Kingdom
- Police: Devon and Cornwall
- Fire: Devon and Somerset
- Ambulance: South Western

Woollaton is a hamlet in Devon, England.
