= Aylestone Park =

Aylestone Park may refer to:

- See Aylestone for Aylestone Park, Leicester, a housing estate, and Aylestone Meadows
- Aylestone Park F.C., Leicester
