= Alfred the Breton =

Anglo-Breton landowner

Alfred the Breton (fl. 1086) (Latinized to Alvred Brito) was one of the Devon Domesday Book tenants-in-chief of King William the Conqueror. He had 22 landholdings in the county of Devonshire held in-chief according to the Domesday Book of 1086, and held further lands as a mesne tenant, including the manor of Panson in the parish of St Giles-in-the-Heath. His manors later descended to the feudal barony of Plympton.
