= Dr Blackall's Drive =

Scenic carriage drive built as a folly by Thomas Blackall

Coordinates: 50.531686°N 3.834580°W

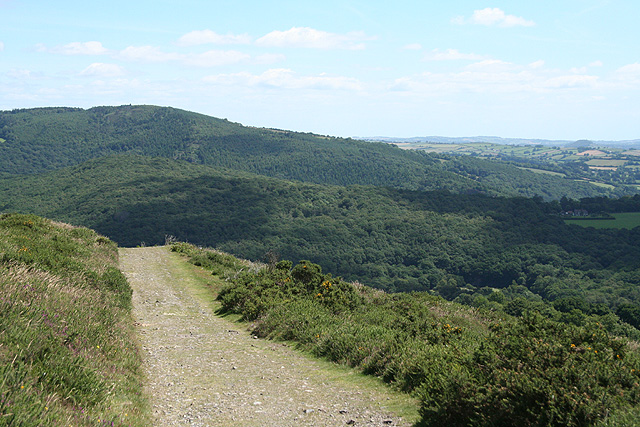
- Dr Blackall's drive looking down to the River Dart

Route information
- Established by Dr Thomas Blackall
- Length: 2 mi (3.2 km)
- Time period: Victorian
- Restrictions: Recreational route

Location
- Country: United Kingdom
- Constituent country: England

Road network
- Roads in the United Kingdom; Motorways; A and B road zones

Dr Blackall's Drive is a track built along the hill above the River Dart, near the hamlet of Poundsgate, in the parish of Widecombe-in-the-Moor, Devon. It was built by and named after Dr Thomas Blackall, a notable physician in Exeter, who owned the nearby Spitchwick estate, which he bought with his considerable inheritance from his father, also a notable physician John Blackall.

== History ==
Dr Thomas Blackall was a successful doctor who lived at Maryfield in Pennsylvania, Exeter. Following the death of his father in 1860, he used his inheritance to purchase the manor of Spitchwick in 1867, as a country retreat, whilst he continued to primarily live in Exeter.

He made a number of improvements to the estate and its over 2,200 acres of land, and during the 1880s he instructed a Gerald Warren to construct a scenic drive where he could take his carriage to best show off the beauty of the Dart valley for himself and his guests, making this amongst the earliest examples of a scenic drive.

== The track ==
The track was specifically designed for traversing by horse-drawn carriage, and is only about 8 feet (2.4 m) wide at the widest point.

It was designed as a scenic route, and runs from near Spitchwick manor house up to what is now the Bel Tor car park, shadowing the road to the North which passes through Poundsgate.

Guide books have described the route of being of "singular beauty", and organised trips have been taken here since the 19th century, and throughout the time since.

The track featured in the Great Western Railway guidebook to Devon in 1906 as "not to be missed", and since then has featured in dozens of guidebooks, including Time Out, the Good Britain Guide, and Which?.

It climbs from an elevation of 682 feet (208 m) near the manor to 1,141 feet (348 m) at the top.

The track mostly falls within access land under the Countryside and Rights of Way Act 2000, except for a small section which is a designated bridleway where it leaves the access land. The route is marked as a "recreational route" on Ordnance Survey maps.
