= Ilsington =

Village and civil parish in Devon, England

- Parish
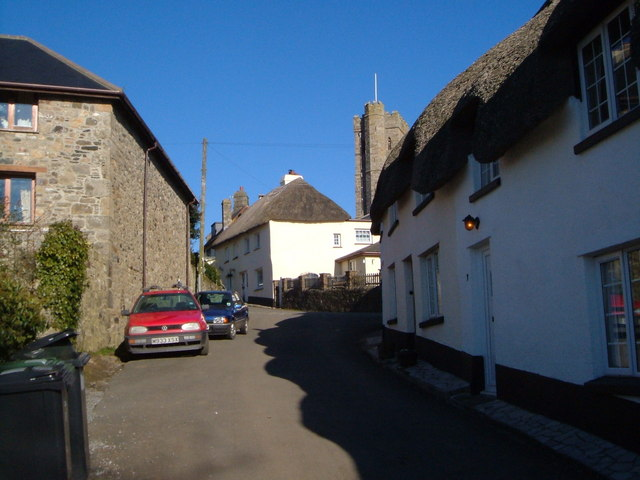
- The village of Ilsington

- Location within Devon Location within the United Kingdom
- Coordinates: 50°34′19″N 3°43′00″W
- Country: England
- County: Devon
- District: Teignbridge
- Civil parish: Ilsington

Government
  - Body: Ilsington Parish Council

Population (2001)
  - Total: 2,444
- Time zone: UTC+0:00 (GST)

Ilsington is a village and civil parish situated on the eastern edge of Dartmoor, in the Teignbridge district, in the county of Devon, England. It is one of the largest parishes in the county, and includes the villages of Ilsington, Haytor Vale, Liverton and South Knighton. The parish is surrounded, clockwise from the north, by the parishes of Bovey Tracey, Teigngrace (a short border only), Newton Abbot, Ogwell (another short border), Bickington, Ashburton, Widecombe in the Moor and Manaton. In 2001 the population of the parish was 2,444, greatly increased from the 886 residents recorded in 1901. The parish is represented in parliament by Mel Stride, as part of the Central Devon constituency.

== History ==
The village is believed to be an ancient settlement, probably existing 200 to 300 years before the Norman Conquest. It is mentioned in the Domesday Book of 1086 as Ilestintona, and there is known to have been a church there since at least the 11th century. St. Michael's parish church, as seen today, dates back to the 15th century. It was the site of an incident which has passed into local folklore: in 1639, the schoolroom, which was above the west lychgate of the church, collapsed into the street and churchyard.

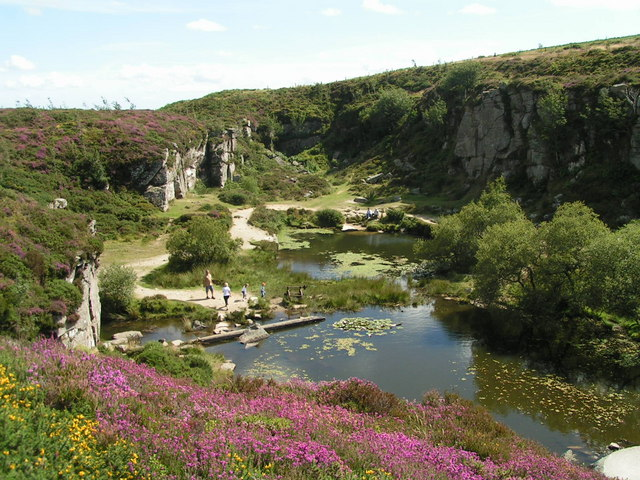
The Haytor quarries

Apart from its agricultural history, Ilsington's industrial archaeology reflects the mining of the 18th and 19th centuries. The Atlas tin mine and the Smallacombe iron mine were major local enterprises – with the cottages at Lewthorne Cross being built for William Grose, the mine captain and mine workers. Nearby, at Haytor, granite was quarried and carried down to the Stover Canal at Ventiford, Teigngrace, on the Haytor Granite Tramway, the route of which is now commemorated in the Templer Way footpath. Haytor granite was used in the building of many civic structures including London Bridge, over the Thames in London.

Through the centuries, Ilsington village appears to have been largely self-supporting. Census returns and church records show a variety of rural occupations among the local community including farmers, blacksmiths, carpenters, thatchers and stone workers. It had an ancient manor house which fell into ruin after occupation ceased in about 1825. The village's most famous resident was the playwright John Ford, who was born at Bagtor House in 1586.

== Today ==
Today, the village has a pub (The Carpenters Arms); a hotel (The Ilsington Hotel); and a village shop (Ilsington Village Shop), a non-profit shop where the villagers work voluntary shifts throughout the week. Nearby Haytor Vale has the Rock Inn, and Liverton has two pubs, The Star and The Welcome Stranger. There are two schools in the parish: Blackpool School and Ilsington Primary School. Comedian Josh Widdicombe attended the latter after his family relocated from London.

The Book of Ilsington: A Photographic History of the Parish (2000) was written by Dick Wills, who lived in the parish all his life, and was the 14th generation of the Wills family to live and farm at Narracombe. He died shortly after the publication of the book. The politician Ann Widdecombe lived in Haytor Vale, at a house she bought in 2008, until her death in July 2026, which triggered a murder investigation.

Liverton United F.C. play in Division 3 South Devon Football League, and Ilsington Villa A.F.C. play in the Premier Division South Devon Football League.

== Governance ==
Ilsington is governed locally by the Ilsington Parish Council. It also has representation on the Teignbridge District Council.

== See also ==
- Frederick Campling
- Ann Widdecombe, resident of Haytor Vale and Conservative politician
