= Ailstone =

Coordinates: 52.14°N 01.70°W

- Location within Warwickshire
- OS grid reference: SP2050
- Shire county: Warwickshire
- Region: West Midlands
- Country: England
- Sovereign state: United Kingdom
- Post town: Stratford-upon-Avon
- Postcode district: CV37
- Police: Warwickshire
- Fire: Warwickshire
- Ambulance: West Midlands

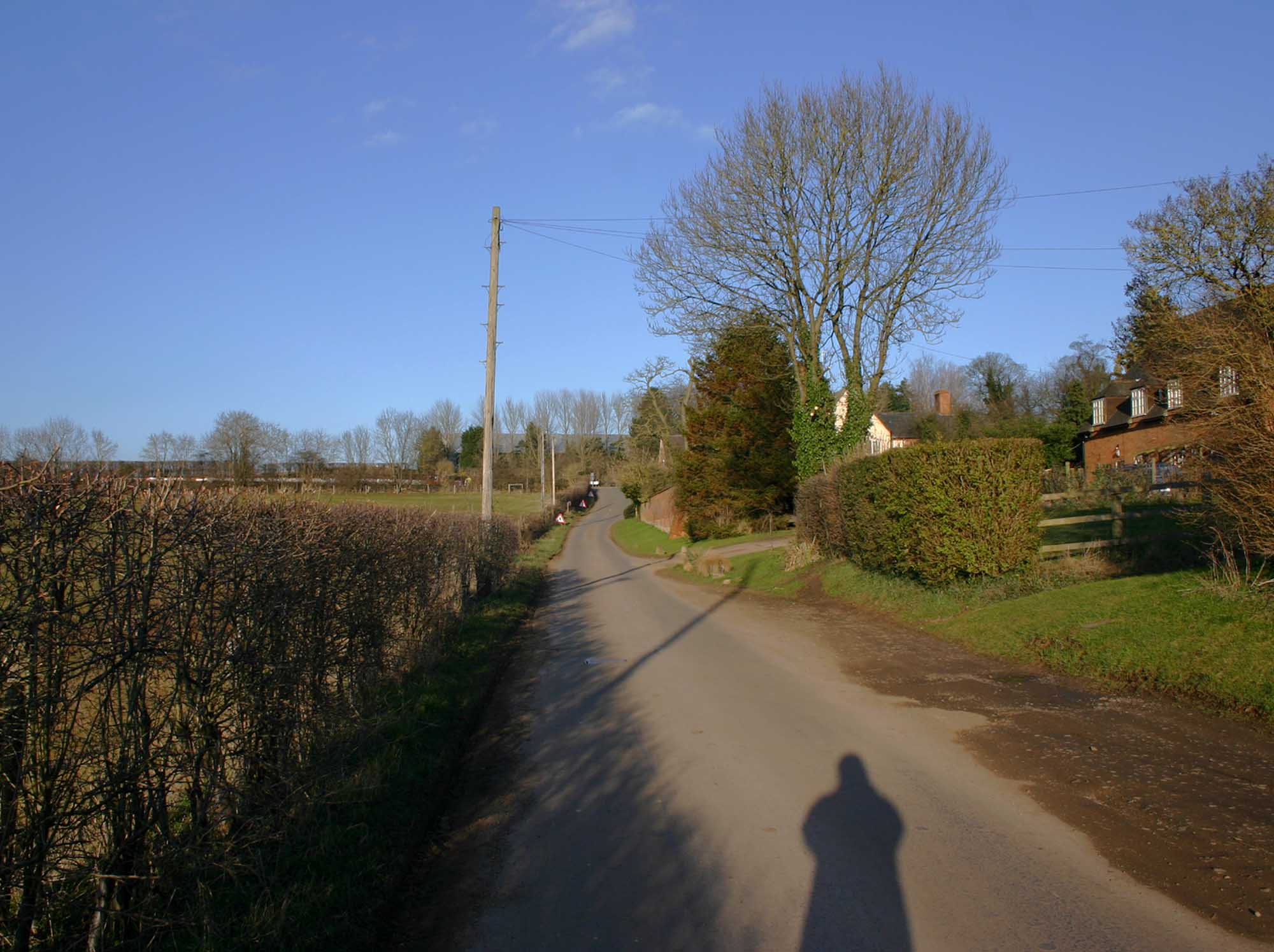
Ailstone in March 2010

Ailstone is a village in Warwickshire, England. Population details can be found under Preston-on-Stour
