= Capetian House of Courtenay =

Cadet branch of the Capetian dynasty

House of Courtenay
- Arms of the Capetian House of Courtenay
- Parent house: Capetian dynasty (agnatic); House of Courtenay (cognatic)
- Country: Latin Empire, France
- Founded: c. 1150; 876 years ago
- Founder: Peter I of Courtenay
- Titles: Latin Emperor of Constantinople; Prince of the blood (claim); Margrave of Namur; Count of Nevers; Count of Auxerre; Count of Tonnerre; Lord of Courtenay
- Dissolution: 1733; 293 years ago
- Cadet branches: House of Courtenay-Champignelles

The Capetian House of Courtenay, also known simply as the House of Courtenay, was a royal house and cadet branch of the Capetian dynasty. Founded by Peter I of Courtenay, a son of King Louis VI of France, the family drew its name from the lordship of Courtenay, to which Peter's wife was heiress.

== Capetian house of Courtenay ==
The marriage of Peter I of Courtenay, also known as Peter of France, with Elizabeth, heiress of the elder branch of the lords of Courtenay, took place in 1150. They had four sons, Phillip (1153 – before 1186) who didn't have a child, Peter II of Courtenay whose agnatic descendants died out in 1283 by the death Philip I, Latin Emperor, Robert of Courtenay whose agnatic descendants died out in 1733, and William, Seigneur of Tanlay whose agnatic descendants died out in 1384.

== The elder branch ==
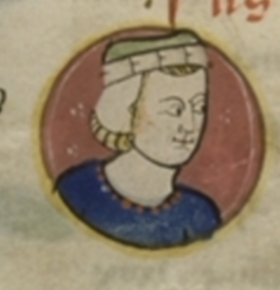
Peter II of Courtenay

Peter II of Courtenay (eldest son of Peter of France, Lord of Courtenay and Elizabeth) became Count of Auxerre, Nevers and Tonnerre by his marriage with the Countess Agnes of Nevers. After the death of his first wife, he married Yolanda of Flanders. In 1216, on the death of his wife's brother, the Latin Emperor of Constantinople Henry of Flanders, the barons of Constantinople chose Peter II of Courtenay to succeed him; but he was captured while attempting to reach Constantinople and died in captivity in 1219.

His son, Robert of Courtenay, attempted to keep the empire by selling their possessions (including the Marquisate of Namur). The Emperor Robert was expelled from Constantinople by his subjects in 1228. His brother and successor Baldwin II of Constantinople lost the crown when Constantinople was taken by the Greeks (1261), and died in exile in Italy in 1273. His granddaughter, Catherine of Courtenay, married in 1300 Charles of Valois, son of Philip III of France, and the lands of the Courtenay passed into the House of France.

== The younger branch ==
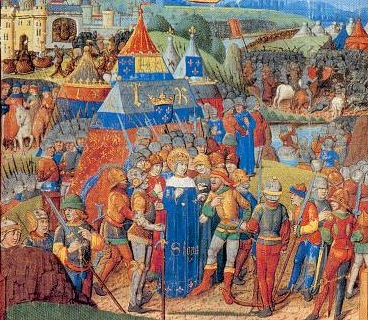
Battle of Mansurah (1250), King Louis IX of France with the Knights Templars against the forces of Sultana Shajar al-Durr, in present-day Egypt

Robert, the second son of Peter of France and Elizabeth of Courtenay, received some lordships, including that of Champignelles. One of his sons, Peter of Courtenay, Lord of Conches, accompanied Saint Louis in the Holy Land during the Seventh Crusade; he was killed at the Battle of Mansurah (1250), along with the king's brother, Robert I, Count of Artois. His only daughter Amicie de Courtenay married Robert II, Count of Artois, the son of Robert of Artois. In 1285, Robert II of Courtenay, Lord of Champignelles (grandson of Robert) became the head of the House of Courtenay at the death of Philip of Courtenay, son of the Emperor Baldwin II Courtenay.

After the extinction of the members of the senior branch, the Courtenay family fell into oblivion. They had become minor provincial lords, since the elder branch had sold most of the family's possessions in their attempt to preserve the Latin Empire in the east. One of the descendants of Robert de Courtenay, John III of Courtenay-Champignelles, was taken prisoner by the English at the Battle of Poitiers in 1356, and later he fought alongside Bertrand du Guesclin. His nephew Peter III of Courtenay-Champignelles became chamberlain and advisor to King Charles VI. Another member of the family, François de Courtenay-Bléneau is knighted at Marignan (1515), and Anne de Courtenay, another descendant of Robert, in 1583 became the first wife of Maximilien de Béthune, Duke of Sully.

The title of Head of the House of Courtenay is transmitted over time from one branch to another, in 1472 to John II of Courtenay, Lord of Bléneau, then in 1655 to Louis de Courtenay, Lord of Chevillon. From 1603, they tried in vain to gain recognition, many times, the status of "princes of royal blood." The last male of the final branch died in 1733, and the family was extinguished on June 29, 1768, with the death of his niece, Helen of Courtenay, Marquise of Bauffremont (1689–1768).

== The claim to princely status ==
See also: Claim to French royal status

While the wars in Constantinople were unfortunate to the French in general, its loss was dearer still to the Courtenay family. Having had the honor of an imperial dignity, they had spared no cost in order to preserve it, but found that it could not be kept. The grandeur and wealth of the family was lost, that when the time came for the princes of Capetian lineage to be exalted above others, the Courtenays, who would have been best entitled in more ancient times, could no longer be esteemed princes of the blood in France.

- Louis VI of France
  - Louis VII of France
    - Philip II of France
      - Louis VIII of France
        - Louis IX of France
          - Philip III of France
            - Philip IV of France
            - House of Valois
          - House of Bourbon
  - Peter I of Courtenay House of Courtenay ext. 1733
    - (Pierre II de Courtenay as Count of Nevers, Auxerre, and Tonnerre), Latin Emperors of Constantinople
    - Courtenay-Champignelle
      - Courtenay-Bleneau ext. 1655
      - Courtenay Le Ferté-Loupières ext 1562
        - above w/ a crescent gules, in 17thc. (assumed, not recognized) Courtenay-Chevillon ext. 1733
        - Courtenay-Bontin ext. 1578, Courtenay a crescent azure and a bordure gobony argent and gules
    - Arrablay: Courtenay a crescent azure ext. bef.1540
    - La Ferté-Loupières: Courtenay a label of four points azure ext. 1458
    - Courtenay-Tanlay ext. 1384
    - Courtenay Yerre/Hyères ext. 14thc.

With the establishment of the Salic law in France, the male-line descendants of the third race of the kings of France were recognized as princes of the blood, who had the contingent right of succession to the French crown. Though the House of Courtenay multiplied, they did so in obscurity and poverty. From princes they became barons, and from barons they became rural lords. Compared to the mighty princes of the blood — the dukes of Burgundy, Brittany, Orléans, Anjou, Bourbon, and Alençon — the royal blood seemed like a drop in the lords of Champignelles and Tanlay. Their name had largely disappeared in the history of the kingdom, but might still be found by the patience and diligence of heralds and genealogists. In the 16th century, the accession of the House of Bourbon, itself distantly related to the preceding House of Valois, awoke the princely spirit of the Courtenays. They appealed to the justice and compassion of Henry IV of France; they obtained a favorable opinion of 20 lawyers from Italy and Germany, and compared themselves to the descendants of King David, whose rights were not impaired by the lapse of ages or the trade of a carpenter. But every ear was deaf, and every circumstance was adverse, to their lawful claims. The princes of the blood, more recent and lofty, disdained the alliance of this humble kindred. The parliament, without denying their proofs, eluded them by arbitrarily selecting St. Louis as the progenitor of the royal line. (Note: According to Gibbon, the sainthood of Louis IX could not invest him with any special prerogative, and all the descendants of Hugh Capet must be included in his original compact with the French nation.) A repetition of complaints and protests was repeatedly disregarded; and the hopeless pursuit was terminated in the 18th century by the death of the last male of the family.

== Family Trees ==
Genealogy of the Capetian House of Courtenay - Beginning to Latin Empire

Athon or Hutton (~985- >1000) Châtelain de Châteaurenard, seigneur de Courtenay
Joscelin I (c. 1034-after 1069), seigneur de Courtenay m. 1. Hildegarde de Château-Landon, daughter of Geoffrey II of Gâtinais, and Ermengarde of Anjou (daughter of Fulk III of Anjou), & had a d. From this 2nd wife:
Joscelin I (d. 1131); Count of Edessa, 1118; Prince of Galilee, 1112-1119	Miles de Courtenay (d. after 1145) seigneur de Courtenay m. Ermengarde of Nevers
Joscelin II (died 1159); Count of Edessa, 1131–1144	Louis VI king of France; HOUSE OF CAPET	Renaud de Courtenay (d. 1160) seigneur de Courtenay lost lands in France to Louis VII. Lands went to his son-in-law Peter of France
Agnes (c. 1136 – c. 1184) m.Amalric, King of Jerusalem & Anjou. Her ch. Baldwin IV of Jerusalem the Leper and Sibylla of Jerusalem were monarchs of Jerusalem, as was her grandson Baldwin V of Jerusalem	Joscelin III (c. 1139 – after 1190) titl. Count of Edessa; Seneschal of Jerusalem, (1176–1190) lord of the seigneurie de Joscelin	Louis VII king of France	Peter of France & Courtenay (1126-1183); CAPETIAN HOUSE OF COURTENAY seigneur de Courtenay	Élisabeth de Courtenay (1127-1205), dame de Courtenay	Renaud de Courtenay (d. 1160)	Hawise de Curcy heiress to the English feudal barony of Okehampton, Devon.
Philip II Augustus; King of France	Yolanda of Flanders hieress of Latin Emperors Baldwin I of Flanders and Henry I of Flanders	Peter II of Courtenay (d. late 1217); Latin Emperor of Constantinople, 1216	--> Robert (c. 1168 – 1239); Seigneur de Champignelles	William (1168 – bef. 1248); Seigneur of Tanlay	Robert de Courtenay (d.1242) feudal baron of Okehampton, married Lady Mary de Redvers, d. of William de Redvers, 5th Earl of Devon (d.1217)
Philip II (1195–1226); Marquis of Namur, 1216	Robert of Courtenay d.1228 5th Latin Emperor	Henry II (1206–1229) margrave of Namur, 1226	Baldwin (1217 – 1273); 6th Latin Emperor of Constantinople, 1228–73 (in exile 1261–73); Sold County of Namur, 1256	Peter (c. 1218 – 1249 or 1250 in Egypt); Lord of Conches and Mehun	Guillaume de Courtenay (1228 – 1280), seigneur de Venisy & seigneur de Champignelles	1. Philippe de Courtenay; (1221-1246) seigneur de Champignelles; 2. Raoul I de Courtenay, seigneur d'Illiers (b. 1223 – d. 1271)	3. Robert de Courtenay, seigneur de Danville et Nonancourt (b. 1224 – d. 1279), évêque d'Orléans; 4. Jean I de Courtenay (1226-1271), archevêque de Reims	House of Courtenay in England; Earls of Devon
Philip I titl. Latin Emperor of Constantinople,(1243 – 1283) m. Beatrice of Sicily, daughter of Charles I of Sicily	1re branche de Champignelles	Robert I (1205-1260) seigneur de Tanlay

Genealogy of the Capetian House of Courtenay 2 - Later Courtenays

1re branche de Champignelles from Guillaume (1228-1280) seigneur de Champignelles	branche de Tarlay
Robert (1251-1324) archevêque de Reims	Pierre (1259-1290)	Jean Ier (1265-1318) seigneur de Champignelles	Robert Ier (1205-1260) seigneur de Tanlay	Jean (1220—ap.1248)	Baudouin (1211-ap.1222)
Jean II (1291-1334) seigneur de Champignelles	Philippe (1292-1346) seigneur de La Ferté-Loupière (1re branche)	Robert (1296-1331), moine; -Guillaume (1299-ap.1331), vidame de Reims -Étienne (1305-1348), prêtre	Pierre (1305-1348) seigneur d'Autry	Jean I (1230-1285) seigneur de Tanlay
Jean III (1330-1392) seigneur de Champignelles	Pierre II (1334-1394) seigneur de Champignelles	Jean I (1346-1412) seigneur de la Ferté-Loupière	Robert II (1260-1310) seigneur de Tanlay	Étienne (1262-ap.1332), seigneur de Tanerre	Philippe (1264-1300), seigneur de Ravières	Jean (1266-1300), abbé de Quincey
Pierre III (1377-1411) seigneur de Champignelles et St-Brisson	Jean I (1379-1460) seigneur de Bléneau, héritier entre 1417 et 1455 de la 1re branche de La Ferté-Loupière (see below: Tannerre et Chassenay puis La Ferté-Loupière), et de Champignelles en 1454	Jean II (1388-1438) seigneur de la Ferté-Loupière last of 1st branch of Ferté-Loupière	Guillaume II (1285-) seigneur de Tanlay	Philippe (1292-ap.1315) prieur
Jean IV (1410-1472) sgr. de Champignelles et St-Brisson	Jean II (1425-1480) seigneur de Bléneau	Pierre I (1429-1504) seigneur de La Ferté-Loupière (2e branche)	Charles (1434-1488) seigneur d'Arrablay; 1 son: François (1485-ap.1540), seigneur d'Arrablay	1. Guillaume (1427-ap.1485), seigneur de Coquetaine-en-Brie; 2. Pierre (1433-1461), seigneur d'Arrablay près de Gien	Robert III (1307-1346) seigneur de Tanlay	Jean II (1308-1342) seigneur de Tanlay	Philippe II (1320-1384) seigneur de Tanlay
Jean III (1465-1511) seigneur de Bléneau, Plancy, La Grange-en-Brie/-Bléneau, Villars (à Champignelles ?)	Hector (1475-1549) seigneur de la Ferté-Loupière	Jean I (1477-1534) sgr. de Chevillon et/ou Chevillon	Edmé (1489-1516), seigneur de Frauville/Froville	Louis Ier (1485-1540) seigneur de la Ville-au-Tartre en Gisors, en Vexin, et d'Yville (deux fiefs venus des de Trie)	1. Charles (1480-1511), seigneur de Bontin 2.Pierre (1487-1525), seigneur de Martroy	Pierre (1352-1383)	Étienne (1356-1383) seigneur de Ravières; Last of the line of Tanlay
François Ier (1495-1561) seigneur de Bléneau	1. Philippe (1497-1547), abbé de Lauroy; 2. Edmé (1501-1553), seigneur de Villars; 3. Jean (1505-), chevalier de Malte	1. René (1510-1562), seigneur de la Ferté-Loupière 2. Philippe (1512-1552), seigneur de (la) Villeneuve-la-Cornue	Jacques (1515-1557), seigneur de Chevillon	Guillaume (1520-1592), seigneur de Chevillon	Louis Ier (1485-1540), seigneur de la Ville-au-Tartre en Gisors, en Vexin, et d'Yville (deux fiefs venus des de Trie)
Gaspard (1550-1609), seigneur de Bléneau	1. Odet (1552-ap.1595) seigneur de Parc-Viel; 2. Charles (1557-); 3. Jean (1559-ap.1624), seigneur des Salles et du Coudray (à Bléneau ?): 1 son Jacques (1606-)	Jacques II (1556-1617), seigneur de Chevillon	René (1561-ap.1638) abbé	Jean II (1566-1639), seigneur de Chevillon	François (1526-1578), seigneur de Bontin	Louis II (1527-1565), seigneur de Bontin
François II (1575-1602)	Edmé/Esme (1577-1640), seigneur de Bléneau	Louis Ier (1610-1672), seigneur de Chevillon	Robert (1619-ap.1647)	Françoise (1558-ap.1583) m. Guy de Béthune, sire de Mareuil, cousin germain de François de Béthune	Anne (1564-1589), dame de Bontin et de Beaulieu en Auvergne m. Maximilien de Béthune, duc de Sully, fils de François ci-dessus
Gaspard II (1602-1655), seigneur de Bléneau	Louis-Charles (1640-1723), seigneur de Chevillon	Roger (1647-1733), abbé à Auxerre	Jean-Armand (1652-1677)
Louis Gaston (1669-1691)	Charles Roger (1671-1730), sgr de Chevillon (et/ou Chevillon)	Hélène (1689-1768) m. Louis-Bénigne de Bauffremont, Dukes of Bauffremont, adopted title of Prince of Courtenay

== Sources ==
- Angold, Michael (2011). "The Latin Empire of Constantinople, 1204–1261: Marriage Strategies". Identities and Allegiances in the Eastern Mediterranean after 1204. Farnham: Ashgate Publishing Limited. pp. 47–68.
