= Peter of Courtenay =

Peter of Courtenay may refer to:

- Peter I of Courtenay (died 1183), son of Louis VI of France
- Peter II of Courtenay (died 1219), emperor of Constantinople
- Peter of Courtenay, Lord of Conches (died 1249/50), crusader

== See also ==
- House of Courtenay
- Peter Courtenay (disambiguation)
