= House of Courtenay =

Medieval noble house

- Arms of the House of Courtenay
- Country: Latin Empire, France, England
- Founded: c. 11th century
- Founder: Athon of Courtenay
- Current head: Charles Courtenay, 19th Earl of Devon
- Titles: Latin Emperor of Constantinople; Prince of the blood (claim); Prince of Galilee; Margrave of Namur; Marquess of Exeter; Earl of Devon; Count of Edessa; Count of Nevers; Count of Auxerre; Count of Tonnerre; Viscount Courtenay of Powderham; Lord of Courtenay; Lord of Champignelles; Lord of Conches; Lord of Mehun-sur-Yèvre; Lord of Turbessel; Feudal Baron of Okehampton; Feudal Baron of Plympton; Baron Courtenay; Baronet Courtenay; Baronet Courtenay of Newcastle
- Cadet branches: Capetian House of Courtenay (female line); House of Bauffremont (female line)

Original undifferenced coat of arms of Courtenay: Or, three torteaux. Apparently adopted by Renaud de Courtenay before his death in 1160 and before the split of the family into French and English branches, as the arms are used both in France and England. These are therefore very early arms as heraldry came into widespread use from about 1200 to 1215

Location of Courtenay in the Gâtinais (Loiret), France. It is situated about 65 miles SE of Paris and was thus well within the control of the French kings and had no connection to any west-coast French possessions of the English kings (i.e. Normandy, Anjou, Aquitaine etc.), from which originated most early continental incomers to England. In this respect the English Courtenay family is unusual.

The House of Courtenay is a medieval noble house of French origins, with branches in France, England and the Holy Land. One branch of the Capetian dynasty bore the name of Courtenay through marriage to a Courtenay heiress and became a royal house of the dynasty, cousins of the Bourbons and the Valois, and achieved the title of Latin Emperor of Constantinople.

== Origin ==
The house was founded by Athon, the first lord of Courtenay in France. Athon took advantage of the succession crisis in the Duchy of Burgundy between Otto-William, Duke of Burgundy and King Robert II of France to capture a piece of land for himself, where he established his own seigneury (lordship), taking his surname from the town he founded and fortified.

Athon was succeeded by his son Joscelin, who had three sons: Miles, who was Lord of Courtenay after him; Prince Joscelin, who joined the First Crusade and became Count of Edessa; and Geoffrey, who also fought in the Holy Land and died there.

In the 12th century, Reginald de Courtenay (d.1160), son of Milo de Courtenay (d.1127), quarrelled with King Louis VII of France and moved to England: His French lands were forfeit, and passed, with his daughter Elizabeth, to Louis' brother Peter, who took the name "Peter de Courtenay". His son, Peter II, later became Latin Emperor of Constantinople.

== The Crusader house of Courtenay ==
Joscelin de Courtenay arrived in Outremer with the third wave of the First Crusade and proved himself capable, becoming in turn Lord of Turbessel, Prince of Galilee, and (in 1118) Count of Edessa, succeeding his cousin King Baldwin II of Jerusalem. He was succeeded in 1131 by his son, Joscelin II, but the county was lost in 1144, and Joscelin died in captivity in 1159. His son, Joscelin III, was the titular Count, while his sister, Agnes, became Queen of Jerusalem by marriage to King Amalric.

Amalric's second wife, Maria Komnene, Queen of Jerusalem, became the wife of Balian of Ibelin, of the House of Ibelin. Joscelin III died in the 1190s, succeeded by two daughters; his last property was passed by them to the Teutonic Order. His sister, Agnes of Courtenay, was mother to two monarchs, King Baldwin the Leper and Queen Sibylla. She later married Hugh of Ibelin, brother of Balian, who surrendered Jerusalem to Saladin in 1187.

== The English House of Courtenay ==
Map showing seats of the Courtenay family (Earls of Devon and junior branches) in England

Coat of arms of Courtenay, Earls of Devon Shield: Quarterly 1st and 4th Or, three torteaux (Courtenay); 2nd and 3rd Or, a lion rampant azure (Redvers, Earls of Devon)

Reginald de Courtenay's grandson, Robert de Courtenay (d.1242), feudal baron of Okehampton, Devon (in right of his mother Hawise de Curcy (d.1219),) married Mary de Redvers, daughter and heiress of William de Redvers, 5th Earl of Devon (d.1217), seated at Tiverton Castle and Plympton Castle in Devon. On the death of Isabel de Forz, suo jure 8th Countess of Devon in 1293 (the sister and heiress of Baldwin de Redvers, 7th Earl of Devon (1236–1262)) she was succeeded by her cousin Hugh de Courtenay, 1st/9th Earl of Devon (d.1340), feudal baron of Okehampton, the great-grandson of Robert de Courtenay (d.1242).

His title of Earl of Devon was not however officially recognised until 1335, and it remains unclear whether it was a new creation or a continuation of the Redvers title, with different modern sources giving him as either 1st or 9th Earl of Devon. The senior line seated at Tiverton, Okehampton and Plympton, died out in 1471 during the Wars of the Roses, but the Earldom was recreated three more times in 1485, 1511 and 1553 for cousins, all descended from the eldest son of the 2nd/10th Earl. William Courtenay, 1st Earl of Devon (1475–1511), would marry Princess Catherine of the Royal House of York, a younger daughter of King Edward IV, bringing the Earls of Devon very close to the line of succession to the English throne.

On the death of Edward Courtenay, 1st Earl of Devon (1527–1556), unmarried at Padua in 1556, the subject of the final creation of 1553, the title was considered extinct until declared in 1831 by the House of Lords to have been merely dormant, when it was confirmed to William Courtenay, Viscount Courtenay (1768–1835) (of the surviving junior line seated at Powderham Castle in Devon, descended from the fourth son of the 2nd/10th Earl) who became the 9th Earl of Devon. The family survives in the male line and is headed by Charles Courtenay, 19th Earl of Devon, of Powderham.

=== Family tree ===
Courtenay Family Tree, including: Earls of Devon (1st–4th creations), Courtenay Barons, Marquess of Exeter (1st creation), Viscount Courtenay, Courtenay Baronets of Powderham Castle

Richard de Redvers (d. 1107)
Earl of Devon (1st creation), probably in early 1141
Baldwin de Redvers (c. 1095–1155); Created 1141; 1st Earl of Devon
Richard de Redvers (d. 1162); 2nd Earl of Devon	William de Redvers (aka de Vernon) (d. 1217); 5th Earl of Devon	Renaud de Courtenay (d. 1194)
Baldwin de Redvers (d. 1188); 3rd Earl of Devon	Richard de Redvers (fl. c. 1066 d. 1234); 4th Earl of Devon	Baldwin de Redvers (d. 1216)	Mary de Vernon	Robert de Courtenay (d. 1242)
Baldwin de Redvers (1217–1245); 6th Earl of Devon	John de Courtenay (d. 1274)
Baldwin de Redvers (1236–1262); 7th Earl of Devon	Isabel de Redvers (1237–1293) suo jure 8th Countess of Devon	Hugh Courtenay (1249–1292)
Baron Courtenay, 1299; Earl of Devon (2nd creation or continuation of 1st creation), 1335
Hugh de Courtenay (1276–1340); 1st Baron Courtenay; 1st/9th Earl of Devon
Hugh de Courtenay (1303–1377); 2nd Baron Courtenay; 2nd/10th Earl of Devon
Hugh Courtenay (1327–1348)	Edward Courtenay of Godlington (c. 1331–1368/1371)	William Courtenay (c. 1342–1396); Archbishop of Canterbury	Philip Courtenay (c. 1355–1406)
Hugh Courtenay (c. 1345–1374); 3rd Baron Courtenay	Edward de Courtenay (1357–1419); 4th Baron Courtenay; 3rd/11th Earl of Devon	Hugh Courtenay	John Courtenay (d. before 1415)
Edward de Courtenay (c. 1385–1418); Styled Lord Courtenay	Hugh de Courtenay (1389–1422); 5th Baron Courtenay; 4th/12th Earl of Devon	Hugh Courtenay (d. 1471)	Philip Courtenay (1404–1463)
Thomas de Courtenay (1414–1458); 6th Baron Courtenay; 5th/13th Earl of Devon	Edward Courtenay (d. 1509); Created 1485; 1st Earl of Devon; Forfeit at his death by his son's attainder 1504	William Courtenay (d. 1485)
Thomas Courtenay (1432–1461); 7th Baron Courtenay; 6th/14th Earl of Devon	John Courtenay (1435–1471); Attaider of 1461 reversed Title restored 1470; 7th/15th Earl of Devon; Title in Abeyance 1471–1485; Attainder of 1461 re-invoked 1485, title forfeit	William Courtenay (d. 1511); Attainted 1504; Restored and Created 1511; 1st Earl of Devon	William Courtenay (d. 1512)
Earldom of Devon and Barony of Courtenay forfeit, 1461	Earldom of Devon forfeit, 1485
Marquess of Exeter, 1525
Henry Courtenay (1498–1538); 2nd Earl of Devon; Created 1525; 1st Marquess of Exeter; Attainted 1538; Titles forfeit	William Courtenay (1477–1535)
Marquessate of Exeter and Earldom of Devon forfeit, 1538
Earl of Devon, (2nd creation) 1553
Edward Courtenay (1527–1556); Created 1553; 1st Earl of Devon; Title granted with remainder to heirs male whatsoever Title Dormant until 1831	George Courtenay
William Courtenay (1529–1557) de jure 2nd Earl of Devon
William Courtenay (1543–1630) de jure 3rd Earl of Devon
William Courtenay (d. 1605)	Francis Courtenay de jure 4th Earl of Devon (c. 1576–1638)
William Courtenay (1628–1702); Created 1644; 1st Baronet of Powderham Castle de jure 5th Earl of Devon
Francis Courtenay (1650–1699)
William Courtenay (1675/6-1735); 2nd Baronet of Powderham Castle de jure 6th Earl of Devon
William Courtenay (1709–1762); 3rd Baronet of Powderham Castle; Created 1762; 1st Viscount Courtenay de jure 7th Earl of Devon	Henry Reginald Courtenay (1714–1763)
William Courtenay (1742–1788); 2nd Viscount Courtenay de jure 8th Earl of Devon	William Courtenay (1738–1783)	Henry Reginald Courtenay (1741–1803); Bishop of Exeter
William Courtenay (1768–1835); 3rd Viscount Courtenay; Claim established 1831 to Earldom; 9th Earl of Devon; Viscountcy Extinct	William Courtenay (1777–1859); 10th Earl of Devon
William Reginald Courtenay (1807–1888); 11th Earl of Devon	Henry Hugh Courtenay (1811–1904); 13th Earl of Devon	Thomas Peregrine Courtenay (1782–1841)
Edward Baldwin Courtenay (1836–1891); 12th Earl of Devon	Henry Reginald Courtenay (1850–1897); Styled Lord Courtenay
Charles Pepys Courtenay (1870–1927); 14th Earl of Devon	Henry Hugh Courtenay (1872–1935); 15th Earl of Devon	Frederick Leslie Courtenay (1875–1935); 16th Earl of Devon
Charles Christopher Courtenay (1916–1998); 17th Earl of Devon
Hugh Rupert Courtenay (1942–2015); 18th Earl of Devon
Charles Peregrine Courtenay (b. 1975); 19th Earl of Devon
Jack Haydon Langer Courtenay (b. 2009); Styled Lord Courtenay; Heir Apparent

== The Capetian House of Courtenay ==
Reginald de Courtenay's daughter, Elizabeth, was given in marriage, together with his forfeited French lands, by the French Capetian King Louis VII with whom he had quarreled, to his youngest brother Peter of France (d.1183), henceforth known as Peter I of Courtenay. Peter and Elizabeth's descendants were members of the Capetian House of Courtenay, a cadet branch of the House of Capet, the French royal house. Their descendants acquired through marriage the County of Namur and the Latin Empire of Constantinople. This branch became extinct in the male line in 1733, with the name Courtenay passing on to the Princely House of Bauffremont. Notable members of the Bauffremonts were made Princes of the Holy Roman Empire, Imperial Counts by Napoleon Bonaparte and Dukes by Louis XVIII.

=== Claim to French royal status ===
The House of Bourbon, which acquired the French throne with the accession of Henry IV of France in 1589, was another cadet branch of the Capetian dynasty. Under the Salic law, males descended in male line from Hugh Capet are princes of the blood—i.e., they have the right to succeed to the French throne in the event that the male line of the royal family and of more senior princes die out. Hence, the then-impoverished Capetian House of Courtenay, being agnatic descendants of Louis VI of France, sought to be acknowledged as "princes du sang" (Princes of the Blood Royal) and "cousins to the king", two titles normally reserved for the members of the royal family and prized for the seats at the Royal Council and the Parlement of Paris that they conferred upon its holders.

Moreover, the Bourbons had difficulty producing surviving male dynasts in quantity until the mid-17th century. The Capetian Courtenays were, after their cousins the Bourbons, the most senior surviving agnatic branch of the House of Capet, and under strict application of Salic law the Crown would pass to them should the Bourbons fall extinct.

Three Bourbon kings in a row—Henry IV, Louis XIII and Louis XIV—turned down their petitions and the right to use a differenced version of the fleur-de-lys royal arms. That the Bourbon monarchs confined the French royalty to the descendants of Louis IX is evidenced by the Treaty of Montmartre (1662) which named the non-Capetian House of Lorraine as the next in line to the French throne after the Bourbons, thus bypassing the Courtenay branch, a Capetian family. Although the Courtenays protested against this clause, their claims to the princely title were never acknowledged by the Paris Court of Accounts.

The last male member of the French Courtenays died in 1733. His niece married the marquis de Bauffremont, and their descendants assumed the title of "Prince de Courtenay" with dubious validity, which they bear to this day. The marquis de Bauffremont was made on 8 June 1757 Prince of the Holy Roman Empire (inheritable by all male-line descendants); this title was recognised in France. Bauffremont-Courtenay are also princes of Carency and dukes of Bauffremont.

== Genealogy ==
- Athon
  - Joscelin I of Courtenay, married 1. Hildegarde de Gâtinais (sister of Geoffrey III of Anjou), 2. Isabel de Montlhéry, daughter of Guy I of Montlhéry
    - Hodierna, married Geoffrey II, Count of Joinville
    - Miles of Courtenay (d.1127), married Ermengarde of Nevers
      - William de Courtenay
      - Joscelin de Courtenay
      - Reginald de Courtenay (d. 1160), married firstly, Hélène du Donjon, and secondly, after his move to England, Maud du Sap, d.1219, daughter of Robert FitzEdith (d.1172) (illegitimate son of King Henry I of England by Edith FitzForne).
        - Renaud de Courtenay (d. 1194), married Hawise de Curcy, heiress to the English feudal barony of Okehampton, Devon.
          - Robert de Courtenay (d.1242) feudal baron of Okehampton, married Lady Mary de Redvers, d. of William de Redvers, 5th Earl of Devon (d.1217)
            - John de Courtenay (d.1274)
              - Hugh de Courtenay (d.1292)
                - Hugh de Courtenay, 9th Earl of Devon (d.1340)
                  - (Earls of Devon)
        - Elizabeth de Courtenay, married Peter I of Courtenay (d.1183), son of King Louis VI of France.
          - (Capetian branch)
    - Joscelin I, Count of Edessa, married 1. Beatrice (daughter of Constantine I of Armenia), 2. Maria of Salerno (sister of Roger of Salerno)
      - Joscelin II, Count of Edessa, married Beatrice
        - Joscelin III of Edessa, married Alice of Milly
          - Beatrix de Courtenay, married Otto von Botenlauben (Count of Henneberg)
          - Agnes, married William of La Mandelie
        - Agnes of Courtenay, married 1. Reginald of Marash, 2. King Amalric of Jerusalem, 3. Hugh of Ibelin, 4. Reginald of Sidon
        - Isabella of Courtenay, married Prince Thoros II of Armenia
    - Geoffrey of Champlay

Genealogy of the Capetian House of Courtenay - Beginning to Latin Empire

Athon or Hutton (~985- >1000) Châtelain de Châteaurenard, seigneur de Courtenay
Joscelin I (c. 1034-after 1069), seigneur de Courtenay m. 1. Hildegarde de Château-Landon, daughter of Geoffrey II of Gâtinais, and Ermengarde of Anjou (daughter of Fulk III of Anjou), & had a d. From this 2nd wife:
Joscelin I (d. 1131); Count of Edessa, 1118; Prince of Galilee, 1112-1119	Miles de Courtenay (d. after 1145) seigneur de Courtenay m. Ermengarde of Nevers
Joscelin II (died 1159); Count of Edessa, 1131–1144	Louis VI king of France; HOUSE OF CAPET	Renaud de Courtenay (d. 1160) seigneur de Courtenay lost lands in France to Louis VII. Lands went to his son-in-law Peter of France
Agnes (c. 1136 – c. 1184) m.Amalric, King of Jerusalem & Anjou. Her ch. Baldwin IV of Jerusalem the Leper and Sibylla of Jerusalem were monarchs of Jerusalem, as was her grandson Baldwin V of Jerusalem	Joscelin III (c. 1139 – after 1190) titl. Count of Edessa; Seneschal of Jerusalem, (1176–1190) lord of the seigneurie de Joscelin	Louis VII king of France	Peter of France & Courtenay (1126-1183); CAPETIAN HOUSE OF COURTENAY seigneur de Courtenay	Élisabeth de Courtenay (1127-1205), dame de Courtenay	Renaud de Courtenay (d. 1160)	Hawise de Curcy heiress to the English feudal barony of Okehampton, Devon.
Philip II Augustus; King of France	Yolanda of Flanders hieress of Latin Emperors Baldwin I of Flanders and Henry I of Flanders	Peter II of Courtenay (d. late 1217); Latin Emperor of Constantinople, 1216	--> Robert (c. 1168 – 1239); Seigneur de Champignelles	William (1168 – bef. 1248); Seigneur of Tanlay	Robert de Courtenay (d.1242) feudal baron of Okehampton, married Lady Mary de Redvers, d. of William de Redvers, 5th Earl of Devon (d.1217)
Philip II (1195–1226); Marquis of Namur, 1216	Robert of Courtenay d.1228 5th Latin Emperor	Henry II (1206–1229) margrave of Namur, 1226	Baldwin (1217 – 1273); 6th Latin Emperor of Constantinople, 1228–73 (in exile 1261–73); Sold County of Namur, 1256	Peter (c. 1218 – 1249 or 1250 in Egypt); Lord of Conches and Mehun	Guillaume de Courtenay (1228 – 1280), seigneur de Venisy & seigneur de Champignelles	1. Philippe de Courtenay; (1221-1246) seigneur de Champignelles; 2. Raoul I de Courtenay, seigneur d'Illiers (b. 1223 – d. 1271)	3. Robert de Courtenay, seigneur de Danville et Nonancourt (b. 1224 – d. 1279), évêque d'Orléans; 4. Jean I de Courtenay (1226-1271), archevêque de Reims	House of Courtenay in England; Earls of Devon
Philip I titl. Latin Emperor of Constantinople,(1243 – 1283) m. Beatrice of Sicily, daughter of Charles I of Sicily	1re branche de Champignelles	Robert I (1205-1260) seigneur de Tanlay

Genealogy of the Capetian House of Courtenay 2 - Later Courtenays

1re branche de Champignelles from Guillaume (1228-1280) seigneur de Champignelles	branche de Tarlay
Robert (1251-1324) archevêque de Reims	Pierre (1259-1290)	Jean Ier (1265-1318) seigneur de Champignelles	Robert Ier (1205-1260) seigneur de Tanlay	Jean (1220—ap.1248)	Baudouin (1211-ap.1222)
Jean II (1291-1334) seigneur de Champignelles	Philippe (1292-1346) seigneur de La Ferté-Loupière (1re branche)	Robert (1296-1331), moine; -Guillaume (1299-ap.1331), vidame de Reims -Étienne (1305-1348), prêtre	Pierre (1305-1348) seigneur d'Autry	Jean I (1230-1285) seigneur de Tanlay
Jean III (1330-1392) seigneur de Champignelles	Pierre II (1334-1394) seigneur de Champignelles	Jean I (1346-1412) seigneur de la Ferté-Loupière	Robert II (1260-1310) seigneur de Tanlay	Étienne (1262-ap.1332), seigneur de Tanerre	Philippe (1264-1300), seigneur de Ravières	Jean (1266-1300), abbé de Quincey
Pierre III (1377-1411) seigneur de Champignelles et St-Brisson	Jean I (1379-1460) seigneur de Bléneau, héritier entre 1417 et 1455 de la 1re branche de La Ferté-Loupière (see below: Tannerre et Chassenay puis La Ferté-Loupière), et de Champignelles en 1454	Jean II (1388-1438) seigneur de la Ferté-Loupière last of 1st branch of Ferté-Loupière	Guillaume II (1285-) seigneur de Tanlay	Philippe (1292-ap.1315) prieur
Jean IV (1410-1472) sgr. de Champignelles et St-Brisson	Jean II (1425-1480) seigneur de Bléneau	Pierre I (1429-1504) seigneur de La Ferté-Loupière (2e branche)	Charles (1434-1488) seigneur d'Arrablay; 1 son: François (1485-ap.1540), seigneur d'Arrablay	1. Guillaume (1427-ap.1485), seigneur de Coquetaine-en-Brie; 2. Pierre (1433-1461), seigneur d'Arrablay près de Gien	Robert III (1307-1346) seigneur de Tanlay	Jean II (1308-1342) seigneur de Tanlay	Philippe II (1320-1384) seigneur de Tanlay
Jean III (1465-1511) seigneur de Bléneau, Plancy, La Grange-en-Brie/-Bléneau, Villars (à Champignelles ?)	Hector (1475-1549) seigneur de la Ferté-Loupière	Jean I (1477-1534) sgr. de Chevillon et/ou Chevillon	Edmé (1489-1516), seigneur de Frauville/Froville	Louis Ier (1485-1540) seigneur de la Ville-au-Tartre en Gisors, en Vexin, et d'Yville (deux fiefs venus des de Trie)	1. Charles (1480-1511), seigneur de Bontin 2.Pierre (1487-1525), seigneur de Martroy	Pierre (1352-1383)	Étienne (1356-1383) seigneur de Ravières; Last of the line of Tanlay
François Ier (1495-1561) seigneur de Bléneau	1. Philippe (1497-1547), abbé de Lauroy; 2. Edmé (1501-1553), seigneur de Villars; 3. Jean (1505-), chevalier de Malte	1. René (1510-1562), seigneur de la Ferté-Loupière 2. Philippe (1512-1552), seigneur de (la) Villeneuve-la-Cornue	Jacques (1515-1557), seigneur de Chevillon	Guillaume (1520-1592), seigneur de Chevillon	Louis Ier (1485-1540), seigneur de la Ville-au-Tartre en Gisors, en Vexin, et d'Yville (deux fiefs venus des de Trie)
Gaspard (1550-1609), seigneur de Bléneau	1. Odet (1552-ap.1595) seigneur de Parc-Viel; 2. Charles (1557-); 3. Jean (1559-ap.1624), seigneur des Salles et du Coudray (à Bléneau ?): 1 son Jacques (1606-)	Jacques II (1556-1617), seigneur de Chevillon	René (1561-ap.1638) abbé	Jean II (1566-1639), seigneur de Chevillon	François (1526-1578), seigneur de Bontin	Louis II (1527-1565), seigneur de Bontin
François II (1575-1602)	Edmé/Esme (1577-1640), seigneur de Bléneau	Louis Ier (1610-1672), seigneur de Chevillon	Robert (1619-ap.1647)	Françoise (1558-ap.1583) m. Guy de Béthune, sire de Mareuil, cousin germain de François de Béthune	Anne (1564-1589), dame de Bontin et de Beaulieu en Auvergne m. Maximilien de Béthune, duc de Sully, fils de François ci-dessus
Gaspard II (1602-1655), seigneur de Bléneau	Louis-Charles (1640-1723), seigneur de Chevillon	Roger (1647-1733), abbé à Auxerre	Jean-Armand (1652-1677)
Louis Gaston (1669-1691)	Charles Roger (1671-1730), sgr de Chevillon (et/ou Chevillon)	Hélène (1689-1768) m. Louis-Bénigne de Bauffremont, Dukes of Bauffremont, adopted title of Prince of Courtenay

== Armorial ==
As pointed out in the article on the Origin of coats of arms many coats of arms functioned as signs of interrelated families that shared similar interests and intermarried. In that sense, the founder of the Courtenay family, Athon was said to have married into the family of the Counts of Boulogne in the person of Ermengarde (or Erbeburge) de Boulogne. Their son was Joscelin de Courtenay, who followed his Boulogne cousins on the Crusades and became Count of Edessa. Boulogne was often depicted with 3 or 4 red torteaux, whereas Courtenay was always 3.

=== French Courtenays ===
House of Courtenay

Courtenay

Arms of Pierre II de Courtenay as Count of Nevers, Auxerre, and Tonnerre, based on his seal of 1210.

Arms of Courtenay-Constantinople

Blason famille fr de Courtenay-Champignelles

Blason famille fr de Courtenay-Yerre

Courtenay de Chevillon

Courtenay-Chevillon prince of France

=== English Courtenays ===
Courtenay Undifferenced Arms

House of Courtenay in England

Arms of Hugh de Courtenay/Courtenay of Powderham, Devon: Or, three torteaux a label of three points azure on each point three plates, abandoned in 19th.c. by Earls of Devon (of Powderham Castle) in favour of undifferenced arms

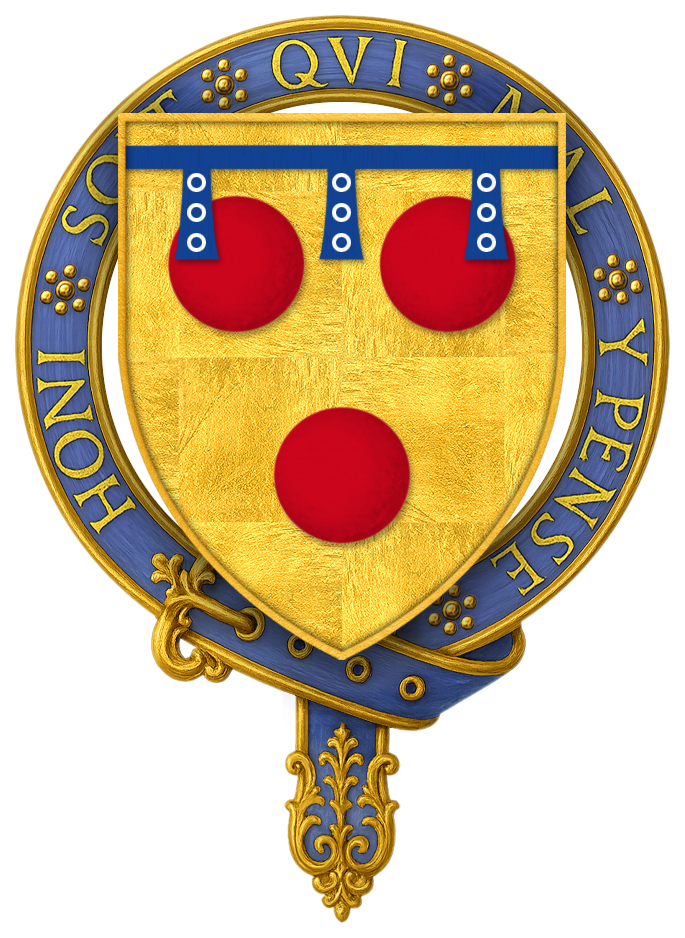
Coat of Arms of Sir Hugh de Courtenay, KG, (1327–1349), one of the founders in 1348 and also of Sir Peter Courtenay, KG, (1388-1405) invested in 1388–1389

Arms of the House of Courtenay, earls of Devon (quarterly)

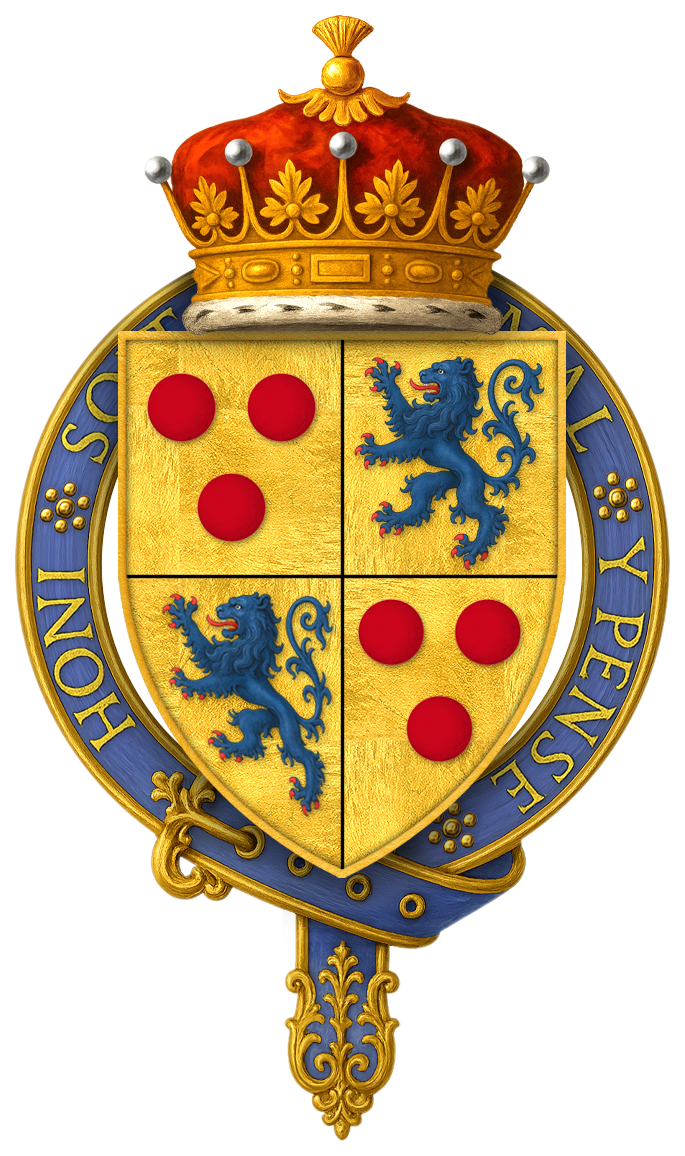
Coat of arms of Sir Edward Courtenay, 1st Earl of Devon, KG d. 1509 invested c.1494

Coat of arms of Courtenay, Earls of Devon

Hugh, sg. de Spensier - Cortenay: Hugh de Courtenay, Lord of Okephampton, Father of Hugh de Courtenay, 9th Earl of Devon, Arms in the Chronicle of Tournoi de Compiègne

Arms of Henry Courtenay, Marquess of Exeter

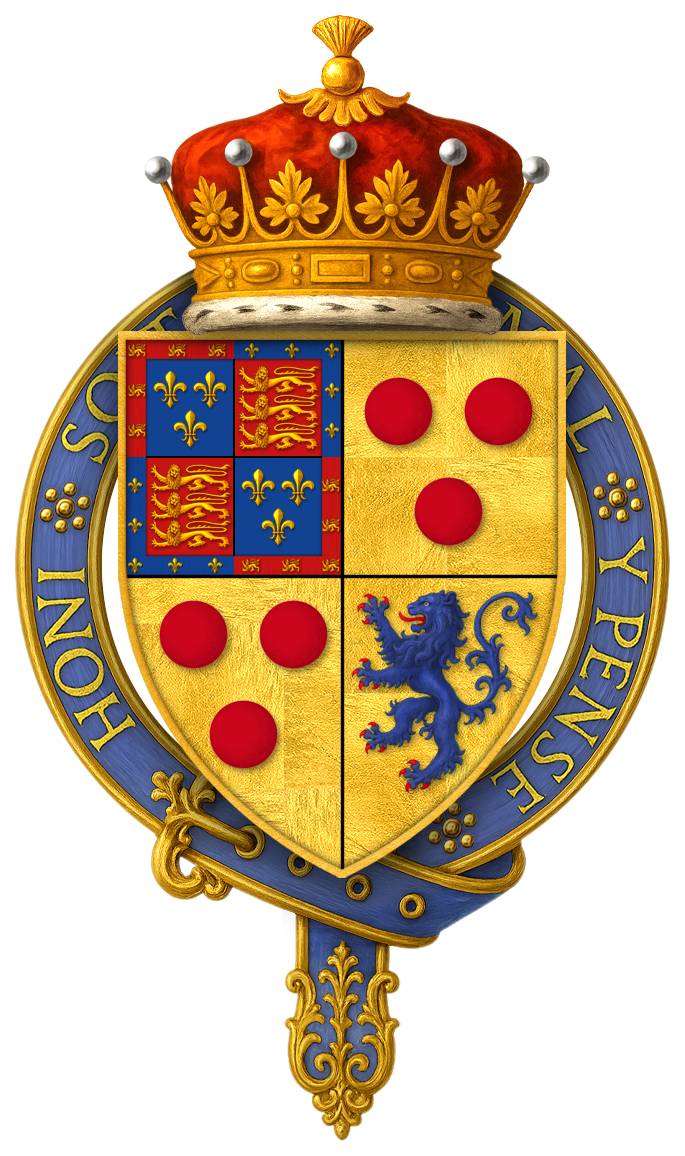
Coat of arms of Sir Henry Courtenay, 10th Earl of Devon, KG and later Marquis of Exeter from his Garter stall plate.

== Bibliography ==
- Runciman, Steven (1951) A History of the Crusades: Vols. I-II. Cambridge University Press
- Sanders, I.J. (1960) English Baronies. Oxford
- Kenneth Setton (1969) A History of the Crusades. Univ. Wisconsin
