= Robert, Lord of Champignelles =

French noble

Robert of Courtenay, Lord of Champignelles
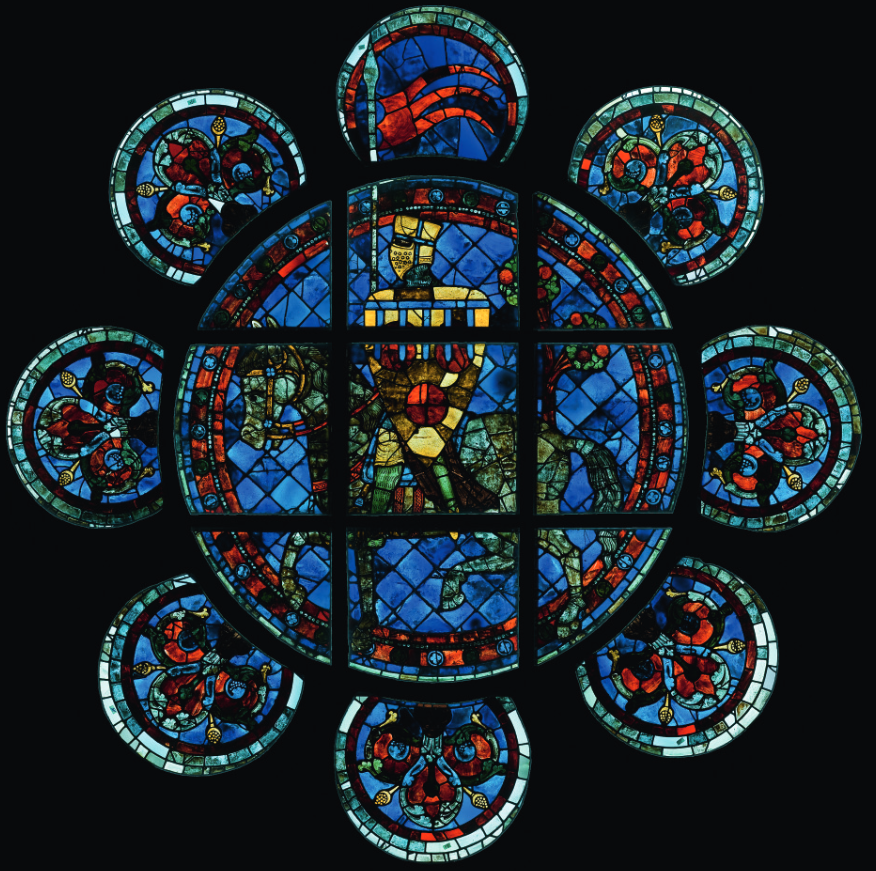
- Stained Glass of Robert de Courtenay, Chartres Cathedral

- Coat of arms
- Born: c. 1168
- Died: 1239; Palestine
- Noble family: Capetian House of Courtenay
- Spouses: Constance of Toucy; Matilda of Mehun
- Issue Detail: Pierre II de Courtenay
- Father: Peter I of Courtenay
- Mother: Elizabeth de Courtenay

Robert of Courtenay (French: Robert de Courtenay, c. 1168 – 1239) was lord of Champignelles and grandson of Louis VI of France. He was the seventh child of ten children of Peter I of Courtenay (1126–1183) and his wife, Elizabeth de Courtenay. Robert took part in the conquest of Normandy in 1204. During the siege of Château Gaillard, he fought alongside his cousin Philip II of France. In 1228, he left for a crusade to the Holy Land, where he died eleven years later in Palestine.

== Early life, family and acquisitions ==
Robert of Courtenay was born around 1168. He was the grandson of Louis VI through his father Peter, and descended from the Courtenay family on his mother’s side – a powerful noble lineage from the regions of Gâtinais and Puisaye, founded by Athon of Courtenay. From this lineage, several branches of the family emerged: the Edessan branch founded by Josselin, the English branch founded by another Robert, and finally the Capetian branch created through the marriage of Elisabeth and one of Louis VI’s sons, Peter of Courtenay, Robert’s father. Indeed, the king’s children were often married to wealthy heiresses, as in the case of Robert of Dreux. The Dreux and Courtenay families formed the first closely related and loyal cousins of the kings up to the generation of Saint Louis.

Robert inherited part of the ancestral fiefs of the Lords of Courtenay and, at an unknown date, married Constance of Toucy, daughter of his overlord Narjot II of Toucy. This first marriage brought him a daughter, Blanche of Courtenay, but no lands – whereas his elder brother had married the heiress of the counties of Auxerre, Tonnerre, and Nevers, making him a very powerful lord. Constance of Toucy died in 1200, leaving the Lord of Champignelles without a male heir.

Between 1203 and 1206, Robert of Courtenay distinguished himself during the conquest of Normandy by King Philip Augustus, his cousin. He fought in the siege of Château Gaillard, and when the fortress was taken, the king rewarded him with the lordships of Conches, formerly held by the Tosny family, and Nonancourt, a ducal fortress previously in the hands of the kings of England. Philip Augustus needed loyal and relatively minor lords to manage these newly conquered lands. For this reason, he also granted the fortress of Argentan to his marshal Henri I Clément, and Saint-André to Pierre Mauvoisin. The acquisition of these two Norman fiefs provided Robert with financial and military resources he had not previously possessed. Moreover, he became a liegeman of the king, granting him greater independence from the Lord of Toucy. A 1206 inventory of jewels and precious stones shows that he purchased several jewels from the crown shortly after receiving these lands – a testament to the financial impact they had on him.

Later, around 1209, he married Mathilda of Mehun, a widow from Berry, who brought with her the lordships of Mehun-sur-Yèvres and Selles-sur-Cher. Philip Augustus, evidently the instigator of this marriage, saw it as a way to extend Capetian influence in Berry, whose lords owed homage to the Archbishop of Bourges.

In 1210, a conflict arose between Robert of Courtenay and his overlord Ithier of Toucy. Both fortified their positions in Gâtinais and Puisaye – Monbois and Septfonds respectively. The king intervened to prevent the conflict from escalating. Robert renewed his nominal homage to the Lord of Toucy and was allowed to keep his fortifications. Shortly afterward, he founded a new town south of Champignelles – the present-day Villeneuve-les-Genêts – with the aim of colonizing and populating this previously uninhabited land.

== Albigensian Crusade ==
After the assassination of Peter of Castelnau in 1208, Pope Innocent III called for a crusade in the south of France, targeting the lands of Count Raymond VI of Toulouse, who was accused of having ordered the murder. Several lords responded to the pope’s call to arms in the Midi, including Robert of Courtenay, whose presence is documented. After performing public penance, Raymond VI chose to join the crusaders’ cause, while cleverly redirecting the crusade toward the fiefs of his rebellious vassal, Raymond-Roger Trencavel. Upon arriving in Lyon, where the crusaders gathered in 1209, Raymond met with Pierre and Robert of Courtenay, his cousins, who were pleased to see him join the cause.

Robert of Courtenay thus took part in the siege of Béziers, which was sacked and pillaged, and then in the siege of Carcassonne, before returning north like most of the crusaders. Only Simon de Montfort, who had been appointed leader of the crusade, remained in the south with a handful of lords and knights.

Later, as he prepared to besiege Cabaret, Simon de Montfort called once more upon the northern lords. Pierre and Robert of Courtenay returned to the south in 1211, joined by other nobles such as Juhel of Mayenne and Enguerrand of Coucy. The fortress of Cabaret surrendered fairly quickly, and the crusaders then turned their attention to Lavaur, a heavily fortified town with deep moats. The siege was commanded by Simon de Montfort, Pierre, and Robert of Courtenay. The city was large and well-defended, and the crusaders awaited reinforcements from German and Frisian knights. These reinforcements, however, were ambushed near Montgey by Count Raymond-Roger of Foix, who seized a great deal of loot. The townspeople also attacked the crusaders. Upon learning this, Simon de Montfort, Peter, and Robert of Courtenay, enraged, pursued the count, but he had already fled. In retaliation, they took vengeance on the people of Montgey before returning to the siege of Lavaur.

The commanders then had to revise their strategy. Peter and Robert of Courtenay decided to construct a wooden bridge across the Agout River, which ran through the city, in order to encircle it, cut off all supplies, and open a new front of attack. It was at this point that Raymond VI defected from the crusaders. His cousins Peter and Robert of Courtenay reportedly tried to persuade him not to join the heretics, but to no avail.

Eventually, the city was taken and sacked. The three commanders chose to punish the defenders by hanging all the knights who had defended the town, and throwing Lady Guiraude of Lavaur into a well and stoning her to death.

Back in the north, bolstered by his reputation and deeds in the Midi, Robert of Courtenay was able to grow closer to Blanche of Castile and Prince Louis as early as the following year.

== Expedition to England ==
Thanks to the reputation he earned during the Albigensian Crusade, Robert of Courtenay was able to grow closer to the princely couple, who had already formed a young court of loyal knights. Thus, in 1216, when Prince Louis decided to conquer England at the invitation of the English barons during the First Barons' War, Robert was among the knights who followed him.

He accompanied the prince throughout the first phase of major conquests, including the capture of Canterbury, Rochester, London, Rogate, Guildford, Farnham, Winchester, and Odiham. He was also present at the lengthy siege of Dover at the end of 1216. In recognition of his service, Prince Louis rewarded him with the castle of Rogate.

However, Robert of Courtenay had to return to France shortly after the siege of Dover. His elder brother, Peter of Courtenay, had been offered the imperial crown of Constantinople. One of the knights accompanying Peter, Count William of Sancerre – Robert’s brother-in-law – asked Robert to look after his county until his return or, in the event of his death, until his son Louis reached adulthood.

But the situation worsened for Prince Louis after many English barons defected. In response, Blanche of Castile gathered barons in Calais to launch a relief expedition for the prince. A fleet was assembled, and command was entrusted to Robert of Courtenay, who was assisted in the expedition by the pirate Eustace the Monk. Eustace had already supported Prince Louis during the initial crossing and throughout the campaign. The flagship of the fleet also belonged to him.

Hubert de Burgh, the English Justiciar, sought to prevent the landing. He feigned an attack on Calais using smaller ships. Since the city was well fortified, Robert and Eustace were not concerned by what appeared to be a minor threat. However, this was a ruse: the Justiciar turned about and, with the wind in his favor, rammed Eustace’s flagship, which was carrying all the leading French knights, along with supplies, gold, and a trebuchet. All on board were captured or killed, and Eustace was beheaded.

Robert of Courtenay was then taken to Rochester, where he was held under the custody of William Marshal. He was exchanged for Robert of Dreux in order to facilitate negotiations between the aging Marshal and Prince Louis. Robert then rode to London, where he fulfilled a diplomatic role with great skill. His negotiations led to the Treaty of Lambeth, the release of the French knights, and their return to the continent in exchange for 10,000 marks paid to the prince.

Upon returning to France, Robert learned that his brother Peter had been captured by Theodore Lascaris on the road to Constantinople. Pope Honorius III entrusted command of a rescue army to Robert. However, since much of the aristocracy was already engaged in the Fifth Crusade (Damietta) and others had just returned from the English expedition, the campaign could not be organized in time – Peter died in 1219.

Nonetheless, the last decade had firmly established Robert of Courtenay as a prominent figure of the French aristocracy and a close confidant of Prince Louis. He is thus depicted among several other knights in the stained glass windows of Chartres Cathedral, following the prince.

== Short reign of Louis VIII ==
When Prince Louis became King Louis VIII in 1223, he appointed Robert of Courtenay as Butler of France. This title granted Robert both social elevation, allowing him to be counted among the great barons of the kingdom, and a position as one of the king’s trusted advisors, alongside Chamberlain Bartholomew of Roye, Chancellor Guerin, and Constable Matthew of Montmorency. His seal thus appears on many royal charters.

He then accompanied the king in the conquest of Poitou and Saintonge, participating in the capture of Niort and La Rochelle in 1224, and later joined him in the Albigensian Crusade in 1226. The crusading army expected an easy passage through Avignon, but the city put up fierce resistance. The siege lasted five months and proved extremely difficult for the crusaders.

First, it was necessary to ensure that Emperor Frederick II would not come to the aid of the besieged city, which was within Imperial territory. To that end, the barons – including Robert of Courtenay – drafted a letter justifying their attack. During the campaign, Count Theobald of Champagne and Count Peter Mauclerc of Brittany defected from the royal cause, weakening the army.

Worse still, disease ravaged the besieging forces, affecting many, including the king himself. After the eventual capture of Avignon, tragedy continued to strike: Philip of Namur, Robert of Courtenay’s nephew and close friend, succumbed to illness. Chroniclers emphasize the psychological toll of the siege and its aftermath on both the barons and the king. Louis was reportedly deeply affected by the defection of Theobald of Champagne and the death of Count Philip of Namur, who had been a close companion.

Finally, the king himself died of dysentery at Montpensier Castle.

== Later years ==
Saint Louis, too young to rule, had to leave the regency to his mother, Blanche of Castile, who found herself in conflict with several barons over the control of the realm. Robert of Courtenay remained loyal, and the queen could count on his support and that of the other royal advisors – after all, he had long been a trusted friend of hers. He also followed the king against Peter Mauclerc in 1229. However, he did not remain long in the campaign; once his military service ended, he joined other barons in waging war against Theobald of Champagne.

Indeed, by abandoning King Louis VIII during the siege of Avignon in 1226, the Count of Champagne had made many enemies. The barons accused him of adultery with the queen, of deliberately abandoning Louis VIII to pursue his affair, and some even claimed he had poisoned the late king! A song by the trouvère Hugh de la Ferté harshly criticized the count, lending credence to these rumors. Robert, along with several other barons, launched attacks against the Count of Champagne from the north, likely aiming to seize Troyes. The king had to intervene to stop the barons from continuing their plundering. A peace agreement was reached, and Theobald agreed to take the cross for the Holy Land, which allowed the barons to remain under royal authority until Peter Mauclerc was definitively subdued in 1234.

Robert of Courtenay officially took the cross in 1235, and Pope Gregory IX granted him indulgences. However, he took advantage of the situation to plunder the nearby monastery of Valençay. Enraged, the pope excommunicated him and placed an interdict on his lands. As an act of penance, Robert founded the Abbey of Notre-Dame de Beauvoir in Marmagne in 1237.

He departed in 1239 to join the Barons' Crusade, during which the elderly lord died.

== Marriages and issue ==
Robert de Courtenay married twice. His first marriage in c. 1200 was to Constance de Toucy (c. 1175–1224). They had two daughters:

- Agnes de Courtenay (1204–1206), married Gibaud III de Saint-Vérain.
- Clémence de Courtenay

Robert married secondly to Mathilde de Mehun (c. 1195–1240), daughter of Philippe de Mehun sur Yèvres. Robert and Mathilde married sometime around 1216 or 10 December 1218. Their marriage produced eight children:

- Pierre II de Courtenay (1218–1249)
- Blanche de Courtenay, dame de Bléneau (1218–1240)
- Philippe de Courtenay, seigneur de Champignelles (d. 1245)
- Isabelle de Courtenay (1219–1256)
- Raoul I de Courtenay, seigneur d'Illiers (1223–1271)
- Robert de Courtenay, seigneur de Danville et Nonancourt (1224–1279)
- Jean I de Courtenay (d. 1276)
- Guillaume de Courtenay, seigneur de Venisy (1228–1280), all further agnatic descendants would descend from him

Robert, Lord of Champignelles Capetian House of Courtenay Cadet branch of the Capetian dynasty Born: c. 1168 Died: 1239
Preceded by Peter I	Lord of Champignelles; 1205-1239	Succeeded by Peter II
