= Joscelin of Courtenay =

Joscelin of Courtenay may refer to:

- Joscelin I, Lord of Courtenay (died after 1065)
- Joscelin I, Count of Edessa (died 1131), son of prec.
- Joscelin II, Count of Edessa (died 1159), son of prec.
- Joscelin III, Count of Edessa (died after 1190), son of prec.
