= Joscelin I =

Joscelin I may refer to:

- Joscelin I, Lord of Courtenay (died after 1065)
- Joscelin I of Edessa (died 1131), son of prec.
