= Prince du sang =

Legitimate descendant of a sovereign

Heraldic coronet of a prince du sang in the Kingdom of France

A prince du sang (French pronunciation: [pʁɛ̃s dy sɑ̃]) or prince of the blood is a person legitimately descended in male line from a sovereign. The female equivalent is princesse du sang (princess of the blood), being applied to the daughter of a prince of the blood. The most prominent examples include members of the French royal line, but the term prince of the blood has been used in other families more generally, for example among the British royal family and when referring to the Shinnōke in Japan.

In some European kingdoms, especially France, this appellation was a specific rank in its own right, with a more restricted use than other titles. In France, such rank recognised succession to the throne, should the main male royal line fail, as with the House of Valois succeeded by the House of Bourbon.

== History ==
Under the House of Capet of France, the monarchy was feudal, and the younger sons and grandsons of kings did not have rights or precedence based on their royal descent. Feudal titles determined rank. Under Philip Augustus, the Duke of Burgundy, a peer of France, could be reckoned to be mightier than the Count of Dreux, a "baron of the second rank", even though the latter was a paternal cousin of the king, while the former was only a distant agnate. In the feudal era, the agnates of the king held no special status, because agnatic primogeniture had not yet received its sanction as the law governing the succession to the French throne.

Following the Valois succession, the agnates of the king, being "capable of the crown", rose in prominence. New peerages were created for the king's agnates, and for a long time this continued to be so, before the peerage was extended to non-royalty. Over time, the dignity of a peer, which was feudal in nature, and the dignity of a prince of the blood, which was dynastic in nature, clashed. Non-royal peers and princes of the blood who were peers constantly competed for precedence. As the royal line contracted, each prince of the blood gained greater prominence. Finally, in 1576, King Henry III of France issued an edict, to counter the growing power of the House of Guise, which made the princes of the blood supreme over the peerage, and amongst themselves, the closer in the line of succession would outrank the more distant, without regard to the actual title that they held.

== As a rank ==
In France, the rank of prince du sang was the highest held at court after the immediate family of the king during the ancien régime and the Bourbon Restoration. The rank of prince du sang or princesse du sang was restricted to legitimate agnates of the Capetian dynasty who were not members of the immediate family of the king. Originating in the 14th century, male princes du sang came to be recognized as entitled to seats on the Conseil du Roi and the Parlement de Paris, to precedence above all peers and to precedence among each other according to their respective places in the order of succession.

During the last century of the reign of the House of Valois, when religious strife brought forth rivals for the throne, prince du sang became restricted in use to refer to dynasts who were distant members of the royal family (i.e., those who were not children or grandchildren in the male line of a French king and, as such, entitled to specific, higher rank of their own as enfants and petits-enfants de France).

In theory, the princes of the blood included all members of the Capetian dynasty. In practice, only the agnatic descendants of Saint Louis IX, such as the Valois and the Bourbons, were acknowledged as princes du sang. France's kings, for instance, refused to recognize the Courtenay Capetians as princes of the blood. The Courtenays descended in legitimate male-line from King Louis VI, but had become impoverished, minor nobles over the centuries. Their repeated petitions for recognition to the Bourbon rulers were in vain. When the Treaty of Montmartre was concluded in 1662, declaring the House of Lorraine to be heirs to the French throne in the event of extinction of the Bourbons, the Courtenays protested, requesting substitution of the phrase "the royal house issued in legitimate male line from the kings of France" to no avail. In 1715 Louis-Charles de Courtenay, his son Charles-Roger and his brother Roger were once again rebuffed in their attempt to seek recognition of their status. Roger, abbé de Courtenay, was the last male of the family, dying on 5 May 1733, and his sister Hélène de Courtenay, marquise de Bauffremont (1689–20 June 1768), obtained no redress when she appealed to the king in 1737 after the Parlement of Paris ordered the term "princesse du sang royal de France" deleted from court documents.

Even a cadet branch of the Bourbon line, the Bourbon-Carencys, who were most distantly related to the Dukes of Bourbon, were denied princely rank and excluded from the Conseil du Roi until their extinction in 1530. They descended from Jean, seigneur de Carency (1378–1457), the youngest son of Jean I de Bourbon, Count of La Marche.

Since 1733, all legitimate male Capetians were of the House of Bourbon, of the Vendôme branch, descended from Charles, Duke of Vendôme. Charles' eldest son Antoine, King of Navarre, was the ancestor of the royal dynasties of France and Spain, and of the House of Orléans, while his youngest son Louis I, Prince of Condé, was the ancestor of the House of Condé. A cadet branch of the Condés was the House of Conti, who in male line descended of Henri, Prince of Condé (1588–1646).

In an edict of July 1714, Louis XIV declared his legitimized sons, the Duke of Maine and Count of Toulouse, to be princes du sang and accorded them rights of succession to the French throne following all other princes du sang. Though the Parlement de Paris refused to register the decree, the king exercised his right to compel registration by conducting a lit de justice. The edict was revoked and annulled on 18 August 1715 by the Parlement on the authority of the regent after the king's death. As a chancellor of Louis XIV had warned, a king could only produce princes of the blood with the queen.

== Styles ==
Those who held this rank were usually styled by their main ducal peerage, but sometimes other titles were used, indicating a more precise status than prince du sang.

The most senior princes used specific styles such as monsieur le prince or monsieur le duc, whereas the junior princes used the style monseigneur followed by their noble title, such as monseigneur le duc de Montpensier. The style Serene Highness (altesse sérénissime) was used in writing only.

== Monsieur le Prince ==
Monsieur le Prince was the style of the First Prince of the Blood (French: premier prince du sang), which normally belonged to the most senior (by agnatic primogeniture) male member of the royal dynasty who was not in the present king's line, neither a fils de France ("son of France", i.e. of the King or the Dauphin") nor a petit-fils de France ("grandson of France", son of a fils de France). As his descent from a prior monarch went back generations, in practice, it was not always clear who was entitled to the rank and thus succession to the throne should the main line fail, and it often took a specific act of the king to make the determination.

The rank carried with it various privileges, including the right to a household paid out of state revenues. The rank was held for life: the birth of a new, more senior prince who qualified for the position did not deprive the current holder of his use of the style. The Princes of Condé used the style of Monsieur le Prince for over a century (1589–1709). The right to use the style passed to the House of Orléans in 1709; however, they seldom if ever used it. The title should theoretically have passed in 1752 to Prince Philip, Duke of Calabria, the first great-grandson of the Grand Dauphin that was neither a fils de France nor a petit-fils de France; however, Louis XV left the title to the House of Orléans rather than to the Spanish branch of the Bourbons, which had renounced its right to succeed to the French throne by the Treaty of Utrecht. This meant that Louis Philippe, duke of Orleans in the late 18th century, was the First Prince of the Blood immediately before the French Revolution, entitling him to sit on various bodies, such as the 1787 Assembly of Notables, which he used as a platform to advocate liberal reforms.

=== First Princes of the Blood, 1465–1830 ===
Prince	Became Prince	Ceased to be Prince		Relation to Previous Prince	Relation to Monarch	Monarch
Prince	Became Prince	Date	Reason	Relation to Previous Prince	Relation to Monarch	Monarch
Louis II House of Valois-Orléans Other titles List: Duke of Orléans; Duke of Valois; Count of Blois	1465	7 April 1498	Became King of France	–	2nd Cousin	Louis XI
Louis II House of Valois-Orléans Other titles List: Duke of Orléans; Duke of Valois; Count of Blois	1465	7 April 1498	Became King of France	–	2nd Cousin once removed	Charles VIII
Francis House of Valois-Angoulême Other titles List: Duke of Brittany; Duke of Valois; Count of Angoulême	7 April 1498	1 January 1515	Became King of France	1st Cousin once removed		Louis XII
Charles IV House of Valois-Alençon Other titles List: Duke of Alençon; Count of Perche	1 January 1515	11 April 1525	Died	5th Cousin once removed		Francis I
Charles III House of Bourbon-Montpensier Other titles List: Duke of Bourbon; Duke of Auvergne; Count of Montpensier; Count of Clermont	11 April 1525	6 May 1527	Died	7th Cousin	7th Cousin once removed	Francis I
Charles House of Bourbon-Vendôme Other titles List: Duke of Vendôme	6 May 1527	25 March 1537	Died	7th Cousin once removed	8th Cousin	Francis I
Antoine House of Bourbon-Vendôme Other titles List: King of Navarre; Duke of Vendôme	25 March 1537	17 November 1562	Died	Son	8th Cousin once removed	Francis I
Antoine House of Bourbon-Vendôme Other titles List: King of Navarre; Duke of Vendôme	25 March 1537	17 November 1562	Died	Son	9th Cousin	Henry II
Antoine House of Bourbon-Vendôme Other titles List: King of Navarre; Duke of Vendôme	25 March 1537	17 November 1562	Died	Son	9th Cousin once removed	Francis II
Antoine House of Bourbon-Vendôme Other titles List: King of Navarre; Duke of Vendôme	25 March 1537	17 November 1562	Died	Son	9th Cousin once removed	Charles IX
Henry House of Bourbon-Vendôme Other titles List: King of Navarre; Duke of Vendôme; Duke of Albret; Count of Foix	17 November 1562	2 August 1589	Became King of France	Son	10th Cousin	Charles IX
Henry House of Bourbon-Vendôme Other titles List: King of Navarre; Duke of Vendôme; Duke of Albret; Count of Foix	17 November 1562	2 August 1589	Became King of France	Son	10th Cousin	Henry III
Charles House of Bourbon-Vendôme Other titles List: Archbishop of Rouen; Primate of Normandy	2 August 1589	9 May 1590	Died	Uncle		Henry IV
Henry II House of Bourbon-Condé Other titles List: Prince of Condé	9 May 1590	26 December 1646	Died	Grandnephew	1st Cousin once removed	Henry IV
Henry II House of Bourbon-Condé Other titles List: Prince of Condé	9 May 1590	26 December 1646	Died	Grandnephew	2nd Cousin	Louis XIII
Henry II House of Bourbon-Condé Other titles List: Prince of Condé	9 May 1590	26 December 1646	Died	Grandnephew	2nd Cousin once removed	Louis XIV
Louis II House of Bourbon-Condé Other titles List: Prince of Condé	26 December 1646	11 December 1686	Died	Son	3rd Cousin	Louis XIV
Henry III House of Bourbon-Condé Other titles List: Prince of Condé	11 November 1686	11 April 1709	Died	Son	3rd Cousin once removed	Louis XIV
Louis House of Bourbon-Orléans Other titles List: Duke of Orléans; Duke of Chartres	11 April 1709	2 December 1723	Died	4th Cousin once removed	Grandnephew	Louis XIV
Louis House of Bourbon-Orléans Other titles List: Duke of Orléans; Duke of Chartres	11 April 1709	2 December 1723	Died	4th Cousin once removed	2nd Cousin once removed	Louis XV
Louis Philippe I House of Bourbon-Orléans Other titles List: Duke of Orléans; Duke of Chartres	2 December 1723	18 November 1785	Died	Son	3rd Cousin	Louis XV
Louis Philippe I House of Bourbon-Orléans Other titles List: Duke of Orléans; Duke of Chartres	2 December 1723	18 November 1785	Died	Son	3rd Cousin twice removed	Louis XVI
Louis Philippe II House of Bourbon-Orléans Other titles List: Duke of Orléans; Duke of Chartres	18 November 1785	21 September 1792	Abolition of the Monarchy	Son	4th Cousin once removed	Louis XVI
French Revolutionary and Napoleonic Wars
Louis Philippe III House of Bourbon-Orléans Other titles List: Duke of Orléans; Duke of Chartres	3 May 1814	20 March 1815	Abolition of the Monarchy	Son	5th Cousin	Louis XVIII
War of the Seventh Coalition
Louis Philippe III House of Bourbon-Orléans Other titles List: Duke of Orléans; Duke of Chartres	8 July 1815	9 August 1830	Proclaimed as King of the French	Son	5th Cousin	Louis XVIII
Louis Philippe III House of Bourbon-Orléans Other titles List: Duke of Orléans; Duke of Chartres	8 July 1815	9 August 1830	Proclaimed as King of the French	Son	5th Cousin	Charles X

== Madame la Princesse ==
This style was held by the wife of Monsieur le Prince. The duchesses/princesses that were entitled to use it were1646–1686: Claire-Clémence de Maillé-Brézé (1628–1694). Niece of Cardinal Richelieu and wife of the Grand Condé, she was also the Duchess of Fronsac in her own right from 1646 to 1674.

- 1684–1709: Anna Henrietta Julia of Bavaria (1648–1723). She was the daughter of Anna Gonzaga and her husband Charles I, Duke of Mantua. In 1663 she married Henry Jules, Duke of Bourbon the son and heir of the Grand Condé. Anne Henriette was the mother of Louis III, Prince of Condé and Madame la Princesse de Conti Seconde Douairière
- 1709–1723: Françoise-Marie de Bourbon (1677–1749) – wife of Philippe II, Duke of Orléans
- 1724–1726: Margravine Auguste Marie Johanna of Baden-Baden (1704–1726) – wife of Louis of Orléans
- 1743–1759: Louise Henriette de Bourbon – daughter of Madame la Princesse de Conti Dernière Douairière and wife of Louis Philippe d'Orléans, Duke of Orléans
- 1785–1793: Louise Marie Adélaïde de Bourbon (1753–1821); wife of Louis Philippe Joseph d'Orléans, Duke of Orléans. She was the last holder of the style before the outbreak of the French Revolution.
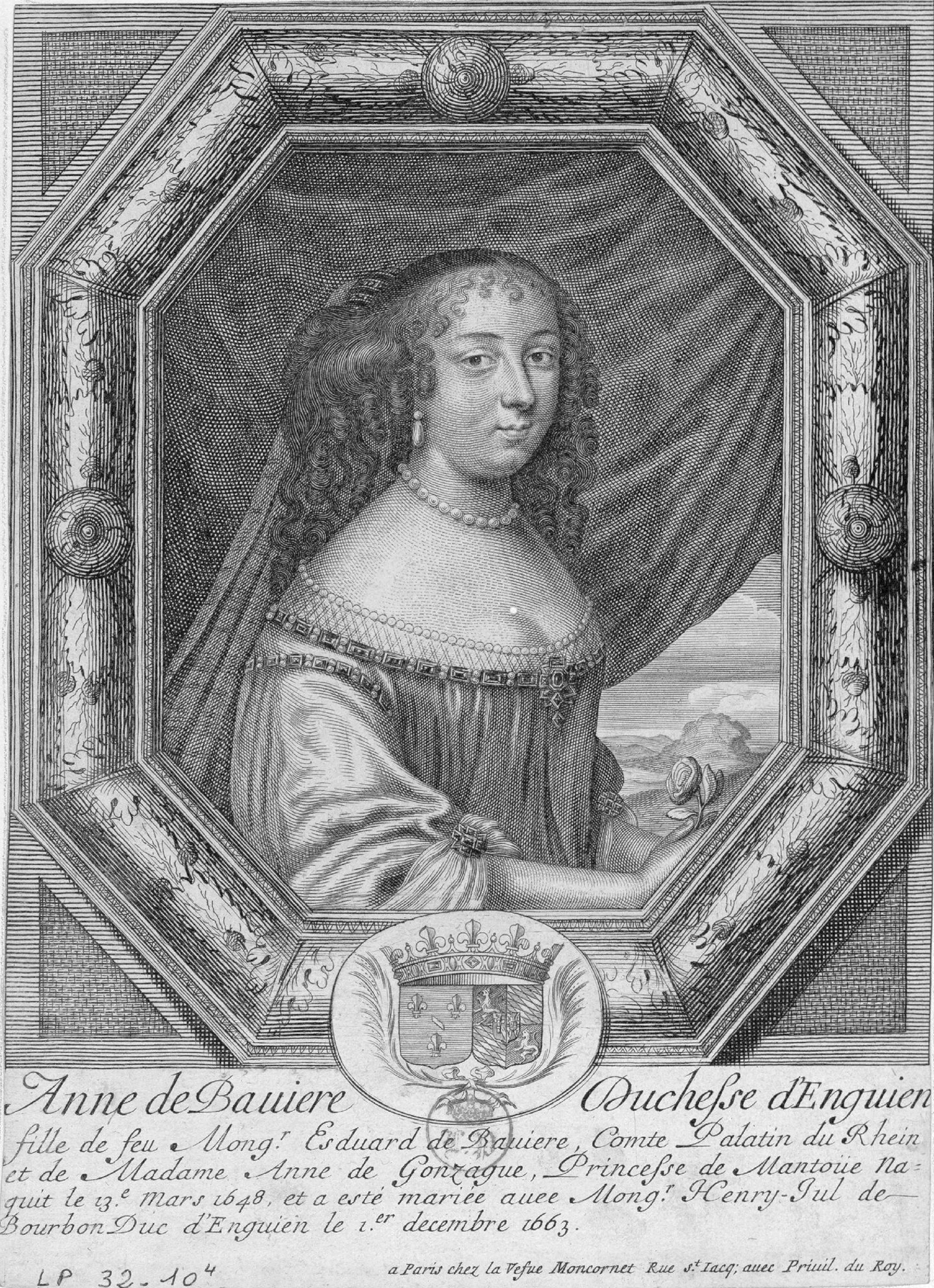
Anne Henriette of Bavaria

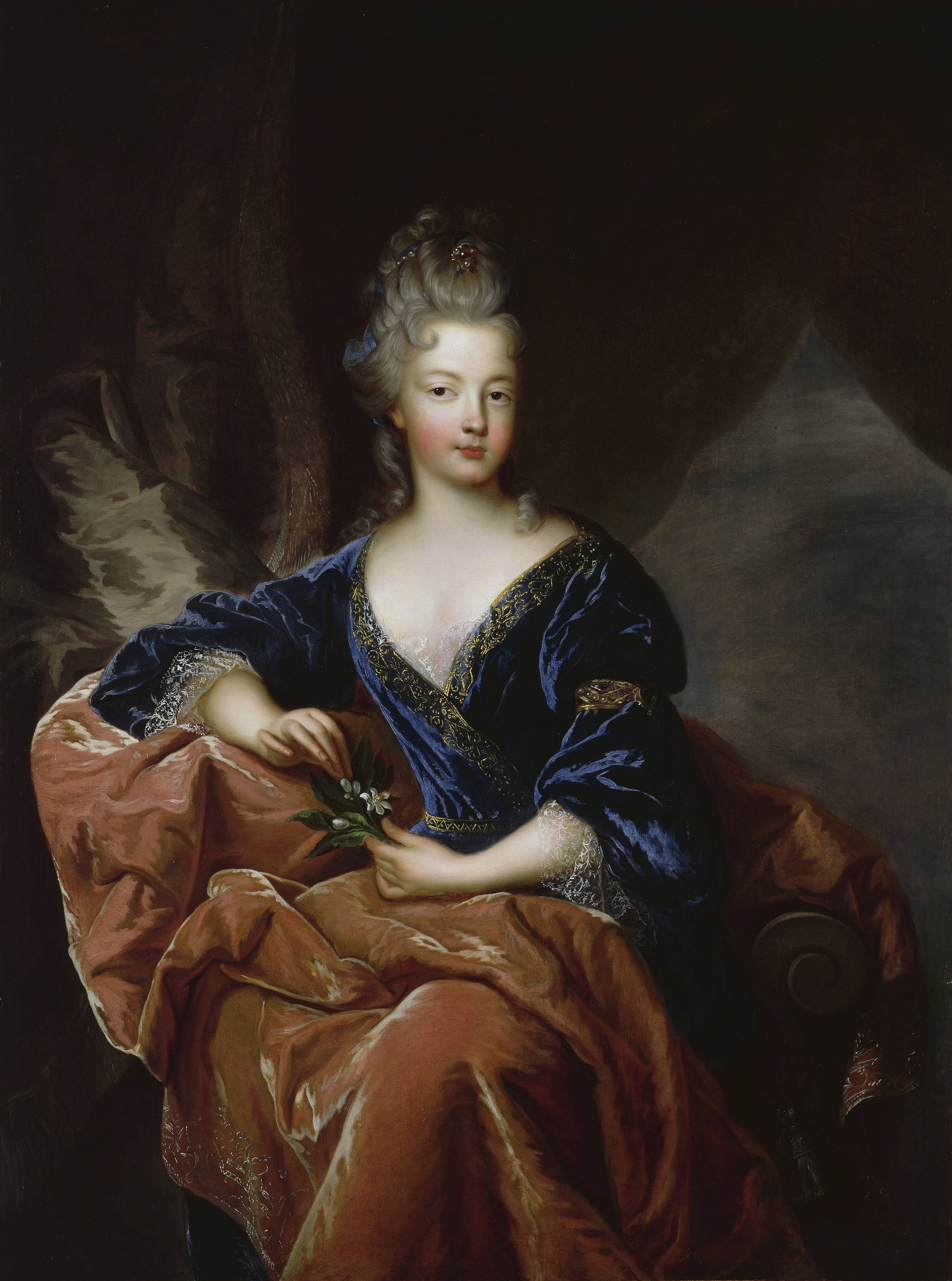
Françoise-Marie de Bourbon, did not use the style as her husband did not.

Louise Henriette de Bourbon, mother of Philippe Égalité

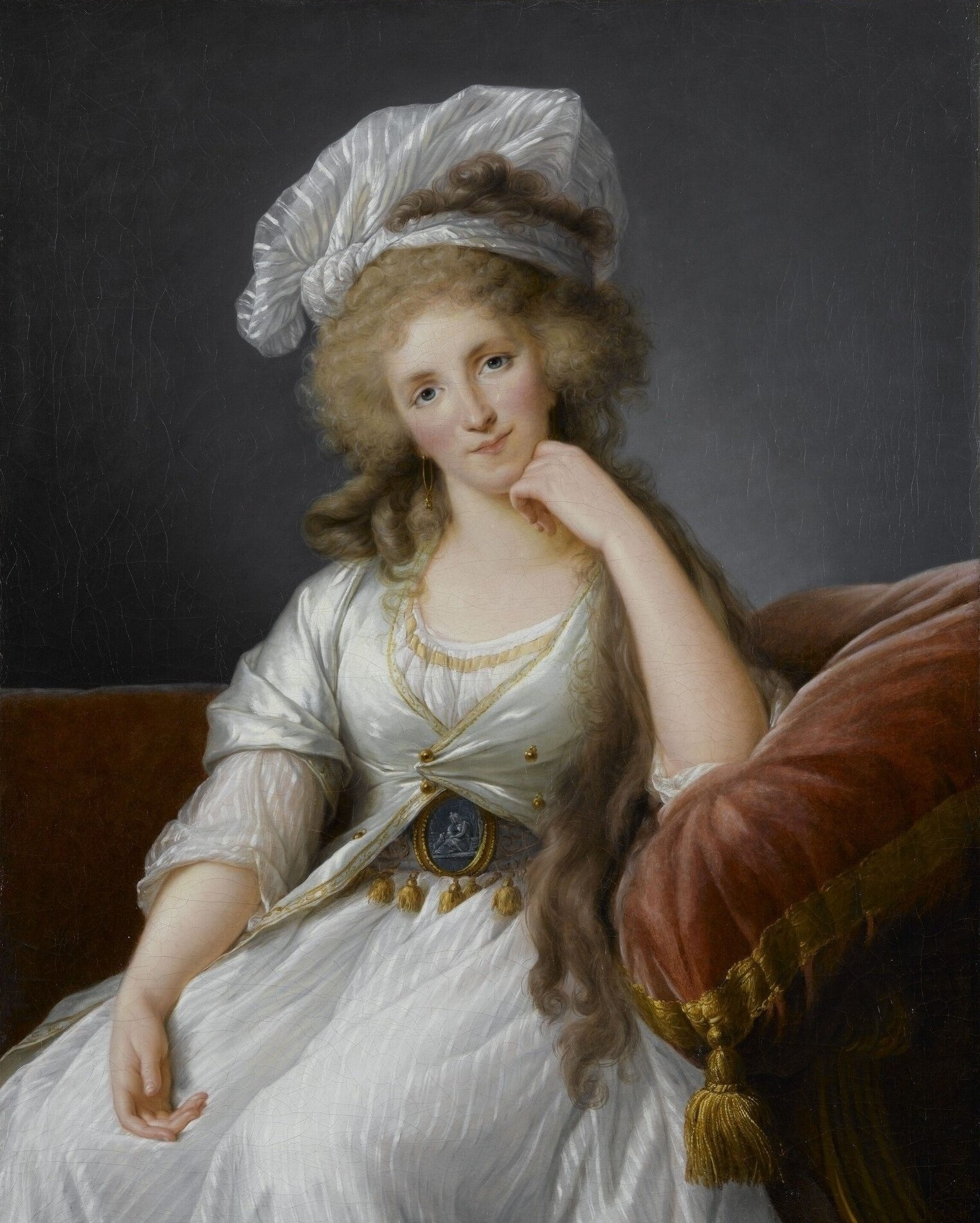
Madame la Princesse – wife of Philippe Égalité.

== Monsieur le Duc ==
This style was used for the eldest son of the Prince de Condé. Originally, the eldest son was given the title of Duc d'Enghien, but that changed in 1709 when the Condés lost the rank of premier prince. After that, the eldest son was often given the courtesy title of Duc de Bourbon, which had been granted to le Grand Condé, and his eldest son was then given the title of duc d'Enghien.

1. 1689–1709: Henri I, Duke of Enghien (1643–1709);
2. 1709–1710: Louis I, Duke of Enghien (1668–1710);
3. 1710–1740: Louis II Henri, Duke of Enghien (1692–1740);
4. 1740–1818: Louis III Joseph, Duke of Enghien (1736–1818);
5. 1818–1830: Louis IV Henri, Duke of Enghien (1756–1830).
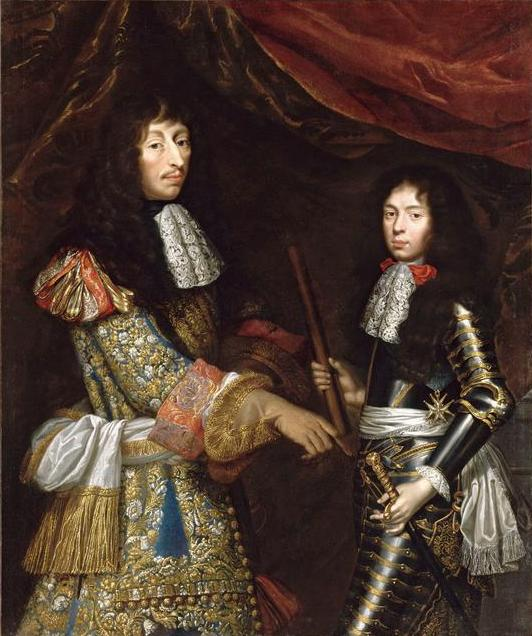
le Grand Condé with his son Henri I, Duke of Enghien

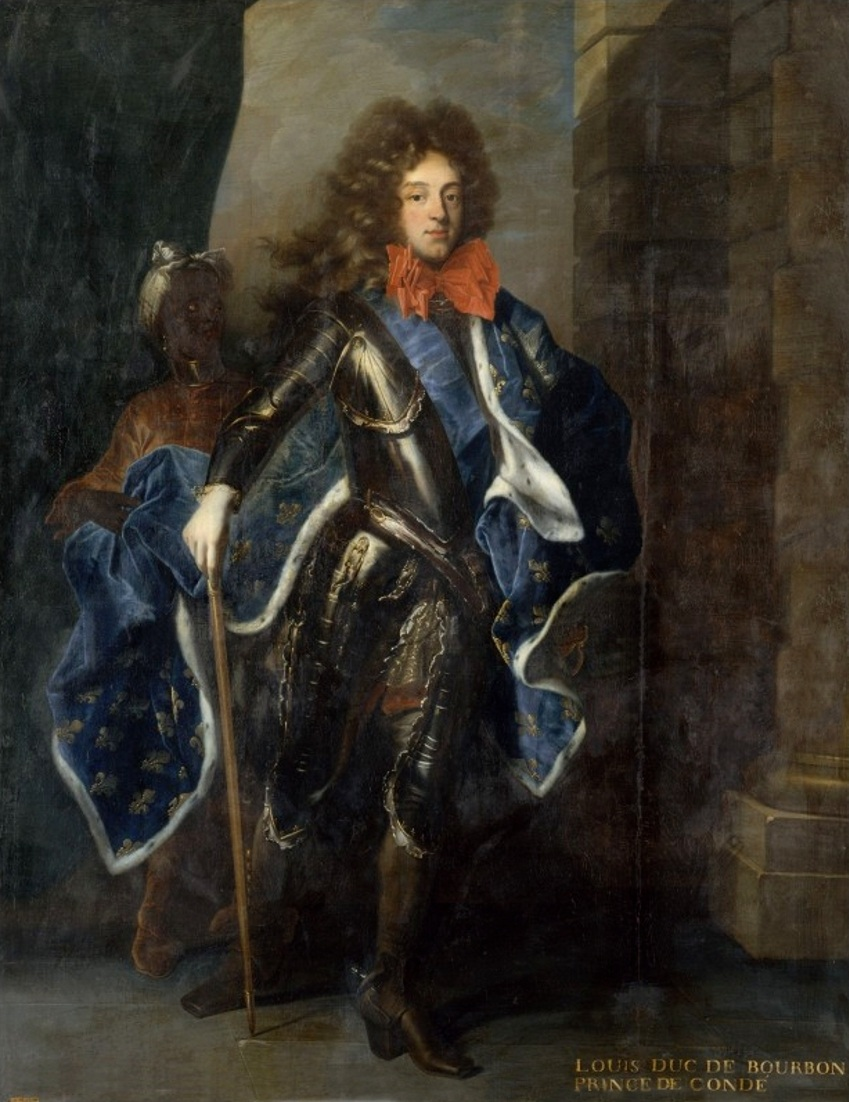
Monsieur le Duc

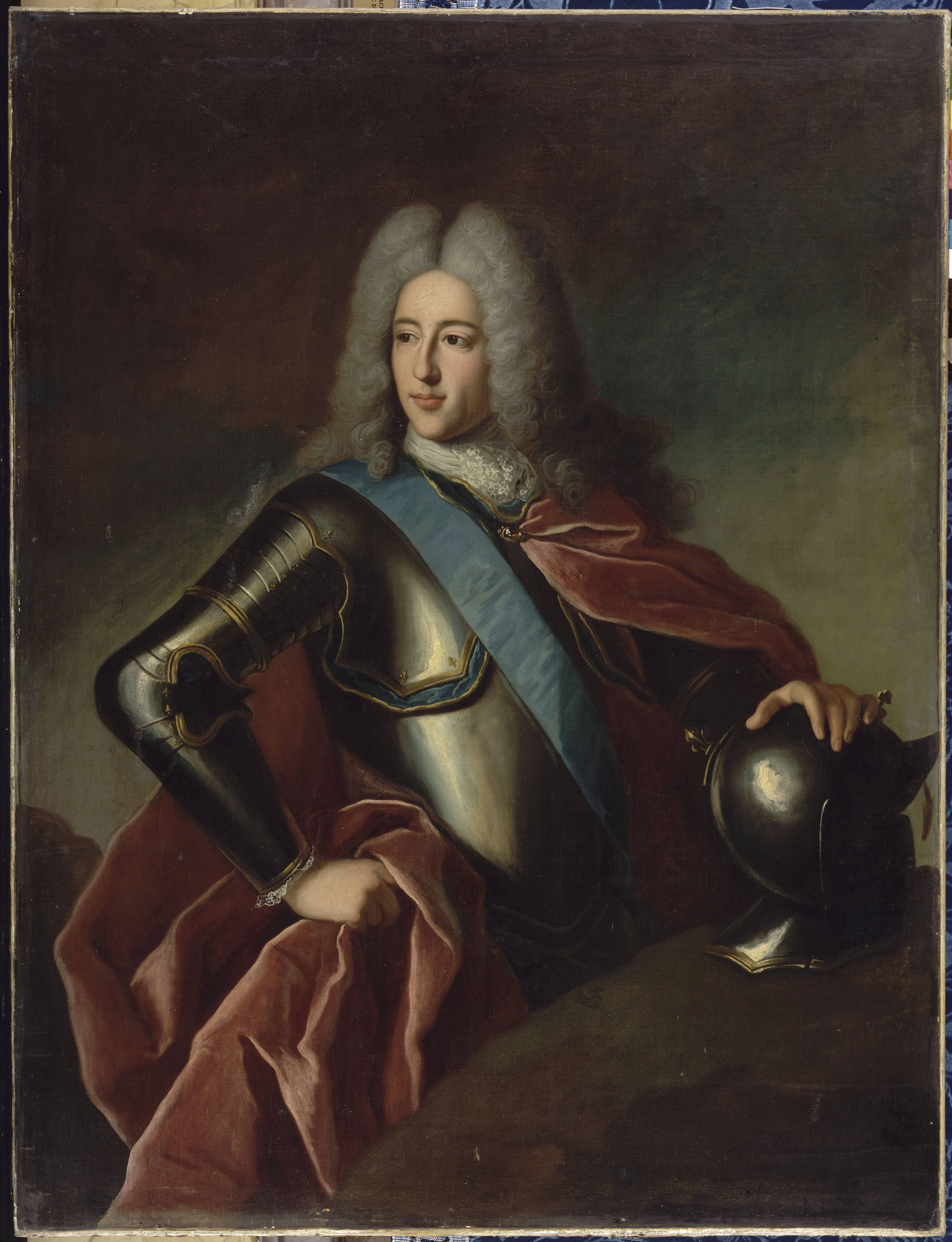
Monsieur le Duc as son of Louis III, Prince of Condé

== Madame la Duchesse ==
This style was used for the wife of Monsieur le Duc. The most famous holder of this honorific was:

- 1685–1709: Louise-Françoise de Bourbon (1673–1743) – The illegitimate daughter of Louis XIV and his mistress, Madame de Montespan, she was married in May 1685, to Louis III, Prince of Condé, then known by the courtesy title of duc de Bourbon. Since his style at court was Monsieur le Duc, she became known as Madame la Duchesse. She later held onto the style even in her widowhood when she was the Princess of Condé. She was later known as Madame la Duchesse Douairière.

Others included:

- 1713–1720: Marie Anne de Bourbon (1689–1720) – first wife of Louis Henri, Duke of Bourbon;
- 1728–1741: Landgravine Caroline of Hesse-Rotenburg (1714–1741) second wife of the Duke of Bourbon;
- 1753–1760: Charlotte Élisabeth Godefride de Rohan (1737–1760) – wife of Louis Joseph, Prince of Condé
- 1770–1818: Louise Marie Thérèse Bathilde d'Orléans (1750–1820) – wife of the last Prince of Condé.
Madame la Duchesse. She was the wife of Monsieur le Duc

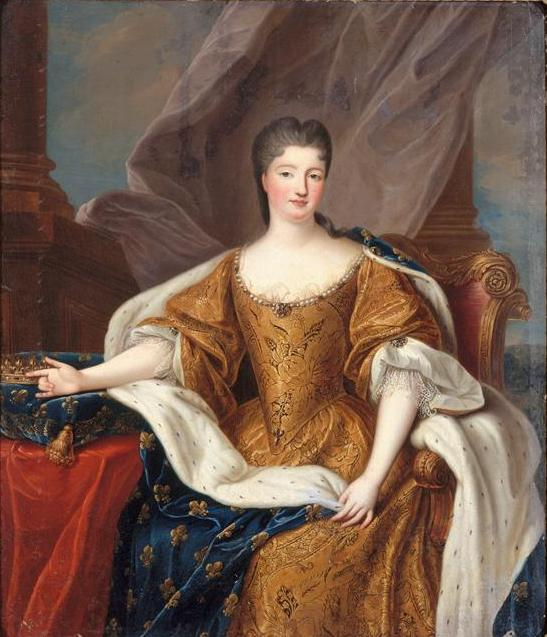
Marie Anne, Princess of Condé; Madame la Duchesse due to the Condé loss of Mme la Princesse to the House of Orléans

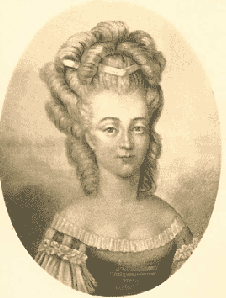
Bathilde d'Orléans

== Monsieur le Comte ==
This address was used by the head of the most junior branch of the House of Bourbon, the comte de Soissons. The comtes de Soissons, like the Princes of Conti, descended from the Princes of Condé. The line started in 1566 when the Soissons title was given to Charles de Bourbon, the second son of Louis I de Bourbon, prince de Condé, the first Prince of Condé.

The first Prince had three sons:

- Henri de Bourbon, second Prince of Condé;
- Charles de Bourbon, first Count of Soissons and the founder of the House of Bourbon-Soissons
- François de Bourbon, Prince de Conti, first Prince of Conti but the Conti title lapsed upon his death in 1614 without legitimate heirs. It was later revived in 1629 for Armand de Bourbon, prince de Conti, the second son of Henry II, Prince of Condé.

The Soissons title was acquired by the first Prince of Condé in 1557 and was held by his descendants for two more generations:

- Charles, Count of Soissons
- Louis, Count of Soissons
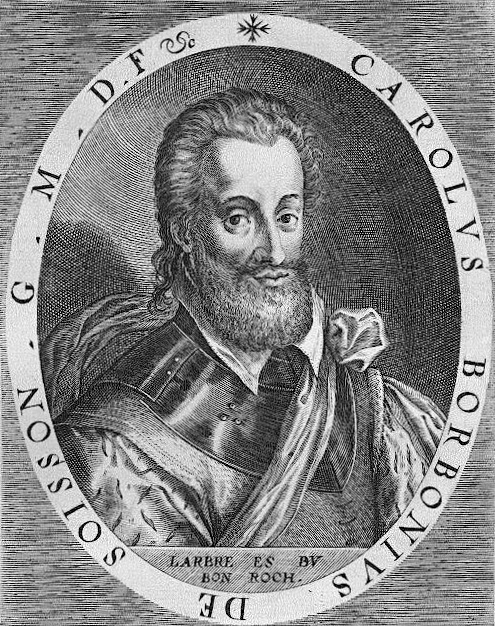
Charles de Bourbon, Count of Soissons

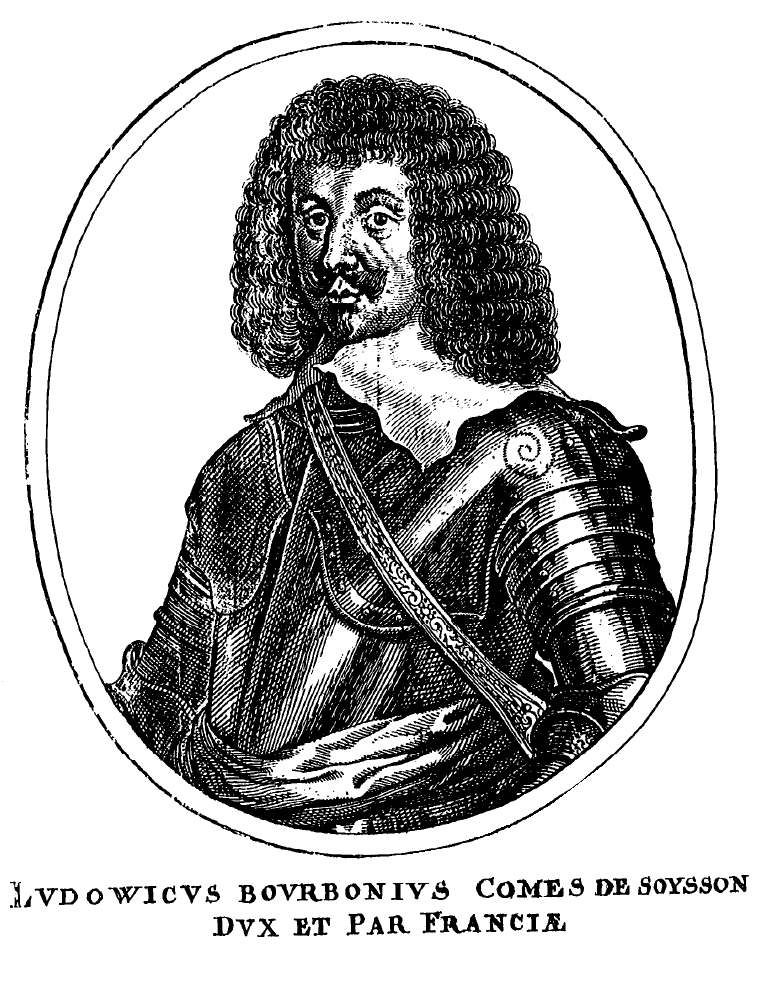
Louis de Bourbon, Count of Soissons

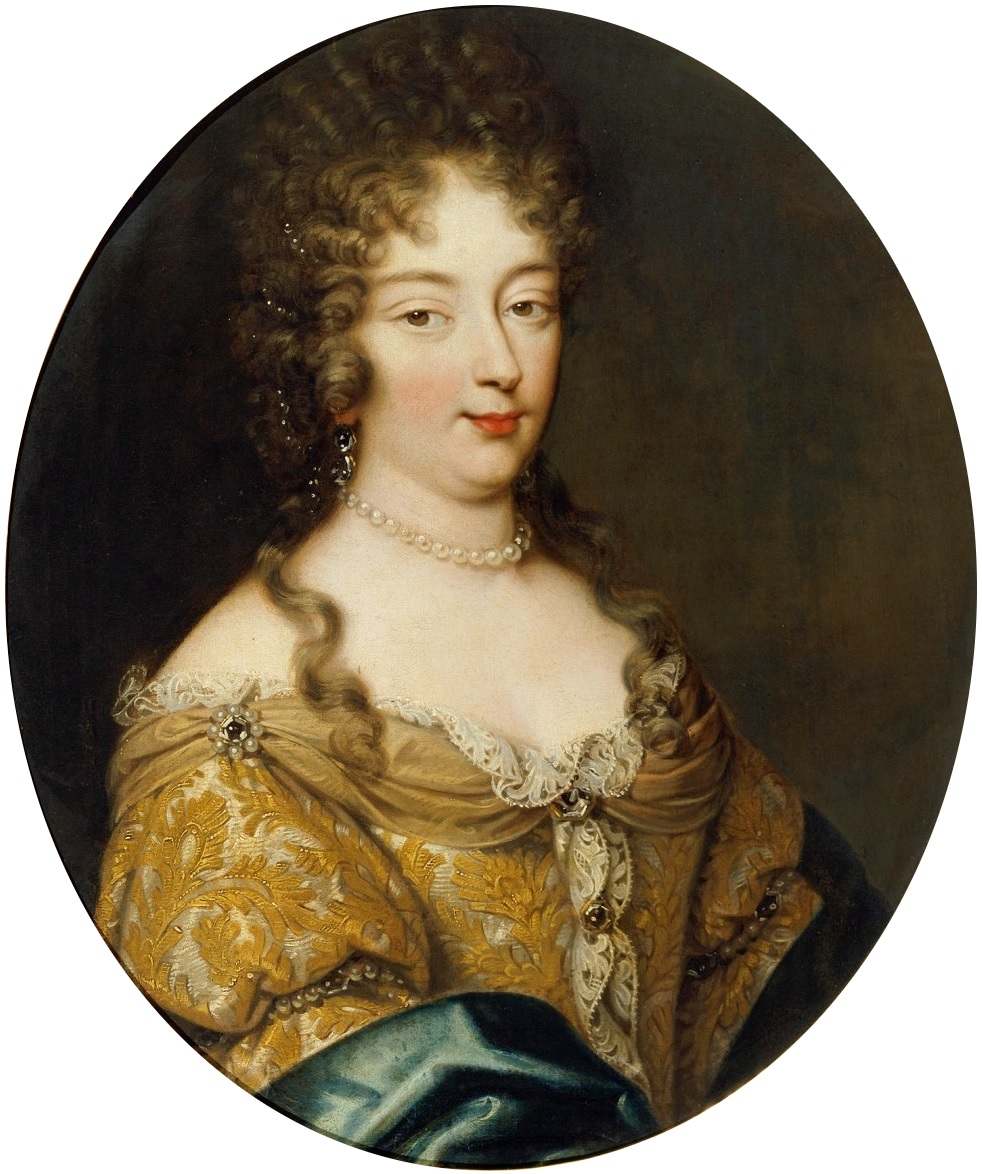
Olympia Mancini, known as Madame la Comtesse at court

The 2nd Count of Soissons died without an heir, so the Soissons title passed to his younger sister, Marie de Bourbon, the wife of Thomas Francis, Prince of Carignano, a member of the House of Savoy. She became known as Madame la comtesse de Soissons. On her death, the title passed first to her second son, Prince Joseph-Emmanuel of Savoy-Carignan (1631–1656), and then to her third son, Prince Eugène-François of Savoy-Carignan.

He married Olympia Mancini, niece of Cardinal Mazarin. She was known as Madame la Comtesse de Soissons like her mother-in-law. On his death, the title went to his eldest son, Prince Louis-Thomas, who was the older brother of the famous Austrian general, Prince Eugene of Savoy. The Soissons title became extinct upon the death of Prince Eugène-Jean of Savoy-Carignan in 1734.

== Madame la Comtesse ==
This style was used by the wife of Monsieur le Comte. The best example of this is Olympia Mancini.

== Madame la Princesse Douairière ==
In order to tell the wives of the various Princes of Conti apart after their deaths, the widows were given the name of Douairière (or dowager) and a number corresponding to when they lost their husband. After being widowed their full style would be Madame la Princesse de Conti 'number' Douairière. Between 1727 and 1732, there were three widowed Princesses de Conti. They were:

- Marie Anne de Bourbon (1666–1739), the legitimised daughter of Louis XIV and Louise de La Vallière; she was the wife of Louis Armand I, Prince of Conti. She was known as Madame la Princesse de Conti Première Douairière as she was the first to be widowed, in 1685. The title went to her husband's younger brother, François Louis, Prince of Conti.
- Marie Thérèse de Bourbon (1666–1732), the wife of François Louis, Prince of Conti; she was known as Madame la Princesse de Conti Seconde Douairière after losing her husband in 1709.
- Louise Élisabeth de Bourbon (1693–1775), the wife of Louis Armand II, Prince of Conti, the son and successor of François Louis, Prince of Conti. She was the daughter of Monsieur le Duc and Madame la Duchesse. After her husband died in 1727, she was known as Madame la Princesse de Conti Troisième/Dernière Douairière. This was not a traditional style by right but was simply a means the court used to distinguish between the three widows who held the title of Princesse de Conti at the same time.
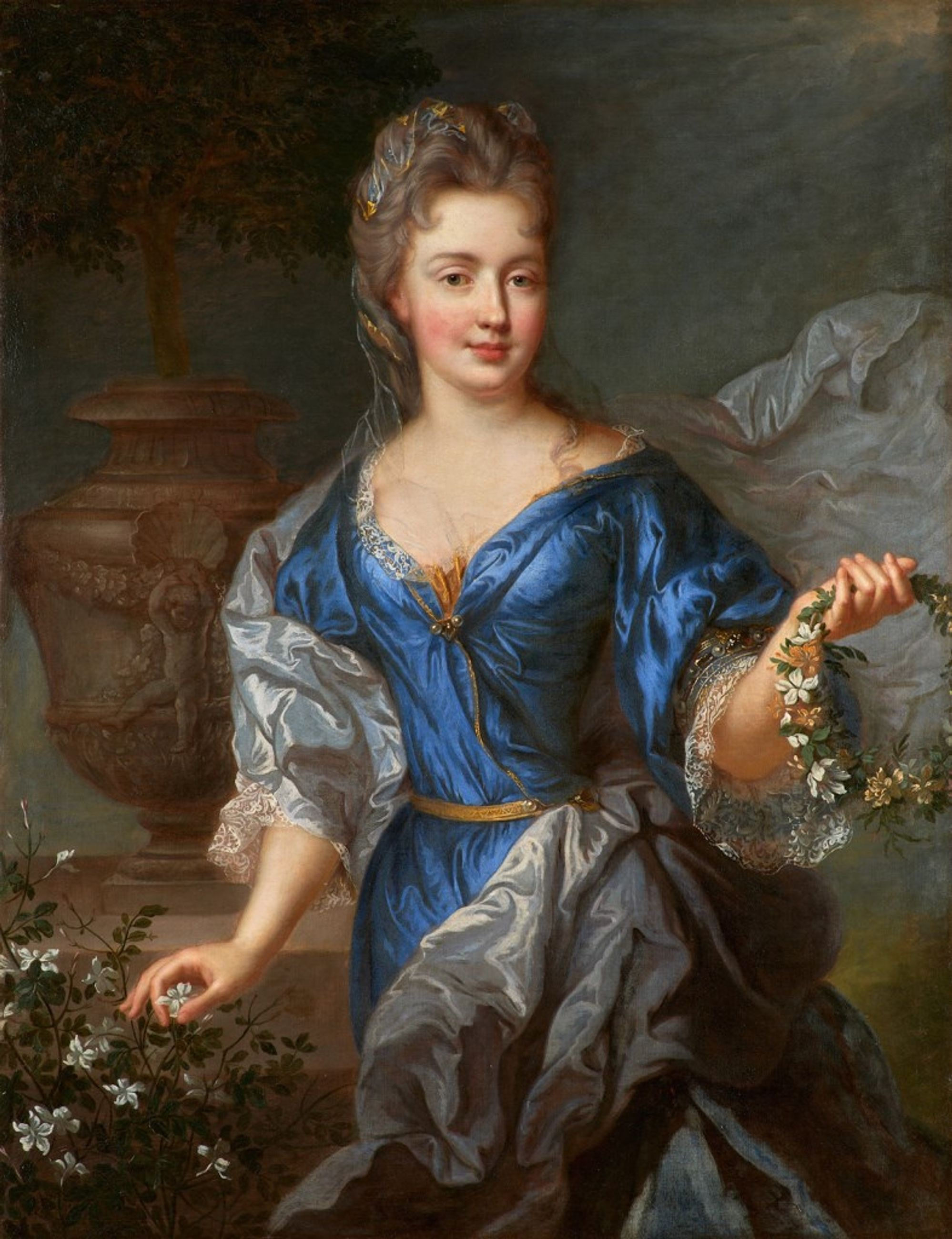
Madame la Princesse de Conti Première Douairière

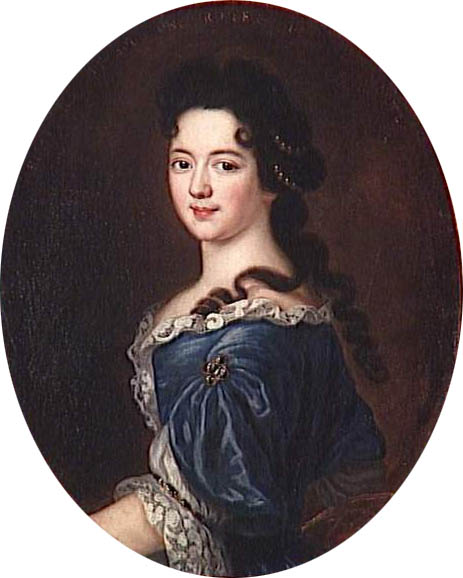
Madame la Princesse de Conti Seconde Douairière

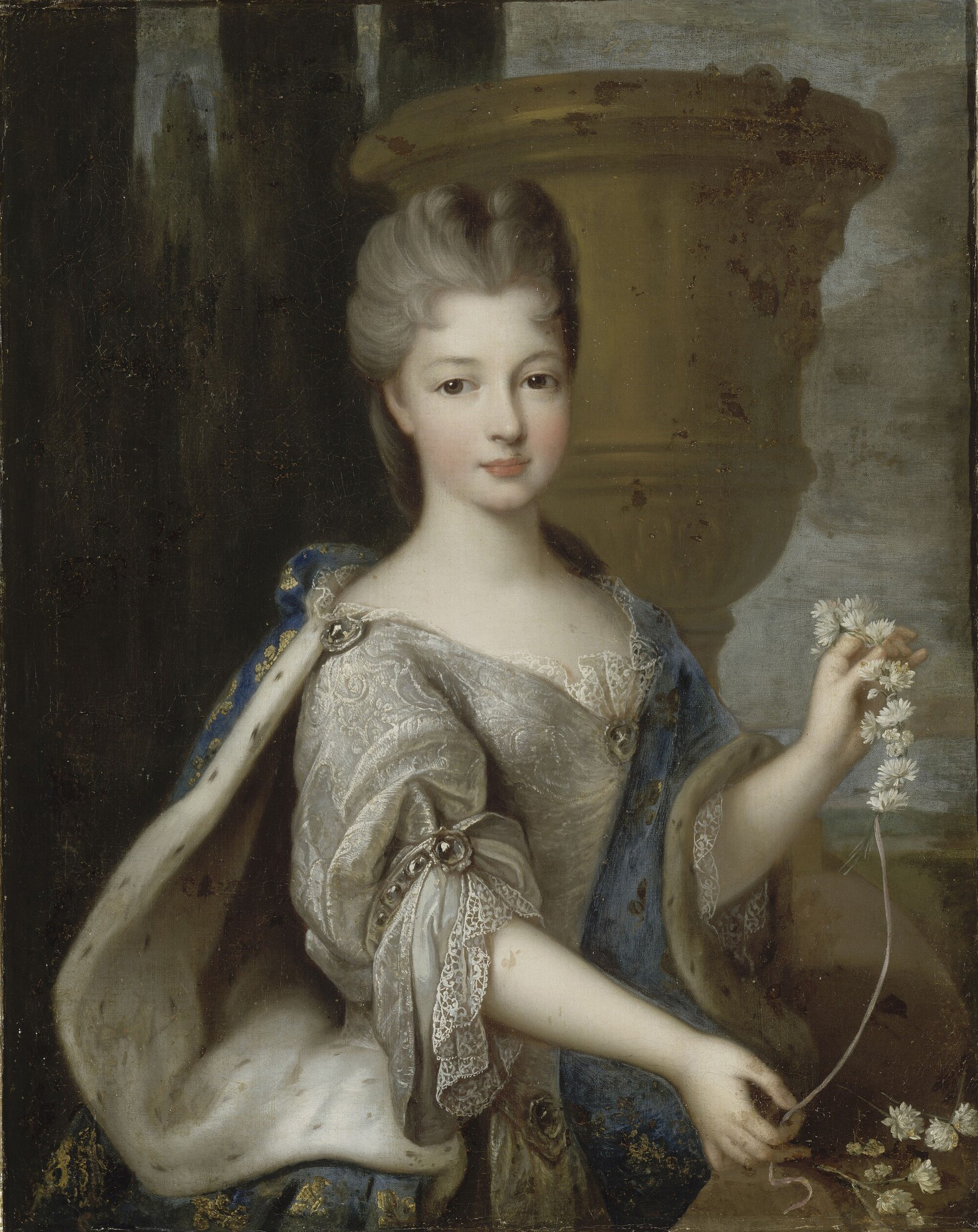
Madame la Princesse de Conti Dernière Douairière

== Legitimised royal offspring ==
Legitimised children of the King of France, and of other males of his dynasty, took surnames according to the branch of the House of Capet to which their father belonged, e.g. Louis-Auguste de Bourbon, duc du Maine, was the elder son of Louis XIV by his mistress, Madame de Montespan. After the legitimisation occurred, the child was given a title. Males were given titles from their father's lands and estates and females were given the style of Mademoiselle de X. Examples of this are (children of Louis XIV and Mme de Montespan):

- Louise Françoise de Bourbon (1669–1672);
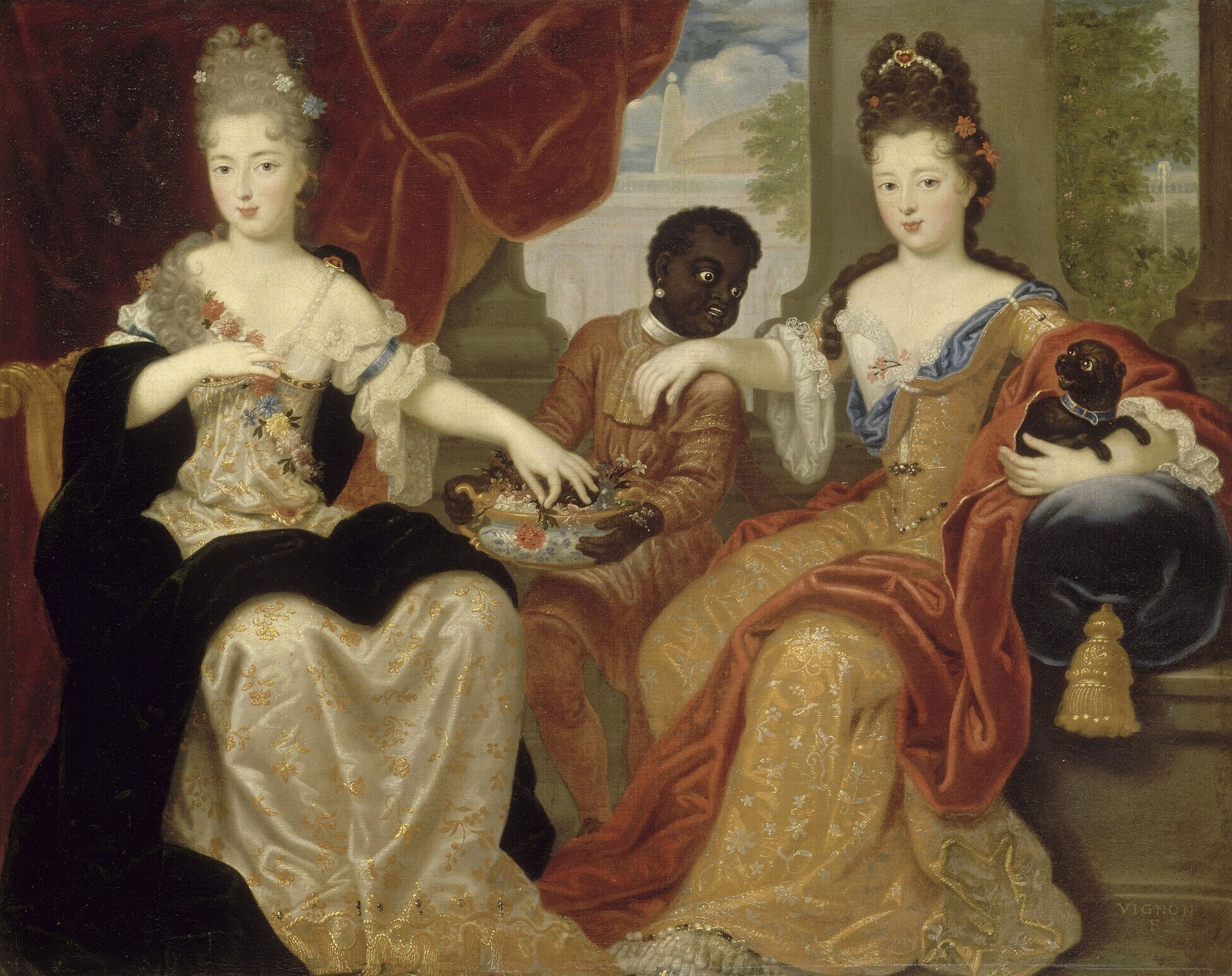
  The sisters Mademoiselle de Blois and Mademoiselle de Nantes, two legitimised daughters of Louis XIV and Mme de Montespan, with an enslaved Black attendant
- Louis-Auguste de Bourbon (1670–1736), titled duc du Maine – later married Anne-Louise-Bénédicte de Bourbon-Condé.
- Louis César de Bourbon (1672–1683), titled comte de Vexin;
- Louise Françoise de Bourbon (1673–1743), titled Mademoiselle de Nantes – later wife of Louis III de Bourbon-Condé, prince de Condé
- Louise Marie Anne de Bourbon (1674–1681), titled Mademoiselle de Tours;
- Françoise Marie de Bourbon (1677–1749), titled Mademoiselle de Blois – wife of Philippe II d'Orléans, duc d'Orléans.
- Louis-Alexandre de Bourbon (1678–1737), titled comte de Toulouse – later married to Marie Victoire de Noailles.

Also the child would be referred to as Légitimé de Bourbon or de France. The feminine version of this is Légitimée de Bourbon or de France. Notable examples such as Marie Anne légitimée de Bourbon, mademoiselle de Blois daughter of Louis XIV and Louise de La Vallière. Her full brother was Louis de Bourbon, later given the title of comte de Vermandois.

== Orléans-Longueville ==
The branch of the ducs de Longueville, extinct in 1672 (1694), bore the surname d'Orléans, as legitimised descendants of Jean, bâtard d'Orléans, the natural son of a Valois prince who held the appanage of Orléans before the Bourbons did. Non-legitimised natural children of royalty took whatever surname the king permitted, which might or might not be that of the dynasty.

Children born out of wedlock to a French king or prince were never recognised as fils de France. However, if they were legitimised, the king might raise them to a rank just below or even equivalent to that of a prince du sang.

== See also ==
- House of Condé
- Princes of Orléans
- Prince étranger
- Prinz, esp. in contrast to Fürst
