= Princes of Orléans =

In the history of France, the Princes of Orléans were male-line descendants of the House of Orléans headed by the Duke of Orléans. The present House of Orléans was founded by Philippe de France, duc d'Orléans, known as Monsieur and the only sibling of Louis XIV.

The children of Philippe de France held the rank of 'Grandchildren of France', being male-line descendants of Louis XIII, the father of Louis XIV and Monsieur. This allowed that group of people the style of Royal Highness; this was from the reign of Louis XIII.

After 1723, members of the House of Orléans took the style of Serene Highness and thus ranked as 'Princes of the Blood'. At the French court, these princes outranked their cousins the Princes of Condé and the Princes of Conti, older branches of the House of Bourbon that ruled France from 1589 beginning with Henry IV until the end of the Revolution during the reign of Louis XVI.

The title of Prince of Orléans, although not a de facto style, has generally been restricted to the following persons – the legitimate sons of a Duke of Orléans, and the legitimate male-line descendants of a Duke of Orléans.

== Princes of Orléans (1650–1652) ==
The following male was the son of Gaston, Duke of Orléans, the only surviving brother of Louis XIII. Gaston was created the Duke of Orléans at his first marriage in 1626 to the heiress Marie de Bourbon, Duchess of Montpensier; Marie died in childbirth while Gaston again married again in 1632 to Marguerite de Lorraine.

Name	Birth	Death	Image	Notes
Jean Gaston, Duke of Valois	17 August 1650	10 August 1652		Only son of Gaston and Marguerite; known as the Duke of Valois till his death aged .

== Princes of Orléans (1664–1850) ==
Name	Birth	Death	Image	Notes
Philippe Charles, Duke of Valois	16 July 1664	8 December 1666		son of 'Monsieur' and Henriette Anne Stuart; (died in infancy);
Alexandre Louis, Duke of Valois	2 June 1673	16 March 1676		son of Monsieur and Elizabeth Charlotte of the Palatinate; (died in infancy);
Philippe II, Duke of Orléans le Régent	2 August 1674	2 December 1723		son of Monsieur and Elizabeth Charlotte, Madame Palatine; served as Regent of the Kingdom from 1715 to 1723 in the Régence;
Louis, Duke of Orléans	4 August 1703	4 February 1752		son of Philippe II, Duke of Orléans and Françoise-Marie de Bourbon;
Louis Philippe, Duke of Orléans	12 May 1725	18 November 1785		son of Louis, Duke of Orléans and Margravine Auguste Marie Johanna of Baden-Baden;
Louis Philippe Joseph, Duke of Orléans	13 April 1747	6 November 1793		son of Louis Philippe, Duke of Orléans and Louise Henriette de Bourbon; known as Philippe Égalité;
Louis Philippe, Duke of Orléans; King of the French	6 October 1773	26 August 1850		son of Louis Philippe Joseph and Louise Marie Adélaïde de Bourbon;
Antoine Philippe, Duke of Montpensier	3 July 1775	18 May 1807		son of Louis Philippe Joseph and Louise Marie Adélaïde de Bourbon;
Louis Charles, Count of Beaujolais	7 October 1779	30 May 1808		son of Louis Philippe Joseph and Louise Marie Adélaïde de Bourbon;
