= Peter Courtenay =

Peter Courtenay may refer to:

- Peter Courtenay (bishop) (c. 1432–1492), English bishop and politician
- Sir Peter Courtenay (KG) (1346–1405), soldier and knight
- Sir Peter Courtenay (died 1552), of Ugbrooke, Sheriff of Devon in 1548/9
- Peter Courtenay (cricketer) (1914–1959), English cricketer

== See also ==
- Peter Courtney (disambiguation)
