= Peter Courtney (disambiguation) =

Peter Courtney (1943–2024) was a politician in Oregon, United States.

Peter Courtney may also refer to:

- Peter Courtney (MP) (1616–1670), English politician
- Peter Courtney (boxer) (1867–1896), American boxer in Corbett and Courtney Before the Kinetograph

== See also ==
- Peter Courtenay (disambiguation)
