= Geof Courtenay =

English cricketer

Personal information
- Full name: Geofry William List Courtenay
- Born: 16 December 1921; Castle Cary, Somerset, England
- Died: 17 October 1980 (aged 58); Edinburgh, Scotland
- Batting: Right-handed
- Role: Batsman
- Relatives: Brother, Peter

Domestic team information
- Years: Team
- 1947: Somerset
- 1953: Minor Counties
- 1955–1957: Scotland
- First-class debut: 4 June 1947 Somerset v Sussex
- Last First-class: 17 May 1957 Scotland v Lancashire

Career statistics
Competition	First-class
Matches	8
Runs scored	168
Batting average	12.00
100s/50s	–/1
Top score	69
Balls bowled	–
Wickets	–
Bowling average	–
5 wickets in innings	–
10 wickets in match	–
Best bowling	–
Catches/stumpings	1/–
- Source: CricketArchive, 20 March 2011

Geofry William List Courtenay (16 December 1921 – 17 October 1980) played first-class cricket for Somerset in four matches in the 1947 season. In 1953 he played a single first-class match for a Minor Counties representative side, and between 1955 and 1957 he played for Scotland in three first-class matches. He was born at Castle Cary in Somerset and died at Edinburgh, Scotland. His older brother Peter also played for Somerset.

Courtenay was educated at Sherborne School. As a cricketer, he was a right-handed middle-order batsman. He appeared for Somerset Colts in both 1938 and 1939 and then played one game for Somerset's second eleven in 1939 as an opening batsman. In 1947, he played four times for Somerset's first team, scoring 34 against Sussex in his first first-class innings. He was not successful in his other matches, however, and did not appear for the county again.

From 1952, he played Minor Counties cricket for Dorset regularly for six seasons, and in 1953 made a further first-class appearance for the combined Minor Counties side against the Australians, a very heavy defeat in which the Minor Counties totalled only 118 runs in their two innings combined. As a schoolmaster in Edinburgh, Courtenay also appeared in matches for the Scotland team, three of which were rated as first-class games: in the game against Derbyshire in 1955, he scored 69 in the first innings, and this was the highest score of his first-class career.

At his death in 1980 Courtenay was described as a "schoolmaster".
