= Treaty of Montmartre =

1662 treaty between France and Lorraine

The Treaty of Montmartre was signed on 6 February 1662 between Louis XIV and Duke Charles IV of Lorraine. The treaty was negotiated by Hugues de Lionne. Based on the terms of the accord, Louis XIV was given control of the Duchy of Lorraine, and Charles IV's family would become princes in the French royal family. However, it failed to take hold and Charles IV publicly repudiated it.

== See also ==
- House of Courtenay
- List of treaties
