= Peter Courtenay (cricketer) =

English cricketer

Personal information
- Full name: Peter Jeofry Searle Courtenay
- Born: 11 March 1914; Weymouth, Dorset, England
- Died: 7 April 1959 (aged 45); Broadstone, Dorset, England
- Batting: Right-handed
- Role: Batsman
- Relatives: Brother, Geof

Domestic team information
- Years: Team
- 1934: Somerset
- First-class debut: 30 June 1934 Somerset v Derbyshire
- Last First-class: 6 July 1934 Somerset v Essex

Career statistics
Competition	First-class
Matches	2
Runs scored	15
Batting average	3.75
100s/50s	–/–
Top score	9
Balls bowled	–
Wickets	–
Bowling average	–
5 wickets in innings	–
10 wickets in match	–
Best bowling	–
Catches/stumpings	2/–
- Source: CricketArchive, 20 March 2011

Peter Jeofry Searle Courtenay (11 March 1914 – 7 April 1959) played first-class cricket for Somerset in two matches in the 1934 season. He was born at Weymouth in Dorset and died at Broadstone, also in Dorset. His younger brother Geofry also played for Somerset.

Educated at Marlborough College, Courtenay played as a lower-order right-handed batsman in two matches inside a week for Somerset, but was not successful, failing to reach double figures in any of his four first-class innings.

In the Second World War, he is recorded in The London Gazette as being commissioned as a 2nd Lieutenant in the Army in Burma Reserve of Officers (ABRO). In 1959, he killed himself with a shotgun while suffering from depression.
