= Renaud de Courtenay =

French nobleman

Renaud de Courtenay, (d. 1160) was seigneur of Courtenay and fought in the Second Crusade with Louis VII of France. His fate is unknown, either losing his lands from an argument with Louis VII or dying on crusade and his lands going to his daughter Elizabeth's husband, Peter.

== Life ==
Renaud was the son of Miles (Milo) de Courtenay, Seigneur of Courtenay and his wife Ermengard de Nevers. He succeeded his father as Seigneur of Courtenay and fought in the Second Crusade with King Louis VII of France.

According to Suger, Renaud argued with King Louis VII, who seized Renaud's possessions and gave them to his youngest brother, Pierre (Peter) of France, who thenceforth became known as Peter I of Courtenay. Nicholas Vincent states that Renaud in all probability died on crusade and that his daughter Elizabeth married Peter who inherited Courtenay lands.

== Marriages and issue ==
Renaud and his first wife Helvise du Donjon had:

- Renaud II de Courtenay, (b. 1125 – d. 27 September 1194) who in 1172, accompanied King Henry II of England on the Irish Expedition to Wexford. He married Hawise de Curcy, heiress of the feudal barony of Okehampton in Devon, and half sister to his father's second wife, Maud du Sap. Through the marriage, he acquired Okehampton Castle.
- Elizabeth de Courtenay (b. 1127 – d. September 1205), who was given in marriage by the French king Louis VII to his youngest brother, Peter of France, who thenceforth became known as "Peter I of Courtenay".
- Adeline de Courtenay married Avalon de Seignelay
- Guillaume de Courtenay married Matilda daughter of Robert FitzEdith and Mathilde d’Avranches.

Renaud and his second wife Hawise d’Avranches had: (Note: K. S. B. Keats-Rohan states Renaud's second marriage was childless.)

- Robert de Courtenay married Matilda FitzUrse
- Egeline de Courtenay married Gilbert Basset

== Sources ==
- Keats-Rohan, K. S. B. (2002). Domesday Descendants. Vol. 2. Boydell Press.
- Sanders, Ivan J. (1960). English Baronies: A Study of their Origin and Descent, 1086–1327. Clarendon Press.
- Siberry, Elizabeth (2021). Tales of the Crusaders – Remembering the Crusades in Britain: Engaging the Crusades. Vol. 6. Routledge.
- Suger (2018). Selected Works of Abbot Suger of Saint Denis. Translated by Cusimano, Richard; Whitmore, Eric. Catholic University of America Press.
- Vincent, Nicholas (1999). "Isabella of Angouleme:John's Jezebel". In Church, S. D. (ed.). King John: New Interpretations. Boydell Press.
