= Peter I of Courtenay =

Founder Capetian House of Courtenay (c.1126–1183)

Peter
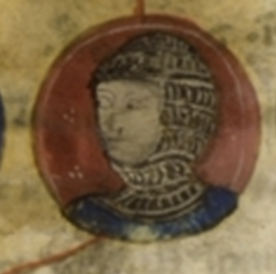
- Peter dressed like a warrior in chain mail, from a medieval illuminated manuscript
- Born: c. 1126; Reims
- Died: 10 April 1183; Acre, Kingdom of Jerusalem
- Burial: Exeter Cathedral
- Spouse: Elizabeth de Courtenay
- Issue: Phillip de Courtenay; Peter II de Courtenay; Alice de Courtenay; Eustachia de Courtenay; Clémence de Courtenay; Robert de Courtenay; William de Courtenay; Isabella de Courtenay; Constance de Courtenay
- House: Courtenay House of Capet (by birth) Capetian House of Courtenay (founder)
- Father: Louis VI of France
- Mother: Adélaide de Maurienne

Peter I of Courtenay (c. 1126 – 10 April 1183) was the sixth son of Louis VI of France and his second wife, Adélaide de Maurienne. He was the father of the Latin Emperor Peter II of Courtenay.

Peter was born in France and died in the Kingdom of Jerusalem. In about 1150, he married Elizabeth de Courtenay (1127 – September 1205), the daughter of Renaud de Courtenay and Hawise du Donjon, thus starting the Capetian line of the House of Courtenay.

== Children ==
Peter I and his wife had ten children:

- Phillip (1153 – before 1186)
- Peter II, Latin Emperor of Constantinople (c. 1155 to 1218)
- Unnamed daughter (c. 1156 – ?)
- Alice (1160 – 12 Feb 1218), married Count Aymer of Angoulême
- Eustachia (1162–1235), married firstly William of Brienne, son of Erard II of Brienne and of Agnès of Montfaucon, secondly William of Champlitte
- Clémence (1164 – ?)
- Robert, Seigneur of Champignelles (1168–1239), married in 1217 Mathilde of Mehun (d. 1240). Their eldest son was Peter of Courtenay, Lord of Conches.
- William, Seigneur of Tanlay (1172 – before 1248)
- Isabella (1169 – after 1194)
- Constance (after 1170–1231)

== Sources ==
- Mosley, Charles (2003). Burke's Peerage, Baronetage & Knightage, 107th edition, 3 volumes. Burke's Peerage. ISBN 0971196621.
- Perry, Guy (2013). John of Brienne: King of Jerusalem, Emperor of Constantinople, c.1175-1237. Cambridge University Press.
- Vincent, Nicholas (1999). "Isabella of Angouleme:John's Jezebel". In Church, S. D. (ed.). King John: New Interpretations. The Boydell Press.
