= Courtenay, Loiret =

Courtenay
- Commune
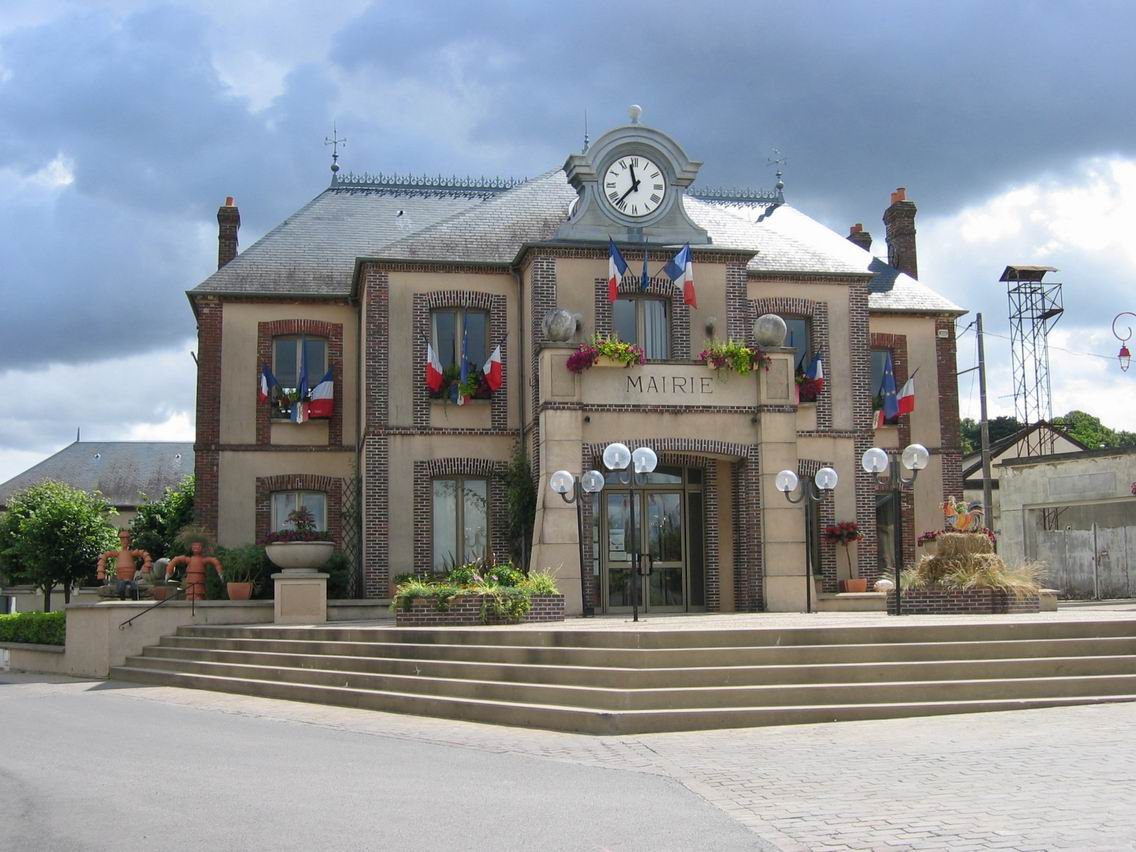
- The town hall in Courtenay

- Coat of arms
- Location of Courtenay
- Location within France Location within Centre-Val de Loire
- Coordinates: 48°02′23″N 3°03′22″E
- Country: France
- Region: Centre-Val de Loire
- Department: Loiret
- Arrondissement: Montargis
- Canton: Courtenay

Government
  - Mayor (2022–2026): Annagaële Maudrux
- Area^{1}: 50.13 km^{2} (19.36 sq mi)
- Highest elevation: 186 m (610 ft)
- Lowest elevation: 137 m (449 ft)
- Population (2023): 3,772
  - Density: 75.24/km^{2} (194.9/sq mi)
- Demonym: Curtinien
- Time zone: UTC+01:00 (CET)
  - Summer (DST): UTC+02:00 (CEST)
- INSEE/Postal code: 45115 /45320
- Website: www.courtenay45.fr
- ^{1} French Land Register data, which excludes lakes, ponds, glaciers > 1 km^{2} (0.386 sq mi or 247 acres) and river estuaries.

Courtenay (French pronunciation: [kuʁtənɛ]) is a commune in the Loiret department in north-central France.

== History ==
Fortified by Athon, the first lord of Courtenay (Seigneur de Courtenay). The Noble house of Courtenay continued in France for many generations and eventually founded the Earls of Devon in England. It is the seat of the canton of Courtenay, which is part of the arrondissement of Montargis.

== Population ==
Historical population
Year	Pop.	±% p.a.
1968	2,333	—
1975	2,554	+1.30%
1982	3,119	+2.90%
1990	3,292	+0.68%
1999	3,437	+0.48%
2007	3,704	+0.94%
2012	4,075	+1.93%
2017	4,018	−0.28%
2023	3,772	−1.05%
Source: INSEE

== Notable people ==
- Courtenay was the birthplace of Aristide Bruant and Pierre Tarin.
- Jacques-René Tenon, the famous surgeon, anatomist and influential 18th century analyst of hospital systems, spent his childhood in Courtenay.

== See also ==
- Communes of the Loiret department
- History of the Loiret
