= Champignelles =

- Commune
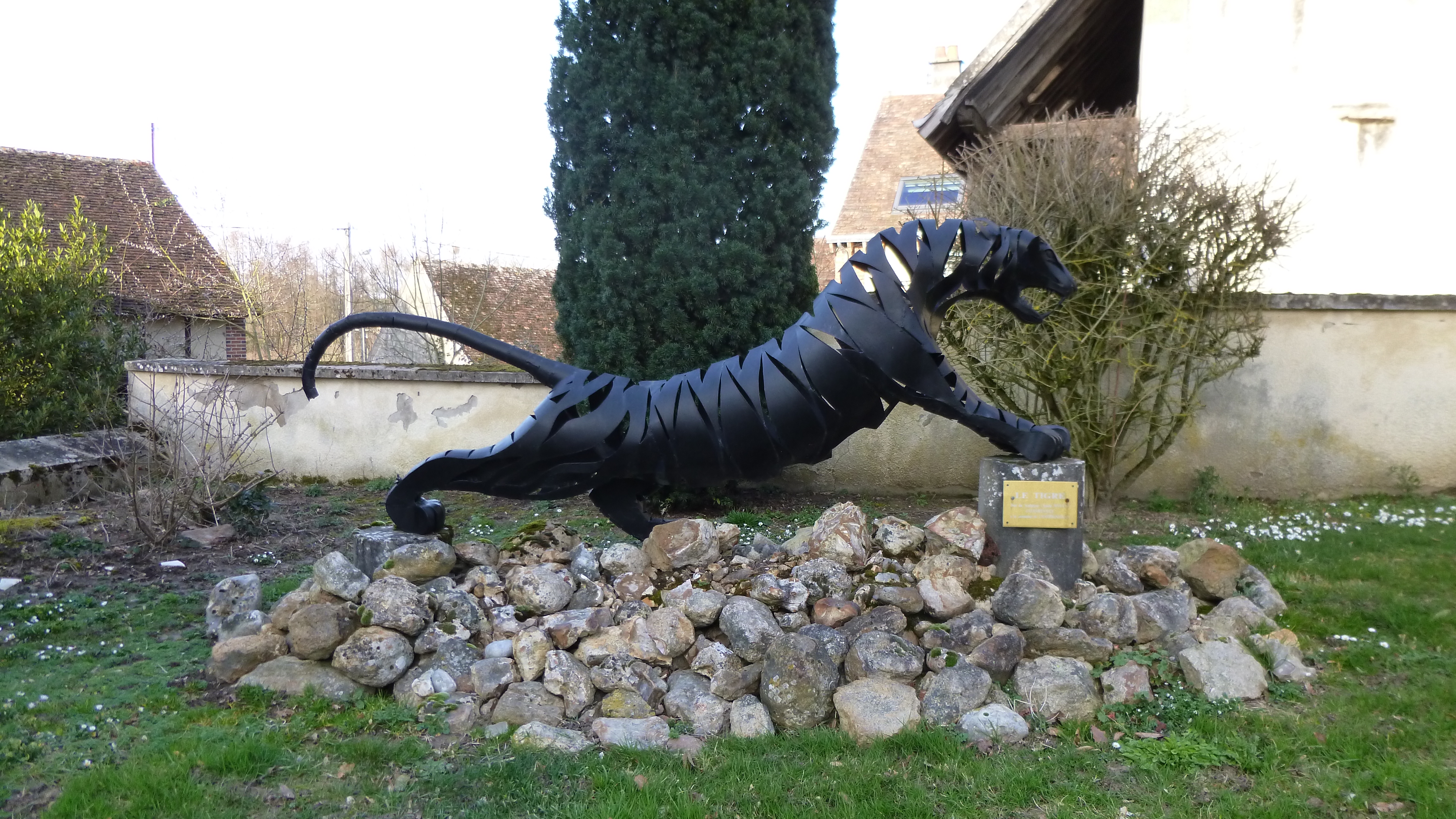
- Le Tigre, by Claude Welsch

- Coat of arms
- Location of Champignelles
- Location within France Location within Bourgogne-Franche-Comté
- Coordinates: 47°46′47″N 3°04′23″E
- Country: France
- Region: Bourgogne-Franche-Comté
- Department: Yonne
- Arrondissement: Auxerre
- Canton: Cœur de Puisaye

Government
  - Mayor (2020–2026): Éric Pauron
- Area^{1}: 53.29 km^{2} (20.58 sq mi)
- Highest elevation: 224 m (735 ft)
- Lowest elevation: 154 m (505 ft)
- Population (2023): 905
  - Density: 17.0/km^{2} (44.0/sq mi)
- Time zone: UTC+01:00 (CET)
  - Summer (DST): UTC+02:00 (CEST)
- INSEE/Postal code: 89073 /89350
- ^{1} French Land Register data, which excludes lakes, ponds, glaciers > 1 km^{2} (0.386 sq mi or 247 acres) and river estuaries.

Champignelles (French pronunciation: [ʃɑ̃piɲɛl]) is a commune in the Yonne department in Bourgogne-Franche-Comté in north-central France.

The commune of Champignelle is situated near the Loiret department, at 50 km from Auxerre and Montargis and 150 km south of Paris. Champignelles was merged with the neighbouring commune of Louesme on 1 January 1973.

== History ==
The castle of the Parc Veil is an evidence of the past families thait reigned over the area until the 19th century.

== Sightseeing ==
=== Le petit train de Champignelles ===
Built on a land of 1.5 ha (3.7 acres) near the Agréau stream, the Little Train of Champignelles is a ridable miniature railway network reproduced on a 1/3 scale. The APTC (Association du Petit Train de Champignelles) was created in 1990 by a group of devoted modellers that worked on a project to rehabilitate an abandoned field in Champignelles, near a place known as Prés de l'Abîme.

Some sixty volunteers participated in the construction, who built the rail network with railway stations, an automated signaling control, turntable, and planted trees to create a nice undergrowth for the train and its association. The track has a 40 cm gauge and has a 1 km network. The BB-001 locomotive runs on a Chrysler thermal engine and can reach 12 km/h. Many events are held on the premises.

=== Saint-Roch church in Louesme ===
The church is devoted to Saint Roch and is in the part of the commune that used to be the Louesme commune, before the municipal merger with Champignelles. It was inscribed as a national monument in 1992. The church was built during the Gothic period, between the 12th and 13th centuries near the creek dedicated to the goddess Loïma from where the name of the village came.

The church was first dedicated to the Virgin Mary, but was later devoted to Saint Roch after the plague of 1710. Many modification were done on the church in the 16th century, with the addition of large windows and a spire, but the building kept is unique nave, which is unaligned with the narthex. The bell tower is from 1600, and the bell, surnamed "Marguerite" and weighing 180 kg, was blessed in 1722. Many ancient mural paintings from the 16th century were discovered and restored at the end of the 20th century.

== See also ==
- Communes of the Yonne department
