= Joscelin I, Lord of Courtenay =

11th century French nobleman

Jocelyn I de Courtenay (c. 1034 – after 1069), son of Athon, was Châtelain de Châteaurenard and Seigneur de Courtenay. Very little is known about his life other than his two marriages. He first married Hildegarde de Château-Landon, daughter of Geoffrey II, Count of Gâtinais, and Ermengarde of Anjou (daughter of Fulk III, Count of Anjou). Joscelin and Hildegarde had one daughter:

- Vaindemonde de Courtenay, married to Renard II, Count of Joigny.

Joscelin married secondly Elizabeth of Montlhéry, daughter of Guy I of Montlhéry and Hodierna of Gometz. Joscelin and Elizabeth had five children:

- Hodierne of Courtenay, married to Geoffroy II, Seigneur of Joinville
- Miles, Seigneur of Courtenay, married Ermengarde of Nevers
- Joscelin I, Count of Edessa and Prince of Galilee
- Geoffroy of Courtney (d. 1139)
- Renaud (d. before 1133), Monk at the monastery of St. John the Evangelist at Sens.

After Joscelin's death, Elizabeth became a nun at St. John's. See also House of Courtenay.

== Sources ==
- Saunier-Seité, Alice, Les Courtenay, Éditions France-Empire, 1998
- Riley-Smith, Johathan, The First Crusaders, 1095-1131, Cambridge University Press, London, 1997
- La Monte, John L., The Lords of Le Puiset on the Crusades, Speculum, 1942
- Jim Bradbury, 'Fulk le Réchin and the Origin of the Plantagenets', Studies in Medieval History Presented to R. Allen Brown, Ed. * Christopher Harper-Bill, Christopher J. Holdsworth, Janet L. Nelson, The Boydell Press, 1989
