= Lord of the Isle of Wight =

- Creation date: 1066
- Created by: William the Conqueror
- First holder: William FitzOsbern, 1st Earl of Hereford
- Last holder: Edward Woodville, Lord Scales
- Extinction date: 1488

The Lord of the Isle of Wight was a feudal title, at times hereditary and at others by royal appointment in the Kingdom of England, before the development of an extensive peerage system.

William the Conqueror granted the lordship of the Isle of Wight to his relative and close counsellor William FitzOsbern, 1st Earl of Hereford in 1066. He died in 1071 and was succeeded by his son Roger de Breteuil, 2nd Earl of Hereford, whose surname was taken from his father's lordship of Breteuil in Normandy. Roger is known to history for his role in the Revolt of the Earls, for which he was deprived of his lands and titles and imprisoned in 1075.

The next creation of the title was by Henry I in 1101 for Richard de Redvers, who had been one of his principal supporters in the struggle against his brother Robert Curthose for control of the English throne. On his death in 1107 he was succeeded by his son Baldwin, who was created Earl of Devon in 1141. The lordship of the Isle of Wight was thereafter held with the earldom by the de Redvers family. The last holder of both titles was Isabella de Fortibus nee de Redvers, 8th Countess of Devon, who inherited them on the death her brother Baldwin in 1262. Widowed the previous year, she became the wealthiest woman in the British Isles who was not a member of a royal family. She lived in Carisbrooke Castle on the island and exercised her rights and privileges as feudal overlord. On her deathbed, she sold the island to Edward I for 6,000 marks.

The Lordship thereafter became a royal appointment. Its holders were usually close confidants of, or closely related to, the monarch. For example, in the fourteenth century Edward II appointed his favourite Piers Gaveston. Edward's son Edward, Earl of Chester, afterwards King Edward III was also appointed as were the latter's grandson Edward of Norwich, 2nd Duke of York. In the fifteenth century Humphrey, Duke of Gloucester "son, brother and uncle of kings" was appointed, as were members of the Beaufort and Woodville families during the Wars of the Roses. The last appointee, Edward Woodville, styled Lord Scales, who had supported Henry VII in that conflict, died in 1488.

== Lords of the Isle of Wight, 1st creation (1066) ==
- William FitzOsbern, 1st Earl of Hereford (died 1071)
- Roger de Breteuil, 2nd Earl of Hereford (1075 seized)

== Lords of the Isle of Wight, 2nd creation (1101) ==
- Richard de Redvers (died 1107)
- Baldwin de Redvers, 1st Earl of Devon (died 1155)
- Richard de Redvers, 2nd Earl of Devon (died 1162)
- Baldwin de Redvers, 3rd Earl of Devon (died 1188)
- Richard de Redvers, 4th Earl of Devon (died c. 1193)
- William de Redvers, 5th Earl of Devon (died 1217)
- Baldwin de Redvers, 6th Earl of Devon (died 1245)
- Baldwin de Redvers, 7th Earl of Devon (died 1262)
- Isabella de Fortibus, 8th Countess of Devon (died 1293)

== Appointed Lords and Ladies of the Isle of Wight ==
- 1307: Piers Gaveston, 1st Earl of Cornwall (killed 1312)
- Edward, Earl of Chester (became King Edward III in 1327)
- 1385: William de Montagu, 2nd Earl of Salisbury (died 1397)
- 4 June 1397: Edward of Norwich, 2nd Duke of York (died 1415 in action)
- 10 December 1415: Philippa de Mohun (died 1431 at Carisbrooke Castle)
- 1415 (presumably in reversion): Humphrey, Duke of Gloucester (died 1447)
- 1452: Edmund Beaufort, 2nd Duke of Somerset (died 1455)
- 1457: Henry Beaufort, 3rd Duke of Somerset (died 1464)
- 1474: Anthony Woodville, 2nd Earl Rivers (died 1483)
- 1485: Edward Woodville, styled Lord Scales (died 1488).

== See also ==
- Henry Beauchamp, 1st Duke of Warwick is said to have been crowned "King of the Isle of Wight" in 1444 by his boyhood friend King Henry VI but never held the lordship.
- Frederick, Prince of Wales, son of George II and father of George III, seems to have been gazetted Marquess of the Isle of Wight in the Peerage of Great Britain in error in 1726; the title as intended (and subsequently referred to) was Marquess of the Isle of Ely

== Notes and references ==
- G. E. C., The Complete Peerage, vol. III (1890) p. 100, note f.
