= List of earls in the reign of Richard I of England =

This is a list of Earls (suo jure or jure uxoris) or Countesses (suo jure) during the reign of Richard I of England who reigned from 1189 to 1199.

The period of tenure as Earl or Countess is given after the name and title of each individual, including any period of minority.

Earl of Arundel

- William d'Aubigny, 2nd Earl of Arundel (1176–1193)
- William d'Aubigny, 3rd Earl of Arundel (1193–1221)

Earl of Chester

- Ranulf de Blondeville, 6th Earl of Chester (1181–1232)

Earl of Derby

- William de Ferrers, 3rd Earl of Derby (1162–1190)
- William de Ferrers, 4th Earl of Derby (1190–1247)

Earl of Devon

- Richard de Redvers, 4th Earl of Devon (1188–1193)
- William de Redvers, 5th Earl of Devon (1193–1217)

Earl of Essex

- William de Mandeville, 3rd Earl of Essex (1166–1189)

Earl of Gloucester

- Isabella, Countess of Gloucester suo jure (1183–1217)
- John of England, Earl of Gloucester jure uxoris (1189–1199)

Earl of Hertford

- Richard de Clare, 3rd Earl of Hertford (1173–1217)

Earl of Huntingdon

- David of Scotland, Earl of Huntingdon (1185–1219)

Earl of Leicester

- Robert de Beaumont, 3rd Earl of Leicester (1168–1190)
- Robert de Beaumont, 4th Earl of Leicester (1191–1204)

Earl of Norfolk

- Roger Bigod, 2nd Earl of Norfolk (1189–1221)

Earl of Northumbria

- Hugh de Puiset, Bishop of Durham, Earl of Northumbria (1189–1190)

Earl of Oxford

- Aubrey de Vere, 1st Earl of Oxford (1141–1194)
- Aubrey de Vere, 2nd Earl of Oxford (1194–1214)

Earl of Pembroke

- Isabel de Clare, 4th Countess of Pembroke suo jure (1185–1199)

Earl of Richmond

- Constance, Duchess of Brittany, Countess of Richmond suo jure (1171–1201)
- Geoffrey II, Duke of Brittany, Earl of Richmond jure uxoris (1181–1186)
- Ranulf de Blondeville, 6th Earl of Chester, Earl of Richmond jure uxoris (1188–1198)

Earl of Salisbury

- William of Salisbury, 2nd Earl of Salisbury (1168–1196)
- Ela of Salisbury, 3rd Countess of Salisbury suo jure (1196–1261)
- William Longespée, 3rd Earl of Salisbury jure uxoris (1196–1226)

Earl of Surrey

- Isabel de Warenne, Countess of Surrey suo jure (1148–1203)
- Hamelin de Warenne, Earl of Surrey jure uxoris (1159–1202)

Earl of Warwick

- Waleran de Beaumont, 4th Earl of Warwick (1184–1203)
