= Isabel Marshal =

- Countess of Hertford; Countess of Cornwall
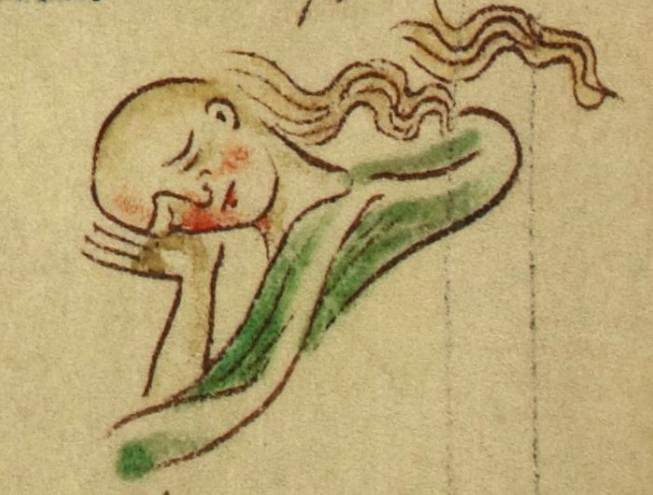
- Born: 9 October 1200; Pembroke Castle, Wales
- Died: 17 January 1240 (aged 39); Berkhamsted Castle, Hertfordshire, England
- Burial: Body: Beaulieu Abbey, Hampshire; Heart: Tewkesbury Abbey, Gloucestershire
- Spouse: Gilbert de Clare, 4th Earl of Hertford (m. 1217–30; his death); Richard, 1st Earl of Cornwall (m. 1231–40, her death)
- Issue: Agnes de Clare; Amice de Redvers, Countess of Devon; Richard de Clare, 5th Earl of Hertford; Isabel de Brus, Lady of Annandale; William de Clare; Gilbert de Clare; Henry of Almain
- House: Marshal
- Father: William Marshal, 1st Earl of Pembroke
- Mother: Isabel de Clare, 3rd Countess of Pembroke

Isabel Marshal (9 October 1200 – 17 January 1240) was a medieval English countess and a member of the Marshal Family. She was the wife of both Gilbert de Clare, 4th Earl of Hertford and 5th Earl of Gloucester and Richard, 1st Earl of Cornwall (son of King John of England). With the former, she was a great-grandmother of King Robert the Bruce of Scotland.

== Family ==
Born on 9 October 1200 at Pembroke Castle, Wales, Isabel was the seventh child, and second daughter, of William Marshal, 1st Earl of Pembroke and Isabel de Clare. She was a member of the Marshal Family. She had 9 siblings: 4 sisters and 5 brothers, who included the 2nd, 3rd, 4th, 5th and 6th Earls of Pembroke; each of her brothers dying without a legitimate male heir, thus passing the title on to the next brother in line. Her last brother to hold the title of Earl of Pembroke died without legitimate issue, and the title was passed down through the family of Isabel's younger sister Joan. Her sisters married, respectively, the Earls of Norfolk, Surrey, and Derby; the Lord of Abergavenny and the Lord of Swanscombe.

== First marriage ==
On her 17th birthday, Isabel was married to Gilbert de Clare, 4th Earl of Hertford and 5th Earl of Gloucester, who was 20 years her senior and her cousin, at Tewkesbury Abbey. The marriage was an extremely happy one, despite the age difference. The couple had five children:

- Amice de Clare (1220–1287), who married the 6th Earl of Devon
- Richard de Clare, 5th Earl of Hertford (1222–1262), who married Maud de Lacy, daughter of John de Lacy, 2nd Earl of Lincoln and Margaret de Quincy, Countess of Lincoln
- Isabel de Clare (2 November 1226 – 10 July 1264), who married the Robert de Brus, 5th Lord of Annandale; through this daughter, Isabel would be the great-grandmother of Robert the Bruce
- William de Clare (1228–1258)
- Gilbert de Clare (b. 1229), a priest

Isabel's husband Gilbert joined an diplomatic mission to Brittany in the fall of 1230 for Henry III of England, but died 25 October 1230 on his way back to Penrose, in that duchy. His body was brought home to Tewkesbury, where he was buried at Tewkesbury Abbey.

== Second marriage ==
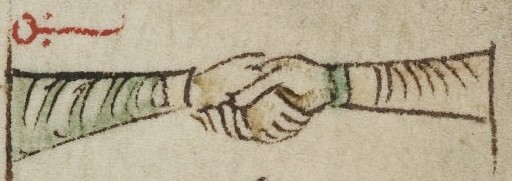
the marriage of Richard of Cornwall to Isabella of Gloucester

Isabel was a young widow, only 30 years old. She had proven childbearing ability and the ability to bear healthy sons; as evidenced by her six young children, three of whom were sons. These were most likely the reasons for both the proposal of marriage from Richard, 1st Earl of Cornwall, and Isabel's acceptance of it, despite the fact that her husband had been dead for only five months. The two were married on 30 March 1231 at Fawley Church, much to the displeasure of Richard's brother King Henry, who had been arranging a more advantageous match for Richard. Isabel and Richard got along well enough, though Richard had a reputation as a womanizer and is known to have had mistresses during the marriage. They were the parents of four children, three of whom died in the cradle.

- John of Cornwall (31 January 1232 – 22 September 1233), born and died at Marlow, Buckinghamshire, buried at Reading Abbey
- Isabella of Cornwall (9 September 1233 – 10 October 1234), born and died at Marlow, Buckinghamshire, buried at Reading Abbey
- Henry of Almain (2 November 1235 – 13 March 1271), murdered by his cousins Guy and Simon de Montfort, buried at Hailes Abbey.
- Nicholas of Cornwall (b. & d. 17 January 1240 Berkhamsted Castle), died shortly after birth, buried at Beaulieu Abbey with his mother

== Death and burial ==
Isabel died of liver failure, contracted while in childbirth, on 17 January 1240, at Berkhamsted Castle. She was 39 years old.

When Isabel was dying she asked to be buried next to her first husband at Tewkesbury Abbey, but Richard had her interred at Beaulieu Abbey, with her infant son, instead. As a pious gesture, however, he sent her heart to Tewkesbury.

== Media ==
- Isabel and her husband Richard appear as characters in Virginia Henley's historical novels, The Marriage Prize and The Dragon and the Jewel.
