= Isabel de Forz, 8th Countess of Devon =

English noblewoman (1237–1293)

- Isabel's paternal arms: Or, a lion rampant azure (Redvers). These arms were later quartered by the Courtenay family, her heirs
- Born: July 1237
- Died: 10 November 1293 (aged 56)
- Spouse: William de Forz, 4th Earl of Albemarle (d. 1260)
- Children: 6, including Aveline
- Parents: Baldwin de Redvers (father); Amice de Clare (mother)
- Relatives: Baldwin de Redvers (brother); Gilbert de Clare (grandfather)

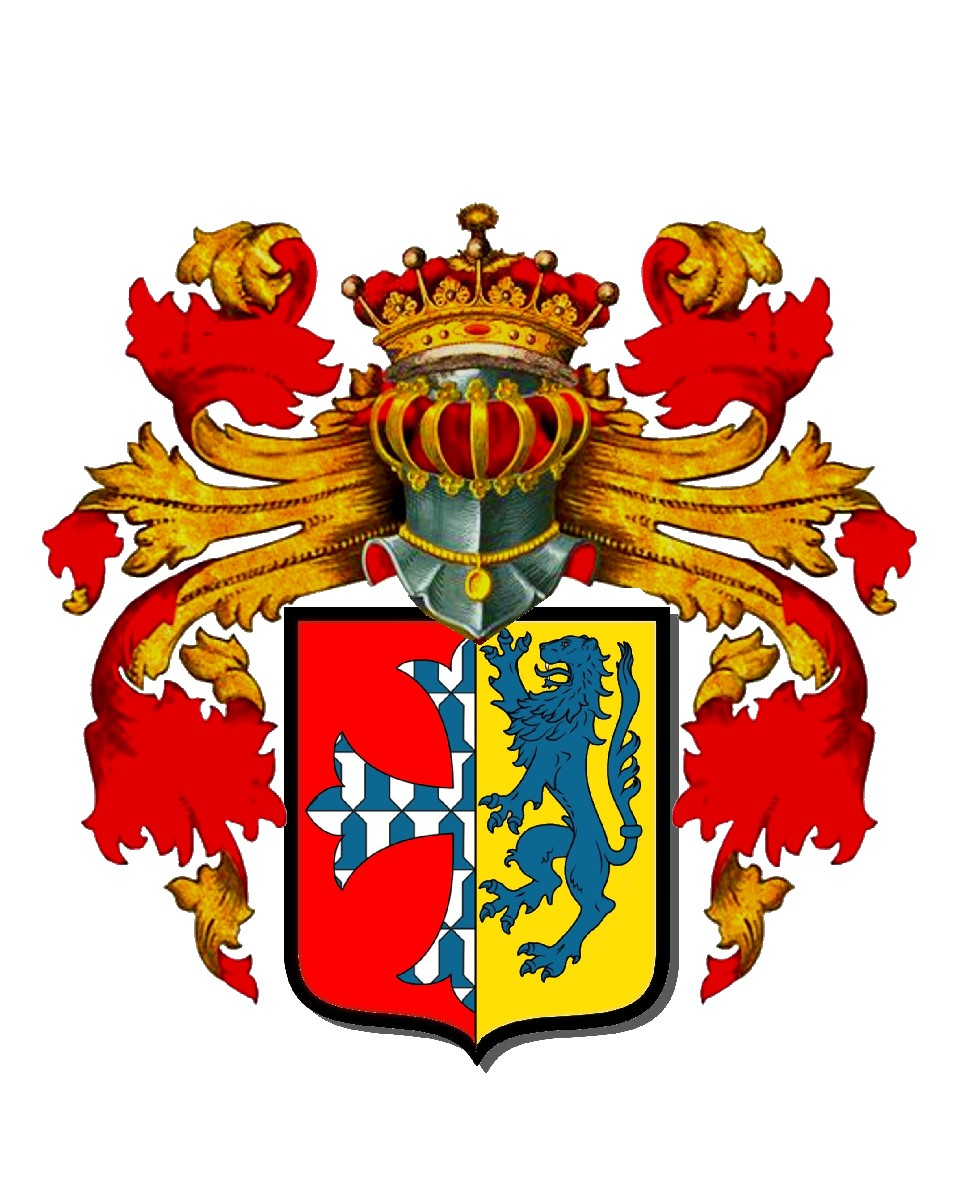

Isabel de Forz (or Isabel de Redvers, Latinized to Isabella de Fortibus; July 1237 – 10 November 1293) was the eldest daughter of Baldwin de Redvers, 6th Earl of Devon (1217–1245). On the death of her brother Baldwin de Redvers, 7th Earl of Devon, in 1262, without children, she inherited suo jure (in her own right) the earldom and also the feudal barony of Plympton in Devon, and the lordship of the Isle of Wight. After the early death of her husband and her brother, before she was thirty years old, she inherited their estates and became one of the richest women in England, living mainly in Carisbrooke Castle on the Isle of Wight, which she held from the king as tenant-in-chief.

She had six children, all of whom died before her. On her death bed, she was persuaded to sell the Isle of Wight to King Edward I, in a transaction that has ever since been considered questionable. Her heir to the feudal barony of Plympton was her cousin Hugh de Courtenay, 1st/9th Earl of Devon (1276–1340), feudal baron of Okehampton, Devon, who in 1335 was declared Earl of Devon.

Countess Wear, now a suburb of Exeter, is named after a weir that she built on the River Exe, and she is the subject of several legends and traditions.

== Origins ==
She was the eldest daughter of Baldwin de Redvers, 6th Earl of Devon (1217–1245), of Tiverton Castle in Devon, by his wife Amice de Clare (c. 1220 – 1284), a daughter of Gilbert de Clare, 4th Earl of Hertford, 5th Earl of Gloucester, 1st Lord of Glamorgan. Her early life was apparently spent at Tidcombe near her father's seat at Tiverton.

== Marriage and issue ==
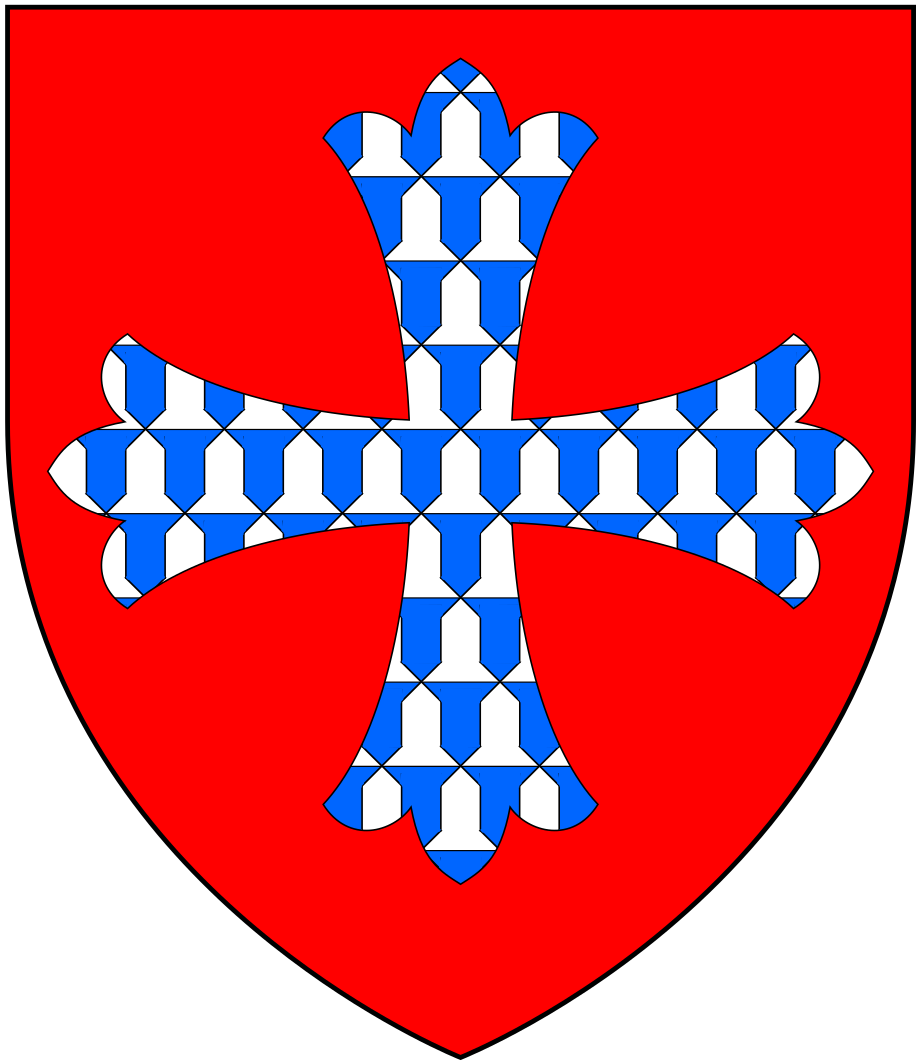
Arms of de Forz: Gules, a cross patonce vair.

At the age of 11 or 12 she became the second wife of William de Forz, 4th Earl of Albemarle (died 1260), who held land in Yorkshire and Cumberland and was Count of Aumale in Normandy. When he died in 1260, their children were minors, so the wardship of his heir (whose name is not known), and his estates passed to the crown, namely King Henry III. One-third of her late husband's estates were granted to Isabel as her dower, comprising one-third of the feudal barony Holderness, half of the feudal barony of Cockermouth, and the feudal barony of Skipton. She was also granted custody of two of her younger sons, Thomas and William. The king granted to his own son and heir apparent, Prince Edward (later King Edward I), the other two-thirds of the estates and the marriage of the heir.

She had six children by William de Forz, four sons and two daughters, who all predeceased her:

- John de Forz, predeceased his father and mother;
- Teron de Forz, predeceased his father and mother;
- Thomas de Forz (died before April 1269), predeceased his mother;
- William de Forz (died before April 1269), predeceased his mother;
- Avice de Forz (died before April 1269), daughter, predeceased her mother;
- Aveline de Forz (1259–1274), who in 1269 married Edmund Crouchback, son of King Henry III, but died childless four years later, aged 15, predeceasing her mother.

Upon her father's death. Marrying William de Forz.

After his death she courted:

- Simon de Montfort. Despite the younger Simon de Montfort (second son of Simon de Montfort, 6th Earl of Leicester) having acquired the very valuable rights to her remarriage in 1264, (female tenants-in-chief or widows of such requiring royal licence to remarry) she refused to marry him and hid away in Breamore Priory in Hampshire and later in Wales.
- Edmund Crouchback, 1st Earl of Lancaster. In 1268 her marriage was granted to Edmund Crouchback, 1st Earl of Lancaster, son of King Henry III, but she refused to marry him either. Instead however, her daughter Aveline de Forz (1258–1273) did marry Edmund in 1269, but died five years later, aged 15.

== Widowhood ==
Two of Isabel's seals

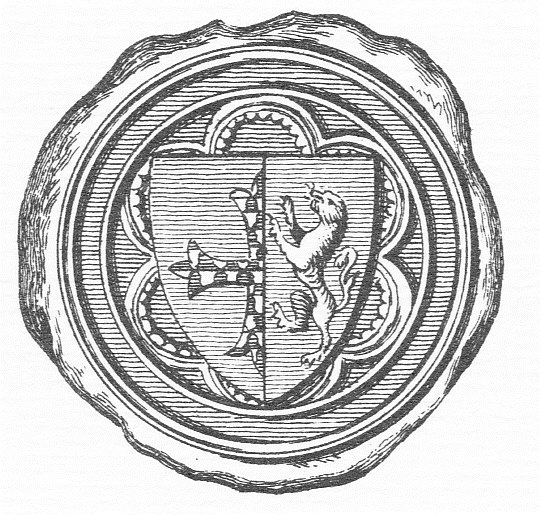
Showing her paternal arms of Redvers (a lion rampant) impaled by the dimidiated arms of her husband, William de Forz (a cross patonce). This seal displays a rare mixture of forms of marshalling.

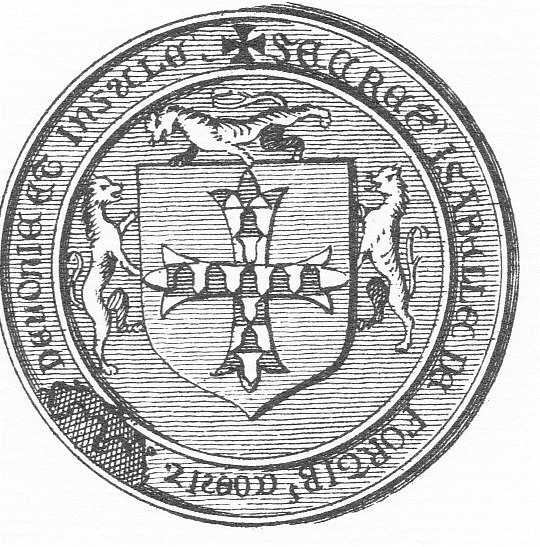
The Redvers lion is repeated as a border around a shield containing the de Forz arms of her husband. Legend: SECRETUM ISABELL(A)E DE FORTIB(U)S (COMITISSA(E)) DEVONI(A)E ET INSUL(A)E ("Personal seal of Isabel de Forz, Countess of Devon and of the Isle")

After the death of her husband in 1260, Isabel lived with her children and her mother, Amice de Clare, at Burstwick in her barony of Holderness. Isabel and Amice jointly purchased the outstanding two-thirds of the feudal barony of Holderness that Isabel did not already hold, and they administered the area jointly for some years.

=== Inheriting the Earldom of Devon ===
In 1262 Isabel's brother Baldwin de Redvers, 7th Earl of Devon died and, subject to his widow's and his mother's dower rights, she inherited his lands in Devon, Hampshire, the Isle of Wight and Harewood in Yorkshire. From then on she lived mainly at Carisbrooke Castle on the Isle of Wight. She used titles including "Countess of Aumale and of Devon" and "Lady of the Isle", and in her surviving charters she is regularly referred to in the Latinized form Isabella de Fortibus. (Note: Her husband used both "Forz" and the Latinized form "Fortibus" as his surname.)

In her mid-twenties, widowed for two years, then left with a rich dower, she was one of the richest heiresses in England, and a much-sought-after wife for several powerful and ambitious men. In 1264 Simon de Montfort (second son of Simon de Montfort, 6th Earl of Leicester) acquired the very valuable rights to her remarriage, having obtained the royal licence requisite for the remarriage of a female tenant-in-chief. However, she refused to marry him and hid from him, at first in Breamore Priory in Hampshire, and later in Wales. Four years later, in November 1268, her marriage was granted to Edmund Crouchback, son of King Henry III, but having refused him also. He married her daughter Aveline de Forz (1259–1274) in 1269, but she died childless four years later, aged 15.

Many of Isabel's estate accounts from her long period of widowhood have survived and have been subjected to much study. Her net income in the 1260s is known to have risen by 2/3rds, from £1,500 to £2,500 (now equivalent to equivalent to £3,163,086 in 2023).

From about 1274 her estates were being managed by Adam de Stratton, a notorious money-lender, in association with the Tuscan bankers the Riccardi family of Lucca. In 1276 she gave her office of Chamberlain of the Exchequer to Stratton, probably as a reward for his financial services, and he continued as her chief financial official until at least 1286. She apparently owned her own copy of the Statutes of the Realm and being very litigious, with her advisers she prosecuted in the law courts dozens of cases, both civil and criminal.

=== Selling the Isle of Wight ===
It is known that King Edward I (1272–1307) had long wanted to acquire Isabel's estates. In 1276 he proposed that she should sell him the lands in southern England which she had inherited from her brother, but the conveyance was not completed. Following the death in 1274 of her daughter and last surviving heir apparent, Aveline, a certain John de Eston was found (against expectations) by a jury at her inquisition post mortem to be Isabel's next heir. In 1278 this John de Eston quit-claimed to the Crown her lands in the north and in the County of Aumale and its associated lands.

In 1293 King Edward I re-opened negotiations to acquire Isabel's southern lands, and while travelling from Canterbury in Kent, Isabel was taken ill and stopped near Lambeth in Surrey, opposite the Palace of Westminster. One of Edward's favourite servants, Walter Langton, who was a clerk in chancery, rushed to her and drafted a charter to confirm the sale of the Isle of Wight to the king. It was read to the dying Isabel, who ordered her Lady of the Bedchamber to seal it on her behalf. She died at nearby Stockwell in the early morning of 10 November 1293, aged 56, and was buried at Breamore Priory in Hampshire.

== Succession ==
After Isabel's death, the feudal barony of Plympton and eventually the Earldom of Devon passed to her 17-year-old second cousin once removed (Both shared common ancestry from William de Redvers, 5th Earl of Devon (died 1217), Isabel's great-grandfather and Courtenay's great-great-grandfather) Hugh de Courtenay, 9th Earl of Devon (1276–1340), feudal baron of Okehampton, Devon, who in 1335 was declared Earl of Devon. In 1315 he petitioned Parliament, unsuccessfully, claiming his right as Isabel's heir, to the Lordship of the Isle of Wight and to the adjacent manor of Christchurch, part of the Feudal barony of Plympton.

== Countess Wear, Exeter ==
Countess Wear, now a suburb of Exeter, takes its name from a fish weir on the River Exe, about two miles downstream of the ancient walled city, which Isabel de Forz is said to have built in the late 13th century. The details of the weir's construction are uncertain: a source of 1290 states that Isabel had it built in 1284 and thereby damaged the salmon fishing and prevented boats from reaching Exeter, but a later source of 1378 claims that she had had the weir built in 1272, leaving a thirty-foot gap in the centre through which boats could pass, until it was blocked between 1307 and 1327 by her cousin Hugh de Courtenay, 9th Earl of Devon.

== Legends and traditions ==
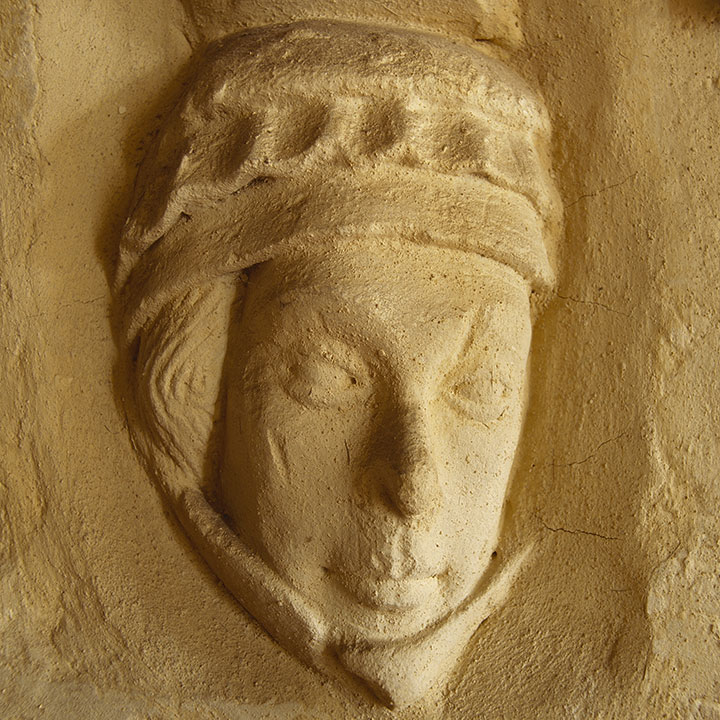
Sculpted corbel in Christchurch Priory, Dorset, possibly a portrait of Isabel

Two legends exist which feature Isabel de Forz. One, that of the Seven Crosses, of which there are many variations, relates that she came across a poor man carrying a basket containing what he said were puppies, but which were in fact seven of his children whom he was going to drown because he could not afford to keep them. After severely upbraiding him for his lack of morality, Isabel adopted the children and ensured that they were looked after and well-educated until their adulthood when she found employment for all of them.

The other legend concerns the disputed boundary of four parishes in East Devon which she, as Countess, was called upon to settle. She is said to have done this by arranging to meet the disputants on top of a marshy hill near the site whereupon she took off a ring from her finger and threw it into the middle of the bog declaring "that shall be the boundary". The place where these four parishes meet is called "Ring in the Mire".

Isabel is also said to have given in perpetuity a water supply to the inhabitants of Tiverton, Devon. A ceremony to commemorate the gift, known as the Perambulation of the Town Leat still takes place in the town every seven years. (Note: Some sources state that it was Isabel's mother, Amicia, who ordered the leat to be built and presented it to the town.) There was also a tradition that she was responsible for the planting of Wistman's Wood, a stand of ancient stunted oak trees high on Dartmoor.

== Sources ==
- Sanders, I.J. English Baronies: A Study of their Origin and Descent 1086–1327, Oxford, 1960.

Peerage of England
Preceded by Baldwin de Redvers	Countess of Devon; 1262–1293	Dormant Title next held by Hugh Courtenay
