= Baldwin de Redvers (died 1216) =

Baldwin de Redvers (after 28 April 1200 – 1 September 1216) was the son of William de Redvers, 5th Earl of Devon and Mabile de Beaumont, daughter of Robert de Beaumont, Count of Meulan. He was married to Margaret Fitz Gerold, daughter of Warin FitzGerold and had one child, his son, Baldwin de Redvers, 6th Earl of Devon.
