= Countess of Devon =

English noble title

- Incumbent; Allison Joy Courtenay since 18 August 2015
- Style: The Right Honourable
- Member of: Peerage of England
- Seat: Powderham Castle
- Term length: As long as married to the Earl of Devon
- Formation: 1141 (first creation); 1553 (fifth and present creation)
- First holder: Adelize de Baalun

Countess of Devon is a title that may be held by a woman in her own right or used by the wife of the Earl of Devon. Women who have held the title include:

== Countesses in their own right ==
- Isabel de Forz, suo jure 8th Countess of Devon (1237–1293)

== Countesses by marriage ==
- Adelize de Baalun (d. c. 1146)
- Amice de Clare (c. 1220–1284)
- Margaret de Bohun (1311–1391)
- Margaret Beaufort (c. 1409–1449)
- Catherine of York (1479–1527)
- Allison Joy Langer (born 1974)
