= Richard de Redvers (died 1107) =

English noble (c. 1066–1107)

- Baron de Varenguebec, seigneur de Reviers
- Predecessor: Guillaume de Vernon
- Successor: Baldwin de Revier
- Born: 1066; Vernon, Eure, Normandy, France
- Died: 8 September 1107 (aged 68-69); Mosterton, Dorset, England
- Buried: Abbaye de Montebourg
- Spouse: Adelina Peverel
- Issue: Baldwin, William, Robert, Hugh, Hawise
- Father: Guillaume de Vernon
- Mother: Emma FitzOsbern

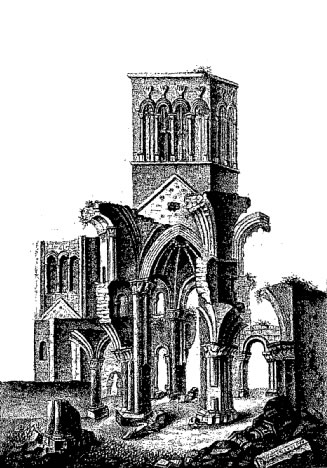
A 19th-century print of the ruins of Montebourg Abbey in Normandy where Richard de Redvers was buried in 1107

Richard de Vernon seigneur de Redvers (or Reviers, Rivers, or Latinised to de Ripariis ("from the river-banks")) (fl. c. 1066 – 8 September 1107), 1st feudal baron of Plympton in Devon, was a Norman nobleman who may have been one of the companions of William the Conqueror during the Norman conquest of England from 1066. His origins are obscure, but after acting as one of the principal supporters of Henry I in his struggle against his brother Robert Curthose for control of the English throne, de Redvers was rewarded with estates that made him one of the richest magnates in the country. He was once thought to have been created the first Earl of Devon, but this theory is now discounted in favour of his son Baldwin.

== Life to 1100 ==
Little is known for certain of the Redvers family before Richard. In his Baronage of England (1675–6), William Dugdale wrongly identified Richard de Redvers with Richard the son of Baldwin FitzGilbert (also known as Baldwin de Meules) who was sheriff of Devon under William the Conqueror. This error was still being repeated in the late 19th century. In around 1890 The Complete Peerage advanced the alternative theory that Richard de Redvers was the son of William de Vernon, but later research has cast doubt on this too, suggesting that all that can be said is that his father may have been Baldwin, one of three brothers named Redvers in Normandy in 1060; the other brothers being William, and Richard, who died in that year. Similarly nothing is known of Richard's early life. The Norman poet Wace, writing c. 1170, mentions a "sire de Reviers" as one of those who accompanied William the Conqueror at the Battle of Hastings, but it is not known if this was Richard de Reviers.

The first clear references to Richard start to appear in the mid-1080s. In the Domesday Book (1086) he is recorded as holding one manor, that of Mosterton in Dorset which he may have been given for serving in William the Conqueror's army of 1066. Mortestorne (as Mosterton was then known) was held by Almer before 1066. It had arable land, a mill, 30 acres of meadow and a large area of woodland and was valued at £12.

According to Wace, in 1089 de Redvers was in the service of Robert Curthose, but was allowed to join his younger brother Henry's retinue at Henry's request. William the Conqueror had bequeathed Normandy to his eldest son Robert, but Henry had bought parts of it from him—including the Cotentin where Néhou, the de Redvers principal possession, was located. Since de Redvers also owned land in the Vexin which was retained by Robert, he had two lords, and evidently chose to support the one under whom his main property lay. From 1090 when Henry fell out with both his older brothers, Richard de Redvers was unswerving in his support of Henry, so much so that he was mentioned by both Orderic Vitalis and William of Jumièges in their chronicles.

Richard's manor at Mosterton does not appear in the Redvers family records after about 1090 and it may therefore have been forfeited due to his support of Henry against William Rufus. The manor passed to the Blount family which held it until the end of the 14th century.

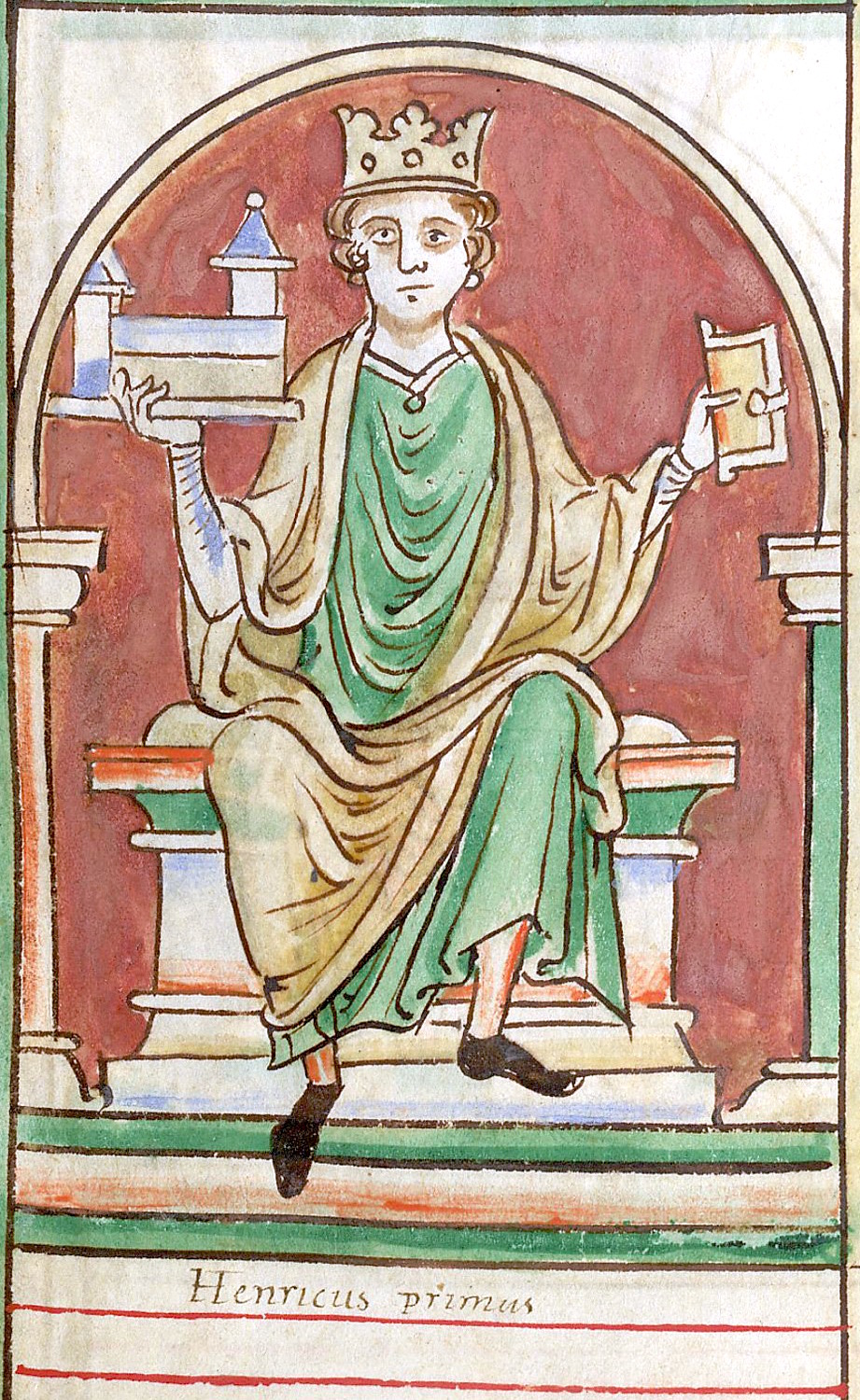
Henry I who rewarded Richard de Redvers for his support with the grant of extensive estates

== Under Henry I ==
When William Rufus died suddenly in 1100 and Henry became king, Richard de Redvers quickly became one of his most trusted advisers. He witnessed more than 20 of Henry's charters and royal writs, in several different places, and sometimes as the only witness. After Richard's death his loyalty was remarked upon by Anselm of Canterbury.

His continued allegiance resulted in Henry awarding him several large grants of land, most importantly the large Honour of Plympton (or feudal barony of Plympton) in Devon (part of which was the so-called Honour of Christchurch in Hampshire (now in Dorset), which was not technically a barony) and also the Lordship of the Isle of Wight with caput at Carisbrooke Castle. In addition to these he still held his estates in Normandy in the Cotentin (at Néhou) and Vexin (at Vernon) and he had also acquired the manors of Crowell in Oxfordshire and Woolley in Berkshire on his marriage.

After the grants from the king, Richard's Devon estates probably consisted of around 180 Domesday manors, including Tiverton and Honiton, as well as the boroughs of Exeter and Plympton. The honour of Christchurch consisted of many widely scattered manors in several counties. He held virtually all of the Isle of Wight (the exceptions being two manors held by the bishop of Winchester), and the island remained in his family until 1293 when King Edward I bought it (together with other manors including Vauxhall, South Lambeth, in Surrey), from Isabel de Forz, 8th Countess of Devon (1237–1293), sister and heiress of Baldwin de Redvers, 7th Earl of Devon (1236–1262), shortly before her death.

According to Robert Bearman, Richard de Redvers can confidently be rated among the twelve wealthiest barons of the time, with estates worth well over £750. It is notable, however, that less than one third of the value of the estates that the king bestowed on him were from ancient demesne (and hence deprived the king of income); the majority were from escheats, including the Isle of Wight which the king had confiscated after Roger de Breteuil's failed Revolt of the Earls in 1075. It was probably in the king's interest to have the Isle of Wight under control of someone trustworthy as it was a prime target for further attack from abroad.

== Contested title ==
Some early documents suggest that Richard de Redvers was created the first Earl of Devon by Henry I. These documents include (1), the Chronicles of Ford Abbey, which have been shown to be unreliable in several matters relating to the de Redvers family; (2), the Cartulary of Twynham, which apparently follows (3), the rubric appended by a later scribe to a charter issued by Richard himself; and (4), a copy of a charter issued by Richard's wife after his death, in which it is assumed that the transcriber has added the word "comitis" ("earl"); significantly the original charter is lost.

Set against these few documents is the abundant charter evidence that Richard never styled himself earl, nor did any of his children or grandchildren call him such, and neither did his wife after his death call herself Countess. Despite this, for many years the discrepancies caused disagreement over the numbering of the Devon earls. However, since the early 20th century the matter appears to be settled, and it is now accepted that the first Earl of Devon was Richard's son, Baldwin.

== Marriage, children and death ==
Richard may have had a brother named Hugh. Some time after 1086, possibly around 1094, he married Adelina (or Adeliz), a daughter of William Peverel of Nottingham and his wife Adeline de Lancastre dame de Loders et d'Ouvelay. They had five children:

1. Baldwin de Redvers (d.1155), created first Earl of Devon by Matilda during the Anarchy
2. William de Vernon, married Lucy de Tancarville, daughter of William de Tancarville and his wife Matilda d'Arques. He inherited Richard's lands in Normandy.
3. Robert de Ste. Mère-Eglise
4. Hubert de Vernon
5. Hadewise de Redvers, married William de Roumare, Earl of Lincoln, c. 1127

Richard de Redvers died on 8 September 1107 and was buried in the Abbey of Montebourg in Normandy, of which he was deemed the founder. It has been said that the top of his stone coffin with the word "Fundator" (founder) carved on it was found and preserved by a M. de Gerville. Richard's wife, Adeliz, lived on until c. 1160.

== Sources ==
- Bearman, Robert (1994). Charters of the Redvers Family and the Earldom of Devon 1090–1217. Exeter: Devon and Cornwall Record Society. ISBN 978-0-901853-37-0.
- Cokayne, George Edward (1916). Gibbs, Vicary (ed.). The Complete Peerage of England, Scotland, Ireland, Great Britain, and the United Kingdom Extant, Extinct, or Dormant. Vol. IV (New ed.). London: The St Catherine Press.
