= William Courtenay, 2nd Viscount Courtenay =

English peer

The Right Honourable The Viscount Courtenay
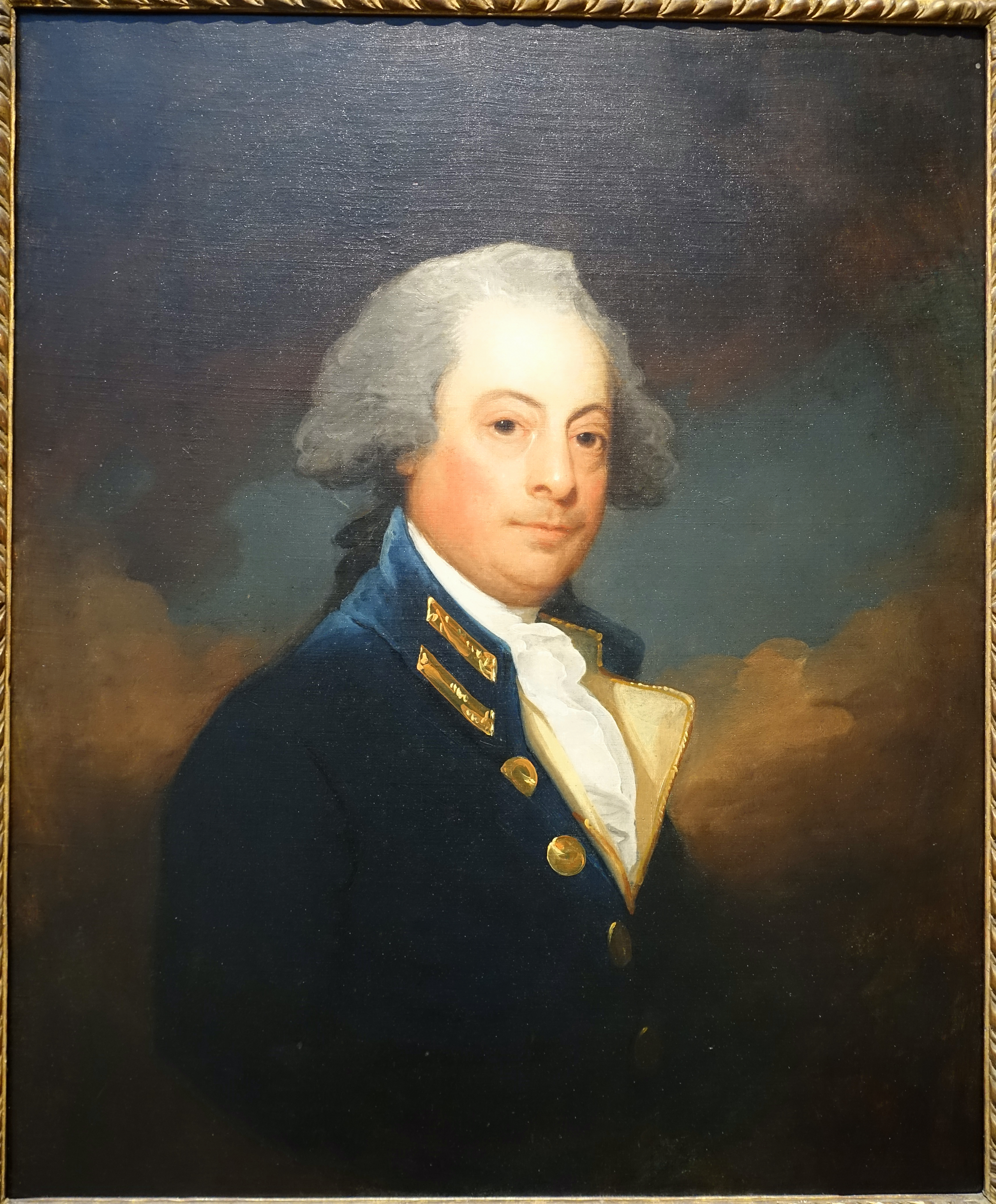
- William, the Second Viscount Courtenay, by Gilbert Stuart
- Born: 30 October 1742
- Died: 14 October 1788 (aged 45)
- Spouse: Frances Clark (m. 1762; died 1782)
- Children: 13, including William
- Father: William Courtenay
- Relatives: Heneage Finch (grandfather); William Courtenay (grandfather)

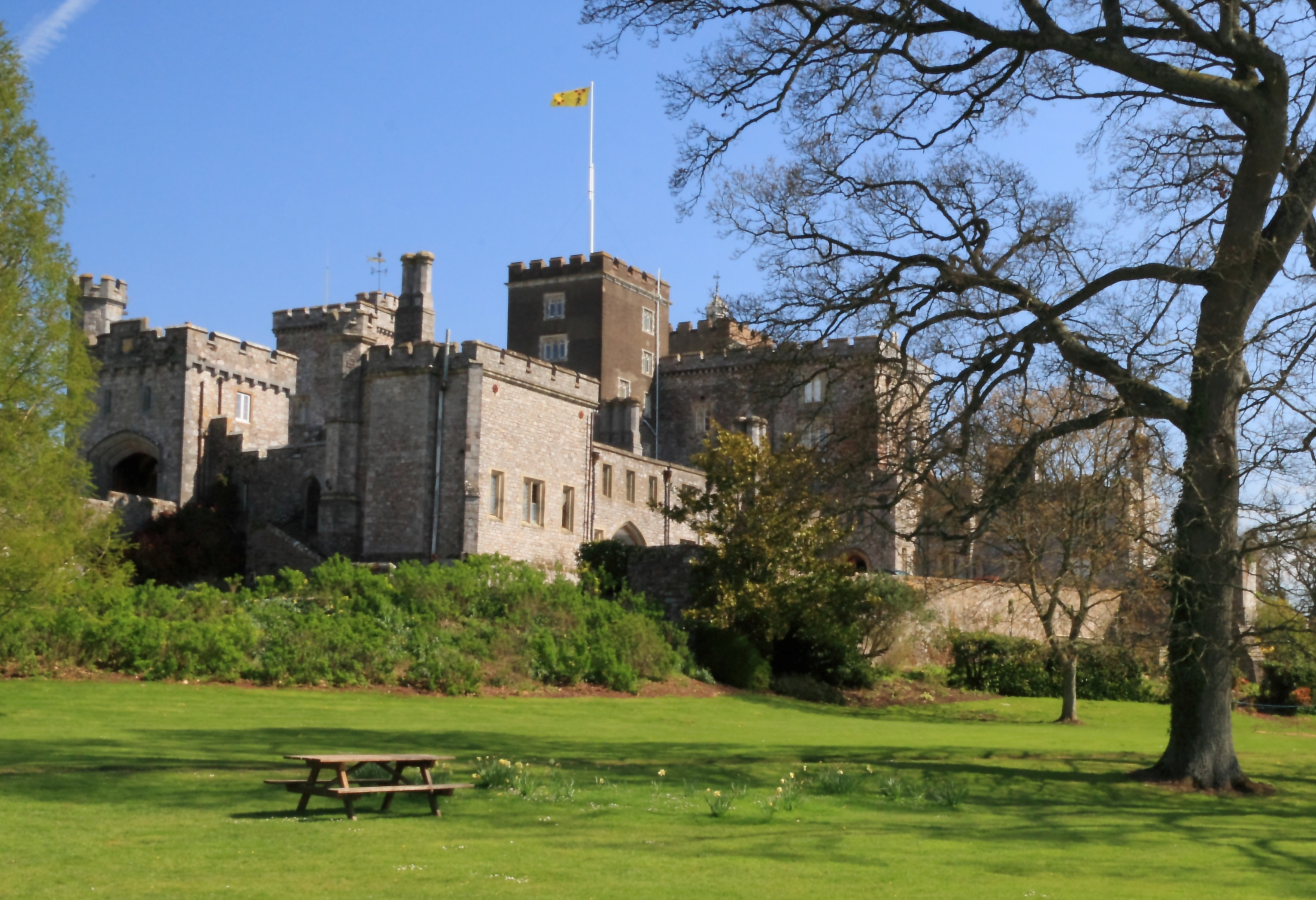
Powderham Castle, the Courtenay family seat

William Courtenay, 2nd Viscount Courtenay (30 October 1742 – 14 October 1788) was an English peer who was the eldest son of William Courtenay, 1st Viscount Courtenay and Lady Frances Finch.

He succeeded to the title of 4th Baronet Courtenay, 2nd Viscount Courtenay of Powderham Castle and 8th Earl of Devon (Created c.1553) on 16 May 1762 upon the death of his father. He was introduced to the House of Lords in January 1765.

== Family ==
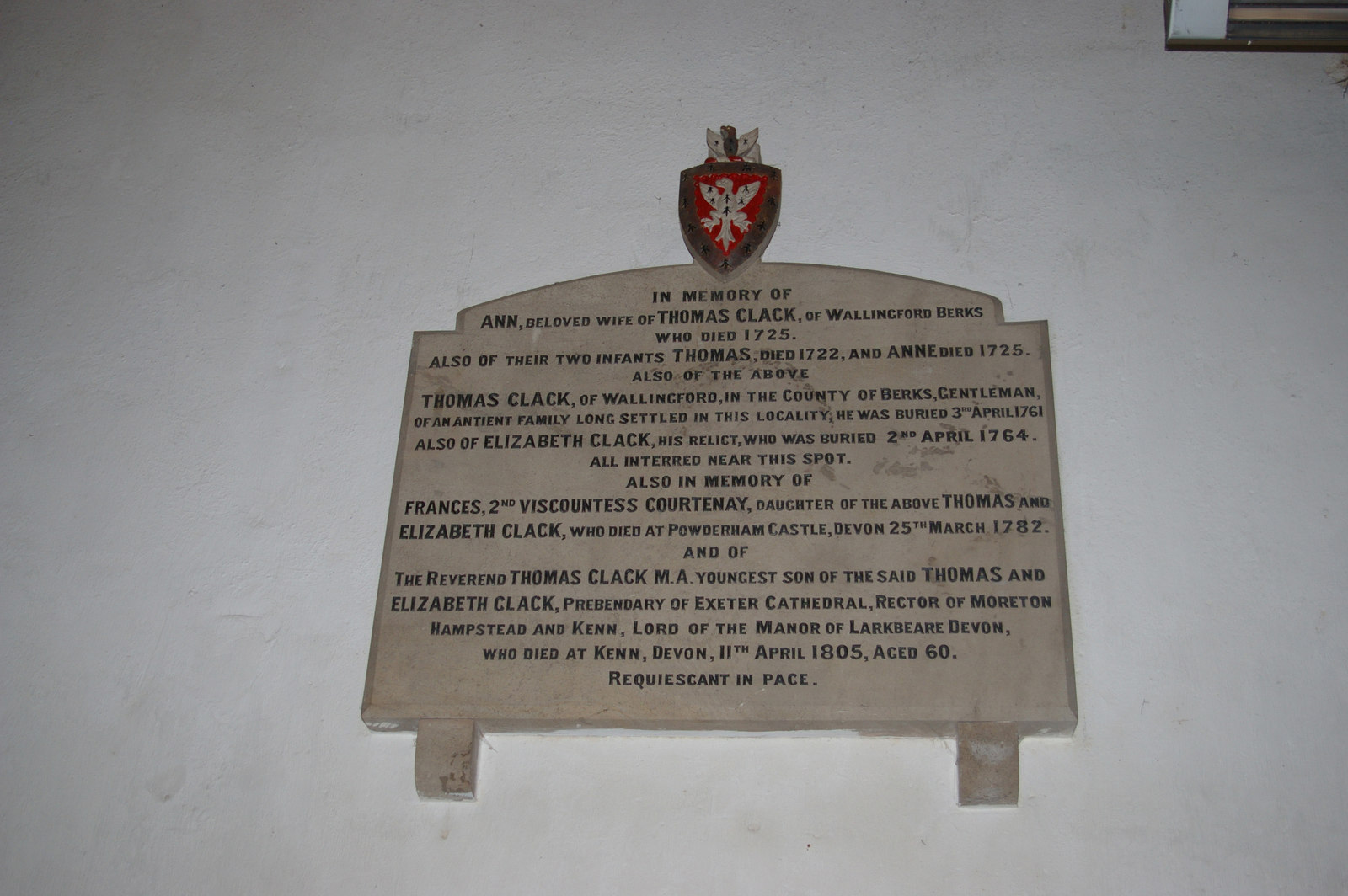
His wife Frances is included in the Clack family memorial in Crowmarsh Gifford

He married Frances Clack (1740 – 25 March 1782), daughter of Thomas Clack of Wallingford, Berkshire, on 7 May 1762 and with whom he had one son and twelve daughters, two of whom died young:

1. Frances Courtenay (13 January 1763 – 9 June 1835) married Sir John Honywood, 4th Baronet, and had five children.
2. Charlotte Courtenay (14 February 1764 – 13 April 1844) married Thomas Giffard, and had three children.
3. Isabella Courtenay (20 June 1765 – 5 March 1783) died aged 17 when her clothes caught fire
4. Elizabeth Courtenay (2 September 1766 – 11 September 1815) married Lord Charles Henry Somerset, and had five children.
5. William Courtenay, 9th Earl of Devon (30 July 1768 – 26 May 1835)
6. Lucy Courtenay (13 June 1770 – 27 January 1822) married John Vaughan, 3rd Earl of Lisburne, and had six children.
7. Harriet Courtenay (7 September 1771 – 14 April 1826) married George Thynne, 2nd Baron Carteret.
8. Anne Courtenay (2 July 1774 – 6 January 1835) married George Annesley, 2nd Earl of Mountnorris, and had two children.
9. Caroline-Eustatia Courtenay (26 March 1775 – 6 March 1851) married Colonel Charles Morland, and had two children.
10. Amelia Courtenay (5 June 1777 – 18 March 1789), died aged 11.
11. Matilda-Jane Courtenay (6 July 1778 – 4 August 1848) married John Lock, and had two children.
12. Sophia Courtenay (25 January 1780 – 11 January 1845) married Lieutenant-Colonel Nathaniel Foy.
13. Louisa Augusta Courtenay (25 December 1781 – 8 February 1825) married Lord Edward Somerset on 17 October 1805, and had three children.

And one illegitimate child. The mother of this child is unknown, all that is known is the child had the surname "Vane" and she was "akin" to Sir Henry Vane the Younger who died of beheading in 1662 over one hundred years earlier.

1. Mary Ann Vane (26 February 1784 – c. 1848–1852) married Louis Chevalier, Seigneur du Saint-Paul of Quebec in approximately 1799. They had three children, Mary Sophia Chevalier, Philip David Chevalier and Mary Anne Chevalier.

Peerage of England
Preceded by William Courtenay	Earl of Devon de jure 1762–1788	Succeeded by William Courtenay
Preceded by William Courtenay	Viscount Courtenay of Powderham; 1762–1788	Succeeded by William Courtenay
