= Baldwin de Redvers, 7th Earl of Devon =

British peer

- Arms of de Redvers: Or, a lion rampant azure
- Born: 1 January 1236
- Died: 1262 (aged 25–26); France
- Spouse: Margaret (m. 1257)
- Children: 1
- Parents: Baldwin de Redvers (father); Amice de Clare (mother)
- Relatives: Isabella de Fortibus (sister)

Baldwin de Redvers, 7th Earl of Devon (1 January 1236 – 1262), feudal baron of Plympton in Devon and Lord of the Isle of Wight, was the son of Baldwin de Redvers, 6th Earl of Devon and Amice de Clare, daughter of Gilbert de Clare, 5th Earl of Hertford. He succeeded his father at the age of ten.

He died in the expedition of Henry III of England to France in 1262; the record of his death by the royal clerks was made on 13 September. He was succeeded by his sister, Isabella de Fortibus, widow of William de Forz, 4th Earl of Albemarle.

== Marriage ==
He married, shortly after his coming of age, in 1257, Margaret, daughter of Thomas II of Savoy, Count of Flanders. They had one child:

- John de Redvers, who died an infant.

== Notes ==
Peerage of England
Preceded by Baldwin de Redvers	Earl of Devon; 1245–1262	Succeeded by Isabella de Forz
