= Richard de Redvers, 2nd Earl of Devon =

English noble

Richard de Redvers, 2nd Earl of Devon (died 1162) was Earl of Devon from 1155 until his death and was feudal baron of Plympton in Devon. He married Denise, one of the daughters and coheiresses of Reginald, Earl of Cornwall. He was High Sheriff of Devon from 1154 to 1157. He was the son of Baldwin de Redvers, 1st Earl of Devon and brother of William de Reviers, 5th Earl of Devon.

He was succeeded by his son Baldwin de Redvers, 3rd Earl of Devon (died 1188).

== Footnotes ==
Peerage of England
Preceded by Baldwin de Redvers	Earl of Devon; 1155–1162	Succeeded by Baldwin de Redvers
