= William Courtenay, 9th Earl of Devon =

English peer

The Right Honourable The Earl of Devon
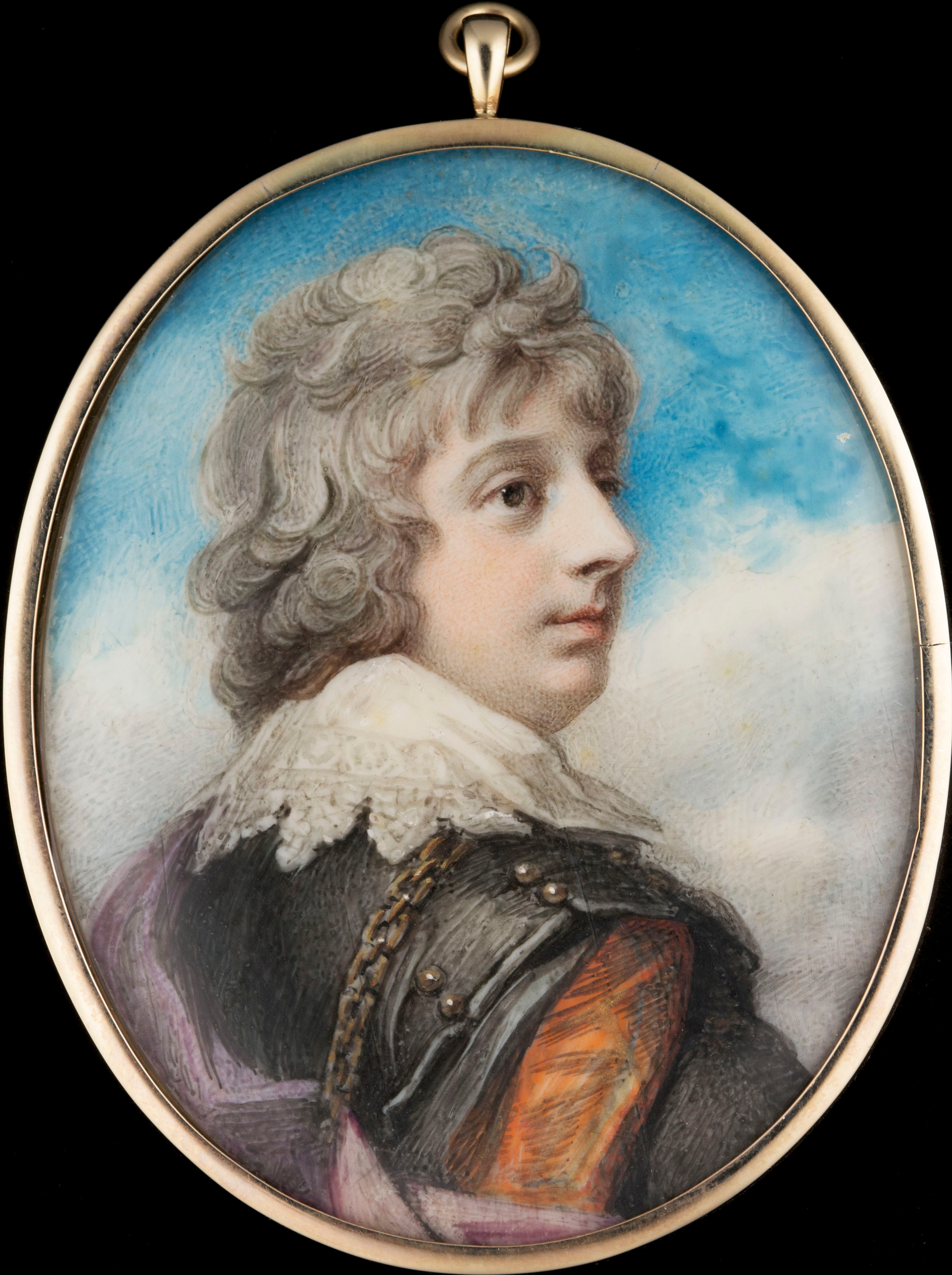
- William Courtenay, 3rd Viscount Courtenay (c. 1768–1835), later 9th Earl of Devon, painted in 1793 aged 25. Miniature by Richard Cosway
- Born: July 30, 1768
- Died: 26 May 1835 (aged 66)
- Partner: William Beckford
- Father: William Courtenay
- Relatives: William Courtenay (grandfather); Alexander Wedderburn (uncle)

Arms of William Courtenay, 9th Earl of Devon (1475–1511): Arms: Quarterly, 1st and 4th, or three torteaux (for Courtenay); 2nd and 3rd, or a lion rampant azure (for Redvers)

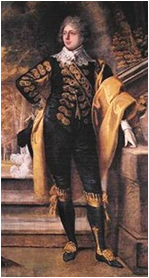
William Courtenay, 3rd Viscount Courtenay (1768-1835), in the masquerade dress he wore aged 21 at his coming-of-age ball at Powderham Castle in 1789, for which event he built the Music Room at Powderham Castle. Detail from portrait by Richard Cosway (1742-1821), collection of Earl of Devon, Powderham Castle, hanging over chimneypiece in Music Room

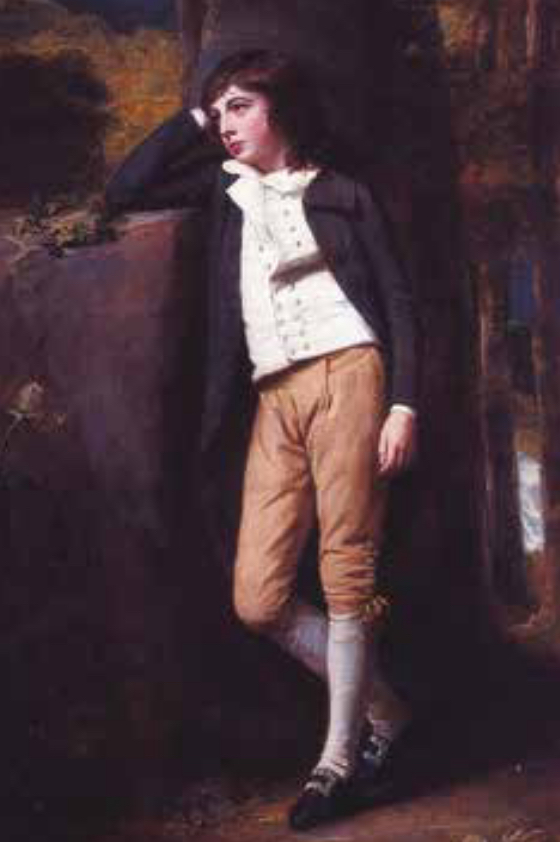
William "Kitty" Courtenay, 9th Earl of Devon, in boyhood.

William Courtenay, 9th Earl of Devon (30 July 1768 – 26 May 1835), styled Viscount Courtenay of Powderham from 1788 to 1831, was an English peer. The only son of William Courtenay, 2nd Viscount Courtenay and his wife Frances Clack, he became involved in a scandal after engaging in an affair with art collector William Thomas Beckford from boyhood until when it was discovered and publicised by his uncle.

== Family ==
Courtenay was baptized on 30 August 1768, the fifth of 14 children (his siblings all being girls) and was known as "Kitty" to family and friends. On his father's death, he became the 3rd Viscount Courtenay of Powderham. With his new title and wealth, the young Lord Courtenay led an excessively flamboyant lifestyle. He was responsible for the addition of a new Music Room at Powderham Castle, designed by James Wyatt, which included a carpet made by the newly formed Axminster Carpet Company.

== Homosexuality ==
Courtenay was in his time considered a notorious homosexual. His near neighbour and contemporary Rev. John Swete (1752–1821) of Oxton House, Kenton in Devon, wrote of him in veiled terms as follows in connection with a discussion of the Parsonage House of the parish of Powderham:

"Unconnected with the Lord of the Castle, to me its contiguity would be considered as a drawback of no little weight; I speak as a clergyman who would be solicitous for the welfare of his flock, and who is fully satisfied that his most earnest exhortations to the poor dependants, to be zealous after God and to attend their church, would have but a momentary effect when he who should set them an example was parcus deorum cultor et infrequens" ("Heaven's niggard and unfrequent worshipper") (Horace, Odes, Book I, Ode 34, line 1).

Courtenay was described as follows by the genealogist Thomas Christopher Banks (1765–1854) in a letter to Lord Chancellor Brougham (1778-1868), who was an active force behind the decision of the House of Lords to revive the Earldom in his favour:

"One who ought to think himself happy that his titles and estates have not been forfeited, or himself paid the debt to the law like the Lord Hungerford of Heytesbury" (beheaded in 1541 for offences against the Buggery Act 1533), "one against whom a bill being found 'never ventured to put the question of guilt to a trial' but remained skulking abroad, afraid to venture on taking his seat in Parliament, his motto Ubi Lapsus, Quid Feci" (i.e. ancient motto of the Courtenay family, "Where did I slip, what have I done?") "putting a question which its owner avoids to leave to a tribunal of his country to answer".

=== Relationship with William Beckford ===
As a youth, 'Kitty' Courtenay was sometimes named by contemporaries as the most beautiful boy in England. Courtenay was homosexual and became infamous for his affair with William Beckford; they had met when Courtenay was eleven. Beckford, 8 years his senior, was a wealthy art collector and sugar plantation owner.

In the autumn of 1784, a houseguest overheard an argument between the then 16-year-old Hon. (his title at that time) William Courtenay and the then 24-year-old Beckford over a note of Courtenay's. There is no record of what the note said, but the houseguest said that Beckford's response on reading it was that he entered Courtenay's room and "horsewhipped him, which created a noise, and the door being opened, Courtenay was discovered in his shirt, and Beckford in some posture or other — Strange story." Beckford was subsequently hounded out of polite British society when his letters to Courtenay were intercepted by Courtenay's uncle, Lord Loughborough, who then publicised the affair in the newspapers.

== Later life ==
Courtenay was forced to live abroad, and lived in the United States where he owned a property on the Hudson River in New York. This was Claremont, the 100-acre estate of shipowner Michael Hogan at what is now Riverside Park. Courtenay took up residence in 1807, and from there watched the trial run of Robert Fulton's North River Steamboat. According to publisher Frank Leslie, Courtenay's land included the site of the Amiable Child Monument, the only single-person private grave on city-owned land in New York City. Around 1813, Courtenay moved to France, in Paris and in Draveil where he owned a castle.

In 1831, as The 3rd Viscount Courtenay, he successfully petitioned to revive the title of Earl of Devon for the head of the Courtenay family, that title having been dormant since 1556, and so became the 9th Earl.

He died on 26 May 1835 at age 66 in Paris due to natural causes. He was loved by his tenants, who insisted that he be buried in a stately fashion. He was buried on 12 June 1835 in Powderham. He died unmarried, and fathered no known children.

Peerage of England
Preceded by William Courtenay	Earl of Devon de jure until 1831; 1788–1835	Succeeded by William Courtenay
Preceded by William Courtenay	Viscount Courtenay; 1788–1835	Extinct
