= Amice de Clare =

English noblewoman (1220–1284)

- Seal of Amice de Clare. The shield depicts the arms of her husband Baldwin de Redvers, "a lion rampant". The device above the shield is likely to be a heraldic device of de Clare, part of her paternal armourials. Legend: "SIGILLUM AMITIAE COMITISSAE DEVONIAE" (seal of amicia, Countess of Devon)
- Born: c. 1220
- Died: 1284 (aged 63–64)
- Spouse(s): Baldwin de Redvers; Robert de Guines
- Children: 2
- Parents: Gilbert de Clare (father); Isabel Marshal (mother)
- Relatives: Richard de Clare (brother); Isabella de Clare (sister)

Amice or Amicia de Clare (c. 1220 – 1284) was the daughter of Gilbert de Clare, 4th Earl of Hertford and Isabel Marshal. She married, firstly, Baldwin de Redvers, 6th Earl of Devon, and secondly Robert de Guines. She founded Buckland Abbey.

== Family and children ==
In 1235 she married the 6th Earl of Devon and had issue:

1. Baldwin de Redvers, 7th Earl of Devon.
2. Isabella de Redvers, 8th Countess of Devon (or Isabella de Fortibus) (died 1293), married William de Forz, 4th Earl of Albemarle. After the death of her brother, she became Countess of Devon in her own right, and Lady of the Isle of Wight.
