= Baldwin de Redvers, 3rd Earl of Devon =

Earl of Devon from 1162 to 1188

Baldwin de Redvers, 3rd Earl of Devon (c. 1160–1188) was Earl of Devon from 1162 until his death and was feudal baron of Plympton in Devon. His birth is not attested; but he had a younger brother, and he was invested with the Earldom between the Pipe Rolls of 1185 and 1186, so he should not have been much over twenty-one.

Baldwin married Denise the heiress of Raoul, Prince of Déols, lord of Châteauroux and Charenton-du-Cher. After his death, she married André de Chauvigny.

Baldwin was succeeded by his brother, Richard de Redvers, 4th Earl of Devon.

== Footnotes ==
Peerage of England
Preceded by Richard de Redvers	Earl of Devon; 1162–1188	Succeeded by Richard de Redvers
