= Richard de Redvers, 4th Earl of Devon =

Fourth Earl of Devon, from 1188 to 1193

Richard de Redvers, 4th Earl of Devon (died 1193) was Earl of Devon from 1188 until his death and was feudal baron of Plympton in Devon.

He inherited the title on the death of his elder brother Baldwin de Redvers, 3rd Earl of Devon, who died childless. On his own death without issue, the title passed to his uncle, William de Redvers, 5th Earl of Devon, the third but only surviving son of the 1st Earl.

== Footnotes ==
Peerage of England
Preceded by Baldwin de Redvers	Earl of Devon; 1188–1193	Succeeded by William de Redvers
