= Baldwin de Redvers, 6th Earl of Devon =

English noble

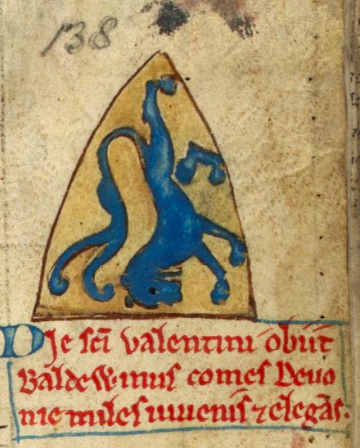
Matthew Paris recorded the death of Baldwin de Redvers, 6th Earl of Devon, in the year 1245.

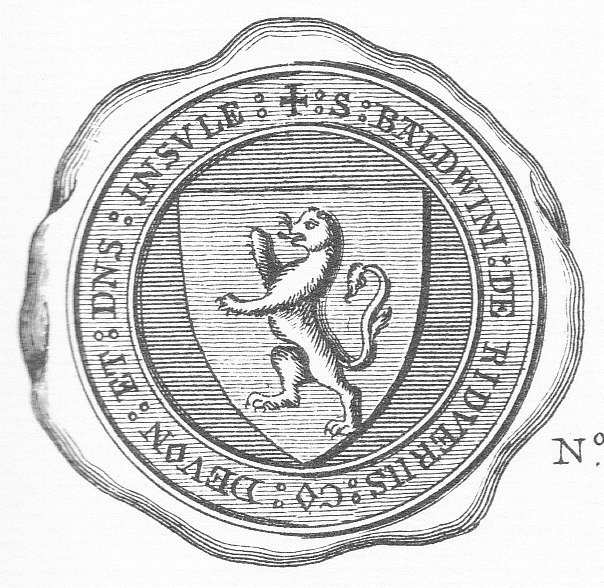
Seal of Baldwin de Redvers. Arms: a lion rampant. Legend: "S(IGILLUM) BALDWINI DE RIDVERIIS CO(MITIS) DEVON(IAE) ET D(OMI)N(U)S INSUL(A)E" (seal of Baldwin de Redvers, Count of Devon and of The Isle)

Baldwin de Redvers, 6th Earl of Devon (1217 – 15 February 1245), feudal baron of Plympton in Devon and Lord of the Isle of Wight, was the son of Baldwin de Redvers and Margaret FitzGerold and grandson of William de Redvers, 5th Earl of Devon.

== Career ==
Because Baldwin's father died at a young age, Baldwin was likely born posthumously. Although it is not recorded when he came of age and did homage for his lands, it is known that he was knighted by King Henry III and created sixth Earl of Devon on Christmas Day 1239 at Winchester.

In 1240 Baldwin departed to the Holy Land on the Barons' Crusade with a host of crusaders led by Richard of Cornwall.

== Family and children ==
In 1235 Baldwin married Amice de Clare (1220–1284), daughter of Gilbert de Clare, 4th Earl of Hertford and had the following children:

1. Baldwin de Redvers, 7th Earl of Devon.
2. Isabella de Redvers, Countess of Devon (or Isabella de Fortibus) (died 1293), married William de Forz, 4th Earl of Albemarle. After the death of her brother, she became Countess of Devon in her own right, and Lady of the Isle of Wight.

== Footnotes ==
Peerage of England
Preceded by William de Redvers	Earl of Devon; 1217–1245	Succeeded by Baldwin de Redvers
