= Gilbert de Clare, 5th Earl of Gloucester =

12th and 13th-century English nobleman

Gilbert de Clare
- 4th Earl of Hertford; 5th Earl of Gloucester; 1st Lord of Glamorgan
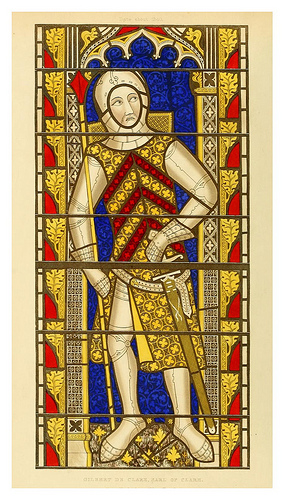
- Gilbert de Claire. Illustration taken from a stained glass window at Tewkesbury Abbey.

Hereditary
- Earl of Hertford Earl of Gloucester: 1217–1230 1225–1230
- Predecessor: Richard de Clare, 3rd Earl of Hertford
- Successor: Richard de Clare, 6th Earl of Gloucester
- Other titles: 7th Lord of Clare; 7th Lord of Tonbridge; 6th Lord of Cardigan
- Born: 1180; Hertford, Hertfordshire, England
- Died: 25 October 1230 (aged 49–50); Brittany, France
- Buried: Tonbridge Priory
- Family: de Clare
- Spouse: Isabel Marshal
- Issue: Richard de Clare, 6th Earl of Gloucester; Isabel de Clare; Agnes de Clare; Amice de Clare; William de Clare; Gilbert de Clare
- Father: Richard de Clare, 3rd Earl of Hertford
- Mother: Amice Fitz William, suo jure Countess of Gloucester
- Occupation: Peerage of England

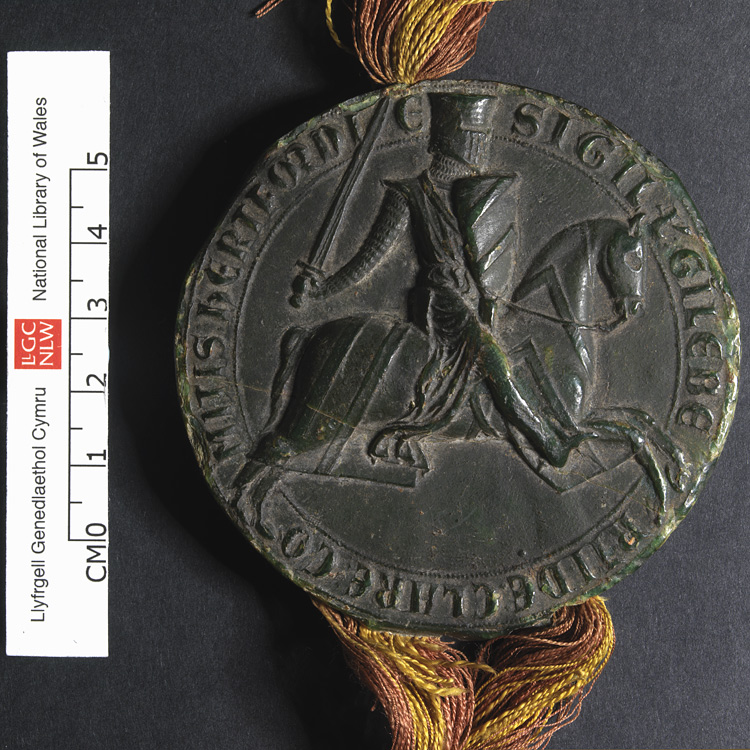
The Seal of Gilbert de Clare

Gilbert de Clare, 4th Earl of Hertford, 5th Earl of Gloucester, 1st Lord of Glamorgan, 7th Lord of Clare (1180 – 25 October 1230) was the son of Richard de Clare, 3rd Earl of Hertford (c. 1153–1217), from whom he inherited the Clare estates. He also inherited from his mother, Amice Fitz William, the estates of Gloucester and the honour of St. Hilary, and from Rohese, an ancestor, the moiety of the Giffard estates. In June 1202, he was entrusted with the lands of Harfleur and Montivilliers in Normandy.

== Life ==
During the baronial rebellion against king King John, he was associated with his father and in open opposition to the royalists. After the king's death in 1216, Gilbert and his father were supporters of Louis "le Dauphin" of France. After the Battle of Lincoln, the Clares returned to the Royalist side and were formally received into the king's peace and had their estates restored. Gilbert later married William Marshal's daughter and eventual coheiress Isabel in October 1214. At the death of his father on 28. November 1217, Gilbert was about thirty-eight years old and the sole heir to both the Clare and Gloucester honor. He assumed the title of earl of Gloucester and Hertford shortly after his father's death and obtained the seisin and livery of his patrimony. In 1223, he accompanied his brother-in-law, Earl Marshal, in an expedition into Wales. In 1225 he was present at the confirmation of Magna Carta by Henry III. While he was summoned for the campaign against Llywelyn ab Iorwerth, there are little indications as to what part he actually played in the fighting. In 1228, he led an army against the Welsh in the Kerry campaign against the prince of Gwynedd, capturing Morgan Gam, who was released the next year.

He then joined in an diplomatic mission to Brittany in the fall of 1230 for Henry III of England, but died on 25 October at Penros in that duchy. His body was brought back to England and buried at Tewkesbury Abbey. His arms were: Or, three chevronels gules.

== Issue ==
Gilbert de Clare had six children by his wife Isabel Marshal, great-grandmother of King Robert the Bruce:

- Agnes de Clare (b. 1218)
- Amice de Clare (1220–1287), who married Baldwin de Redvers, 6th Earl of Devon
- Richard de Clare, 6th Earl of Gloucester (1222–1262)
- Isabel de Clare (1226–1264), who married Robert de Brus, 5th Lord of Annandale. By him she was the grandmother of King Robert the Bruce
- William de Clare (1228–1258), he remained unmarried. He held lands from his brother Richard de Clare, 6th Earl of Gloucester in return for the service of a knight's fief. He was in service of his brother's retinue, both overseas and during his campaigns in Wales. As part of the baronial reform, he was entrusted with the administration of Winchester castle in June 1258, probably due to his brother's influence in court. He died the following month, allegedly poisoned by the Earl's seneschal Walter de Scoteny, who was colluding with opponents of the baronial reform.
- Gilbert de Clare (b. 1229), he had an ecclesial career.
- Petronilla de Clare, of Instow, Devon (b. abt. 1230 - 1320) Abbess of Canonleigh Abbey, Devon (1318). She married John St. John d. 1303, of Ashleigh, Devon, the younger brother of Roger St. John d. 1265 of Stanton-St. John and the elder half-brother of John Despenser. They acquired his brothers' lands (Stanton-St. John, Lageham, Swallowfield) after their rebellion and their lands were confiscated following the Battle of Evesham. This John St. John held Instow, Devon, by way of his wife for the Honour of Gloucester.

His widow Isabel later married the King of the Romans & Earl of Cornwall, Richard Plantagenet, of the House of Plantagenet.

== Arms ==
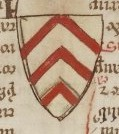
Gilbert's de Clare's coat of arms

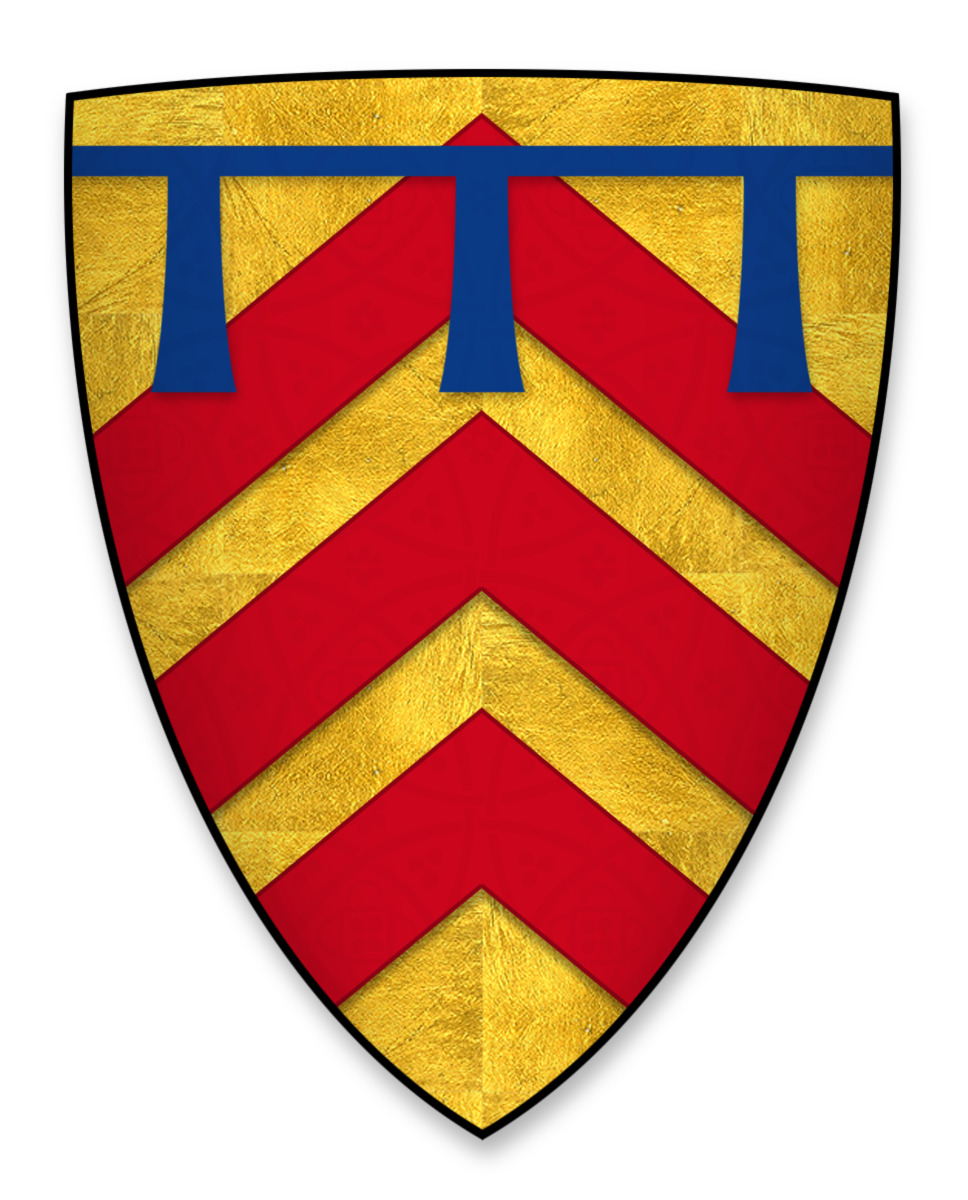
Arms used by Gilbert de Clare, as heir to the earldom of Hertford, and at the sealing of Magna Carta

== Footnotes ==
Peerage of England
Preceded by Richard de Clare	Earl of Hertford; 1217–1230	Succeeded by Richard de Clare
New creation	Earl of Gloucester; 1225–1230	Succeeded by Richard de Clare
