= Baldwin de Redvers, 1st Earl of Devon =

English noble

Baldwin de Redvers, 1st Earl of Devon (died 4 June 1155), feudal baron of Plympton in Devon, was the son of Richard de Redvers and his wife Adeline Peverel.

Baldwin was one of the first to rebel against King Stephen, and was the only first rank magnate never to accept the new king. He seized Exeter, and was a pirate out of Carisbrooke, but he was driven out of England to Anjou, where he joined the Empress Matilda. She made him Earl of Devon after she established herself in England, probably in early 1141.

Baldwin founded several monasteries, notably those of Quarr Abbey (1131), in the Isle of Wight, a priory at Breamore, Hampshire, and the Priory of St James, at Exeter. Some monastic chronicles call his father also Earl of Devon, but no contemporary record uses the title, including the monastic charters.

== Family and children ==
Baldwin married Adelize de Baalun (d. c. 1146). They had children:

1. Richard de Redvers, 2nd Earl of Devon. Married Denise de Dunstanville, the daughter of Reginald the first Earl of Cornwall.
2. Henry de Redvers
3. William de Redvers, 5th Earl of Devon. Married Mabel de Beaumont.
4. Matilda de Redvers, married to Anschetil de Greye.
5. Maud de Redvers, married Ralph de Avenel.
6. Alice de Redvers, married Roger II de Nonant.
7. Hawise de Redvers, by 1147 married Robert FitzRobert, Castellan of Gloucester. Robert was an illegitimate son of Robert, 1st Earl of Gloucester.
8. Eva de Redvers, married Robert d' Oyly.

Between 1151 and his death in 1155, Baldwin married Lucy de Clare. Lucy was assumed to have been the widow of Gilbert de Clare, 1st Earl of Hertford and a daughter of Ranulf earl of Chester. However, Gilbert de Clare died unmarried and without issue in 1152. One source states that Lucy was the daughter of Richard Fitz Gilbert de Clare and Adelisa of Chester. They were the parents of Gilbert de Clare, who died in 1152. Therefore, Lucy was a sister of Gilbert de Clare. A charter mentioning her late brother Gilbert de Clare and her late husband Baldwin was given shortly after Baldwin's death.

The name de Redvers can also be found as de Reviers or Revières.

== Footnotes ==
Peerage of England
New title	Earl of Devon; 1141–1155	Succeeded by Richard de Redvers
