= William de Redvers, 5th Earl of Devon =

English Earl

Arms of the de Redvers, adopted at the start of the age of heraldry (c. 1200–1215), probably by William de Redvers, 5th Earl of Devon (died 1217): Or, a lion rampant azure

William de Redvers, 5th Earl of Devon (died 10 September 1217) (or de Reviers), of Tiverton Castle and Plympton Castle, both in Devon, was feudal baron of Plympton in Devon.

== Origins ==
He was the son of Baldwin de Redvers, 1st Earl of Devon by his wife Adelize Ballon. William de Redvers is also known as William de Vernon, because he was brought up at Vernon Castle, in Normandy, the seat of his grandfather Richard de Redvers.

== Career ==
In 1194, De Redvers took part in the second coronation of King Richard the Lionheart (1189–1199), when the Canopy was supported by four Earls. He was a firm supporter of Richard's younger brother and heir King John (1199–1216), but after John's death, he permitted Falkes de Breauté, one of his mercenary captains, to seize De Redvers' widowed daughter-in-law, force a marriage, and take her dowry. These events are featured in Alfred Duggan's novel, Leopards and Lilies (1954).

== Marriage and issue ==
He married Mabel de Beaumont, a daughter of Robert de Beaumont, Count of Meulan by his wife Maud FitzRoy, a daughter and co-heiress of Reginald de Dunstanville, 1st Earl of Cornwall by his wife Beatrice FitzRichard. By Mabel de Beaumont he had one son who predeceased him and two daughters:

- Baldwin de Redvers (b. after 28 April 1200; d. 1 September 1216), eldest son and heir apparent, who predeceased his father aged under 16, having married Margaret FitzGerold, daughter and heiress of Warin FitzGerold (1167 – post-1216) (eldest son and heir of Henry FitzGerold (d.1174/5), Chamberlain to King Henry II) by his wife Alice de Curcy, sister and heiress of William de Curcy IV (d.1194) feudal baron of Stoke Curcy (now Stogursey) in Somerset and of Harewood in Yorkshire. He left a son Baldwin de Redvers, 6th Earl of Devon.
- Mary de Redvers, known as "Mary de Vernon", who married, firstly, Pierre des Preaux (Anglicised to "Peter Prouz" and Latinised as de Pratellis ("from the meadow")). Ralph Brooke (1553–1625), York Herald, and others, stated that her descendants by her first marriage were the "Prouse" family of Gidleigh Castle (built by William Prouz and of Chagford in Devon; the arms of de Redvers were quartered by this family, as is visible on the monument of Humphrey Prouse (d.1648) in Chagford Church. However, the Devonshire historian Sir William Pole (d.1635) was sceptical about Brooke's version of the pedigree which he could "hardly admytt without better proofe than theire allegacion", objecting that he had never encountered the Devonshire Prouses called de Pratellis in any documents, and that their name was instead Latinised as Probus ("upright, proud"). Mary de Redvers married, secondly, Robert de Courtenay (died 1242), feudal baron of Okehampton, Devon, son of Reginald II de Courtenay (died 1194) by his wife Hawise de Curcy (died 1219), heiress of Okehampton. From this marriage, the Courtenays later inherited the feudal barony of Plympton in 1293 and in 1335 were declared Earls of Devon. Robert de Courtenay (died 1242) was the great-grandfather of Hugh de Courtenay, 1st/9th Earl of Devon (d.1340).
- Joan de Redvers, who married William Brewere; she had been betrothed to Hubert de Burgh, 1st Earl of Kent, but the marriage did not proceed.

== Death and succession ==
He died on 10 September 1217 when his title passed to his grandson, Baldwin de Redvers, 6th Earl of Devon, his only son Baldwin de Redvers having predeceased him.

== Footnotes ==
Peerage of England
Preceded by Richard de Redvers	Earl of Devon; 1193–1217	Succeeded by Baldwin de Redvers
