= Grade II* listed buildings in Plymouth =

There are over 20,000 Grade II* listed buildings in England. This page is a list of these buildings in the district of Plymouth in Devon.

== City of Plymouth ==
Name	Location	Type	Completed (Note: The date given is the date used by Historic England as significant for the initial building or that of an important part in the structure's description.)	Date designated	Grid ref. (Note: The grid reference is based on the British national grid reference system, sometimes known as OSGB36, used by the Ordnance Survey.) Geo-coordinates	Entry number (Note: The "List Entry Number" is a unique number assigned to each listed building and scheduled monument by Historic England.)	Image
Amphitheatre in Grounds of Saltram House	Saltram Park, City of Plymouth	Garden Wall	Late 18th century	1 May 1975	SX5133355640; 50°22′55″N 4°05′33″W	1386231	Amphitheatre in Grounds of Saltram House More images
Garden Temple (known as Fannys Bower) in Grounds of Saltram House	Saltram Park, City of Plymouth	Belvedere	Late 18th century	1 May 1975	SX5194155764; 50°22′59″N 4°05′02″W	1386235	Garden Temple (known as Fannys Bower) in Grounds of Saltram House
Gardenhouse at Saltram House	Saltram Park, City of Plymouth	Summerhouse	c. 1772	29 March 1960	SX5158755692; 50°22′56″N 4°05′20″W	1386234	Gardenhouse at Saltram House More images
Orangery at Saltram House	Saltram Park, City of Plymouth	Orangery	1773	29 March 1960	SX5190555723; 50°22′58″N 4°05′04″W	1386238	Orangery at Saltram House More images
Stable Block at Saltram House	Saltram Park, City of Plymouth	Coachmans Cottage	Mid 18th century	29 March 1960	SX5210455541; 50°22′52″N 4°04′53″W	1386240	Stable Block at Saltram House More images
Gate Piers approximately 550 Metres South East of Saltram House	Saltram Park, City of Plymouth	Gate Pier		1 May 1975	SX5255855358; 50°22′47″N 4°04′30″W	1386236	Gate Piers approximately 550 Metres South East of Saltram House More images
Armada Memorial	Hoe, City of Plymouth	Commemorative Monument	1888	1 May 1975	SX4777953903; 50°21′55″N 4°08′30″W	1386461	Armada Memorial More images
Belmont House (Youth Hostel) Belmont Place	Stoke, City of Plymouth	Villa	1820	1 May 1975	SX4611155569; 50°22′47″N 4°09′57″W	1130060	Upload Photo
Boringdon Arch (triumphal Arch) and Triumphal Arch Cottage and Outbuilding	Plympton, City of Plymouth	Wall	1783	1 May 1975	SX5278157796; 50°24′06″N 4°04′22″W	1386330	Upload Photo
Building 13 (Receipt and Issue Magazine), RNOD, Bull Point	Royal Naval Ordnance Depot, Bull Point, City of Plymouth	Magazine	1853 to 1857	17 April 2009	SX4344657824; 50°23′58″N 4°12′15″W	1393253	Upload Photo
Church of St Andrew, Stoke Damarel	Stoke, City of Plymouth	Parish Church	15th century	25 January 1954	SX4633055001; 50°22′29″N 4°09′45″W	1386305	Church of St Andrew, Stoke Damarel More images
Church of St Aubyn including attached Walls and Walls to North and South	Devonport, City of Plymouth	Gate Pier	1771	25 January 1954	SX4545954697; 50°22′19″N 4°10′28″W	1130019	Upload Photo
Church of St Budeaux	St Budeaux, City of Plymouth	Parish Church	C13/C14	25 January 1954	SX4542859285; 50°24′47″N 4°10′37″W	1130049	Church of St Budeaux More images
Church of St Edward, King of the West Saxons	Eggbuckland, City of Plymouth	Parish Church	c. 1430	25 January 1954	SX4979757797; 50°24′03″N 4°06′53″W	1130025	Church of St Edward, King of the West Saxons More images
Church of St Mary	Tamerton Foliot, City of Plymouth	Parish Church	12th century	25 January 1954	SX4715260825; 50°25′38″N 4°09′12″W	1386426	Church of St Mary More images
Church of St Mary and All Saints	Plymstock, City of Plymouth	Parish Church	15th century	29 March 1960	SX5172353012; 50°21′30″N 4°05′09″W	1330541	Church of St Mary and All Saints More images
Church of St Mary Blessed Virgin	Plympton, City of Plymouth	Church	14th century	29 March 1960	SX5377156319; 50°23′19″N 4°03′30″W	1386222	Church of St Mary Blessed Virgin More images
Church of St Maurice	Plympton St Maurice, City of Plymouth	Parish Church	15th century	29 March 1960	SX5458255759; 50°23′01″N 4°02′48″W	1130037	Church of St Maurice More images
Church of St Paul	Stonehouse, City of Plymouth	Anglican Church	1831	25 January 1954	SX4642453757; 50°21′49″N 4°09′38″W	1117102	Church of St Paul More images
Covered Slip (S 180)	Devonport Dockyard, City of Plymouth	Slip Shed	1814	13 August 1999	SX4515154007; 50°21′56″N 4°10′43″W	1388431	Covered Slip (S 180) More images
Custom House	Barbican, City of Plymouth	Custom House	1820	1 May 1975	SX4818754223; 50°22′06″N 4°08′10″W	1386460	Custom House More images
Devonport High School for Boys	Stoke, City of Plymouth	School	1998	9 November 1998	SX4637954932; 50°22′27″N 4°09′42″W	1386309	Devonport High School for Boys More images
Dockyard Museum, Former Office (SO 32)	Devonport Dockyard, City of Plymouth	Fireproof Building	c. 1780	13 August 1999	SX4497254625; 50°22′16″N 4°10′53″W	1388408	Dockyard Museum, Former Office (SO 32)
Dockyard Wall Extending Approximately 300 Metres to South East Side Royal William Victualling Yard	Stonehouse, City of Plymouth	Wall	1830-1831	13 August 1999	SX4632353542; 50°21′42″N 4°09′43″W	1378537	Dockyard Wall Extending Approximately 300 Metres to South East Side Royal William Victualling Yard More images
Dovecote at Hardwick Farm	Hardwick, City of Plymouth	Dovecote	Late Medieval or 16th century	29 March 1960	SX5341055258; 50°22′44″N 4°03′47″W	1319610	Upload Photo
Drake Statue	Hoe, City of Plymouth	Statue	1884	1 May 1975	SX4770053902; 50°21′55″N 4°08′34″W	1386462	Drake Statue More images
Education Offices (former Grammar School)	Plympton St Maurice, City of Plymouth	Local Government Office	1952	23 April 1952	SX5462255726; 50°23′00″N 4°02′46″W	1322035	Education Offices (former Grammar School) More images
Eggbuckland Keep	City of Plymouth	Keep	Late 1860s to 1872	16 July 2004	SX5000858107; 50°24′13″N 4°06′43″W	1390897	Upload Photo
Elizabethan House Museum	Barbican, City of Plymouth	House	1926	25 January 1954	SX4825154057; 50°22′00″N 4°08′06″W	1386279	Elizabethan House Museum More images
Elliot Terrace, Numbers 1 to 8 including 6a and Walls and Gate Piers	Hoe, City of Plymouth	Terrace	Mid 19th century	1 May 1975	SX4751353953; 50°21′56″N 4°08′43″W	1386463	Elliot Terrace, Numbers 1 to 8 including 6a and Walls and Gate Piers More images
Former Palace Theatre and Great Western Hotel	Stonehouse, City of Plymouth	Hotel	1898	24 October 1974	SX4694554396; 50°22′10″N 4°09′13″W	1386483	Former Palace Theatre and Great Western Hotel More images
Former Royal Naval Hospital: the Quadrangle Centre, High St., the Quadrangle Centre Creykes, Gordon, Fellowes, Lyster and Sandon, Evans, Hornby, Dudding, Pryn and Norbury Court, Craigie Drive.	Stonehouse, City of Plymouth	House	Mid 1990s	1 May 1975	SX4659354661; 50°22′18″N 4°09′31″W	1113296	Upload Photo
Former Royal Naval Hospital Water Tower	Stonehouse, City of Plymouth	Cistern	1758-1780	1 May 1975	SX4676154819; 50°22′24″N 4°09′23″W	1113325	Upload Photo
HMS Drake Wardroom, Officers Quarters and Mess	Devonport, City of Plymouth	Officers Mess	1898-1902	1 May 1975	SX4499756685; 50°23′22″N 4°10′55″W	1386376	Upload Photo
Hooe Manor	Plymstock, City of Plymouth	Apartment	1960	29 March 1960	SX5016352207; 50°21′02″N 4°06′27″W	1330563	Upload Photo
Kings Hill Gazebo (S 186)	Devonport Dockyard, City of Plymouth	Gazebo	1822	13 August 1999	SX4516454042; 50°21′57″N 4°10′42″W	1388430	Upload Photo
Manadon House	Crownhill, City of Plymouth	House	16th century	1 May 1975	SX4799358366; 50°24′20″N 4°08′26″W	1386217	Upload Photo
Morice Gate, Two Gatehouses (MO 39 and 65) and attached Dockyard Walls	Devonport Dockyard, City of Plymouth	Gate	1720-1724	13 August 1999	SX4496654893; 50°22′24″N 4°10′54″W	1378549	Upload Photo
Mountbatten Tower	Plymstock, City of Plymouth	Coastal Battery	1660s	1 May 1975	SX4864453251; 50°21′35″N 4°07′45″W	1386253	Mountbatten Tower More images
Mutley Baptist Church Including Spurgeon Hall and Caretakers Cottage	Mutley, City of Plymouth	House	1907	4 June 1996	SX4837955626; 50°22′51″N 4°08′02″W	1386261	Mutley Baptist Church Including Spurgeon Hall and Caretakers Cottage More images
North Smithery (SO 23)	Devonport Dockyard, City of Plymouth	Blacksmiths Workshop	1808	13 August 1999	SX4486254618; 50°22′15″N 4°10′59″W	1388402	Upload Photo
Number 1, The Crescent and attached Forecourt Wall and Railings	Hoe, City of Plymouth	Terraced House	c. 1833	25 January 1954	SX4748054236; 50°22′06″N 4°08′46″W	1386444	Upload Photo
No 1 Basin and No 1 Dock, including associated bollards and capstans	Devonport Dockyard, City of Plymouth	Capstan	1897	13 August 1999	SX4472354485; 50°22′09″N 4°11′01″W	1388409	Upload Photo
No 2 Dock, including bollards and capstans	Devonport Dockyard, City of Plymouth	Capstan	1897	15 January 2016	SX4471854563; 50°22′11″N 4°11′02″W	1432153	No 2 Dock, including bollards and capstans
No 3 Dock, including bollards and capstans	Devonport Dockyard, City of Plymouth	Capstan	1897	15 January 2016	SX4470054621; 50°22′13″N 4°11′03″W	1432208	Upload Photo
No 4 Dock, including bollards and capstans	Devonport Dockyard, City of Plymouth	Capstan	1897	15 January 2016	SX4470054676; 50°22′15″N 4°11′03″W	1432211	Upload Photo
Number 12 the Painted Canvas Store (MO 46)	Devonport Dockyard, City of Plymouth	House	1777	13 August 1999	SX4487054880; 50°22′24″N 4°10′59″W	1378552	Upload Photo
Number 16 Store the Powder House (MO 42)	Devonport Dockyard, City of Plymouth	Powder Magazine	1744	13 August 1999	SX4490554958; 50°22′26″N 4°10′57″W	1378553	Upload Photo
Number 2 Store and Former Furbishers Shop (MO 68)	Devonport Dockyard, City of Plymouth	Carriage House	c. 1776	13 August 1999	SX4485054781; 50°22′21″N 4°10′59″W	1378550	Upload Photo
Number 4 Store (MO 70)	Devonport Dockyard, City of Plymouth	Ordnance Store	1722-1723	13 August 1999	SX4481654792; 50°22′21″N 4°11′01″W	1378551	Upload Photo
Officers House Number 1 and attached Walls and Railings, Royal William Victualling Yard	Cremyll St, Stonehouse, City of Plymouth	Naval Officers House	1830-1832	13 August 1999	SX4628153548; 50°21′42″N 4°09′45″W	1378538	Officers House Number 1 and attached Walls and Railings, Royal William Victualling Yard More images
Officers House Number 2 and attached Walls and Railings, Royal William Victualling Yard	Cremyll St, Stonehouse, City of Plymouth7	Naval Officers House	1830-1832	13 August 1999	SX4626453575; 50°21′43″N 4°09′46″W	1378539	Officers House Number 2 and attached Walls and Railings, Royal William Victualling Yard More images
Officers Terrace (SO 59) and attached Basement Area Railings	Devonport Dockyard, City of Plymouth	House	Early 19th century	1 May 1975	SX4495754540; 50°22′13″N 4°10′54″W	1378525	Upload Photo
Old Custom House	Barbican, City of Plymouth	Merchants House	1586	25 January 1954	SX4814654174; 50°22′04″N 4°08′12″W	1386456	Old Custom House More images
Pair of Gate Piers at Entrance to Boringdon Hall	Boringdon, City of Plymouth	Gate Pier	Late 17th century	1 May 1975	SX5394057744; 50°24′05″N 4°03′24″W	1330577	Upload Photo
Plym Bridge (that Part in South Hams District)	City of Plymouth	Road Bridge	Earlier	23 April 1952	SX5236458714; 50°24′35″N 4°04′45″W	1162902	Plym Bridge (that Part in South Hams District) More images
Railings, Piers and Gateway to Kings Hill Gazebo	Devonport Dockyard, City of Plymouth	Gate	1822	13 August 1999	SX4517654045; 50°21′57″N 4°10′42″W	1388429	Upload Photo
Rear Retaining Wall Extending approximately 400 Metres, Royal William Victualling Yard	Stonehouse, City of Plymouth	Stonemasons Yard	1827-1831	13 August 1999	SX4618353491; 50°21′40″N 4°09′50″W	1378541	Rear Retaining Wall Extending approximately 400 Metres, Royal William Victualling Yard More images
Remains of Castle	City of Plymouth	Keep	12th century or early 13th century	29 March 1960	SX5448055755; 50°23′01″N 4°02′54″W	1129995	Upload Photo
Royal Citadel Governors House and Steps to Doorways	The Barbican, City of Plymouth	Steps	Mid to Late C20	8 July 1998	SX4800853878; 50°21′54″N 4°08′18″W	1067143	Upload Photo
Royal Citadel Great Store	The Barbican, City of Plymouth	Barracks	1844	8 July 1998	SX4811453763; 50°21′51″N 4°08′13″W	1067144	Upload Photo
Royal Marine Barracks Archway Block	Stonehouse, City of Plymouth	Guardhouse	1867-1871	1 May 1975	SX4636454053; 50°21′59″N 4°09′42″W	1117103	Upload Photo
Royal Marine Barracks East Barrack Block and Forecourt Railings	Stonehouse, City of Plymouth	Barracks	1781-1783	1 May 1975	SX4645054068; 50°21′59″N 4°09′37″W	1117106	Upload Photo
Royal Marine Barracks North Barrack Block and Attached Basement Railings	Stonehouse, City of Plymouth	Barracks	c. 1860	1 May 1975	SX4639154128; 50°22′01″N 4°09′40″W	1244639	Upload Photo
Royal Marine Barracks Officers Mess	Stonehouse, City of Plymouth	Courtyard	1779-1785	1 May 1975	SX4643853969; 50°21′56″N 4°09′38″W	1244640	Upload Photo
Royal Marine Barracks South Block and Attached Basement Railings	Stonehouse, City of Plymouth	Railings	Late 19th century	1 May 1975	SX4640553976; 50°21′56″N 4°09′40″W	1244644	Upload Photo
Royal Marine Barracks South West Block and Attached Front Basement Railings	Stonehouse, City of Plymouth	Apartment	1907	1 May 1975	SX4637453978; 50°21′56″N 4°09′41″W	1244642	Upload Photo
Royal Marine Barracks the Longroom	Stonehouse, City of Plymouth	Assembly Rooms	1760	1 May 1975	SX4651653804; 50°21′51″N 4°09′34″W	1244646	Upload Photo
Sherwell Church and associated Buildings Including Shelly Hall	City of Plymouth	Church Hall	1864	18 November 1991	SX4811355044; 50°22′32″N 4°08′15″W	1386295	Sherwell Church and associated Buildings Including Shelly Hall More images
South Saw Mills (S 128, 148, 149, 150)	Devonport Dockyard, City of Plymouth	Fireproof Building	1856-1859	13 August 1999	SX4498654180; 50°22′01″N 4°10′52″W	1388413	Upload Photo
South Smithery (building S 126)	Royal Naval Dockyard, City of Plymouth	Blacksmiths Workshop	1771	4 March 2008	SX4493554234; 50°22′03″N 4°10′54″W	1392692	Upload Photo
St Dunstans Abbey and attached Road Frontage Walls	Stonehouse, City of Plymouth	Abbey	1850	1 May 1975	SX4693954980; 50°22′29″N 4°09′14″W	1386299	Upload Photo
St Dunstans Abbey School and Attached Road Frontage Walls	Stonehouse, City of Plymouth	Abbey	1850	1 May 1975	SX4687954927; 50°22′27″N 4°09′17″W	1386300	St Dunstans Abbey School and Attached Road Frontage Walls More images
St Michaels Lodge and Rear Basement Court Railings	Stoke, City of Plymouth	Villa	1827	1 May 1975	SX4588655129; 50°22′33″N 4°10′07″W	1130059	Upload Photo
Steps Dwarf Walls Lamps and Retaining Wall to Gardens Fronting Officers Terrace	Devonport Dockyard, City of Plymouth	Wall	1722	13 August 1999	SX4488254834; 50°22′22″N 4°10′58″W	1378554	Upload Photo
Plymouth Synagogue	City of Plymouth	Synagogue	1762	25 January 1954	SX4786954354; 50°22′10″N 4°08′26″W	1130015	Plymouth Synagogue More images
Tarred Yarn Store	Devonport Dockyard, City of Plymouth	Storehouse	1769	13 August 1999	SX4521754200; 50°22′02″N 4°10′40″W	1378504	Upload Photo
Tarring and Wheel House (S 136) and Tarred Yarn House (S 137)	Devonport Dockyard, City of Plymouth	Tar House	1763	13 August 1999	SX4520554238; 50°22′03″N 4°10′41″W	1378505	Upload Photo
The Distillery Public House, former Coates Gin Distillery	Barbican, City of Plymouth	First Floor Hall House	c. 1500	25 January 1954	SX4805354159; 50°22′04″N 4°08′16″W	1386410	The Distillery Public House, former Coates Gin Distillery More images
The Esplanade Numbers 1 to 8 and Forecourt Walls and Railings	Hoe, City of Plymouth	Villa	1836	25 January 1954	SX4759853947; 50°21′56″N 4°08′39″W	1386468	The Esplanade Numbers 1 to 8 and Forecourt Walls and Railings More images
The Guildhall	Plympton	Guildhall	1696	23 April 1952	SX5439555697; 50°22′59″N 4°02′58″W	1244435	The Guildhall More images
The Officers Terrace (MO 63) and attached Railings, Rear Walls and Outbuildings	Devonport Dockyard, City of Plymouth	House	1975	1 May 1975	SX4491254833; 50°22′22″N 4°10′56″W	1378564	Upload Photo
The Rectory	City of Plymouth	House	Late 19th century	23 April 1952	SX5454355671; 50°22′58″N 4°02′50″W	1244424	The Rectory More images
The Retreat	Plymstock, City of Plymouth	Detached House	Late 18th century	29 March 1960	SX5022452245; 50°21′04″N 4°06′24″W	1330566	Upload Photo
Devonport Dockyard: The Scrieve Board (S 162)	Devonport Dockyard, City of Plymouth	Mould Loft	1814-1821	13 August 1999	SX4485954124; 50°21′59″N 4°10′58″W	1388417	Devonport Dockyard: The Scrieve Board (S 162)
Tudor Lodge	City of Plymouth	Merchants House	17th century	29 March 1960	SX5443855672; 50°22′58″N 4°02′56″W	1244395	Upload Photo
Walls and Bollards to Number 3 Basin	Devonport Dockyard, City of Plymouth	Wall	1844-1848	13 August 1999	SX4487455635; 50°22′48″N 4°10′59″W	1378569	Upload Photo
White Yarn House (S 135)	Devonport Dockyard, City of Plymouth	Yarn House	1763	13 August 1999	SX4518554296; 50°22′05″N 4°10′42″W	1378503	Upload Photo
33 St Andrews Street	City of Plymouth	House	Late 16th century	25 January 1954	SX4794354301; 50°22′08″N 4°08′22″W	1386362	33 St Andrews Street More images
36 New Street	Barbican, City of Plymouth	House	Early 17th century	1 May 1975	SX4821854066; 50°22′01″N 4°08′08″W	1386283	Upload Photo
Nos. 17 and 18 New Street	Barbican, City of Plymouth	Jettied House	1599	25 January 1954	SX4825954074; 50°22′01″N 4°08′06″W	1386272	Upload Photo
34 New Street	Barbican, City of Plymouth	Merchants House	17th century	25 January 1954	SX4823554063; 50°22′01″N 4°08′07″W	1386281	Upload Photo
36 Looe Street	Barbican, City of Plymouth	House	C20	25 January 1954	SX4812954369; 50°22′10″N 4°08′13″W	1386208	Upload Photo
Western Morning News	Derriford, City of Plymouth	Office and production facilities	1992	22 July 2015	SX4955659261; 50°24′50″N 4°07′08″W	1425964	Western Morning News More images
Swing Bridge, Royal William Victualling Yard	Cremyll St, Stonehouse, City of Plymouth	Swing bridge	c1833-5	13 August 1999	SX4608853631; 50°21′45″N 4°09′55″W	1378540	Swing Bridge, Royal William Victualling Yard More images
