= Plympton Castle =

Ruined castle in Plympton, England

Coordinates: 50.3837°N 4.0486°W

- Plympton, England
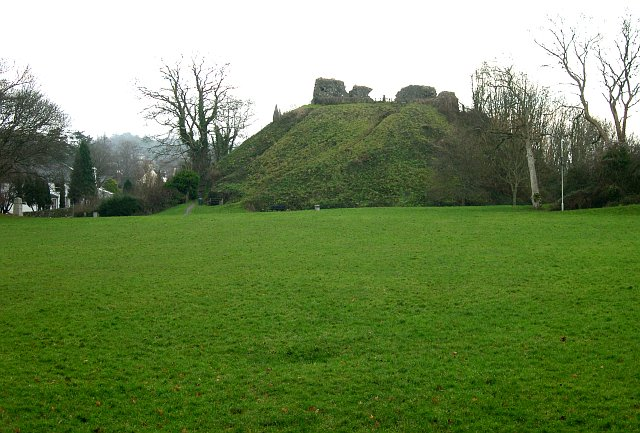

Site information
- Type: Castle
- Open to the public: yes
- Condition: Ruined

Location
- Grid reference: SX 54480 55755
- Height: 14m (motte height)

Site history
- Built: Late 11th century
- Built by: Richard or Baldwin de Redvers
- Demolished: 1640s

Garrison information
- Designations: Scheduled Ancient Monument, Grade II* listed building

Plympton Castle is a ruined medieval castle in Plympton, Devon, England. It stands above the Tory Brook, and may replace an older fortification. The castle was founded as an earth and timber motte-and-bailey in the late 11th century by either Richard de Redvers or his son, Baldwin de Redvers, 1st Earl of Devon. At this time, Plympton was the main settlement in the area, as nearby Plymouth (of which Plympton is now a suburb) had not yet developed. Plympton Priory was founded nearby in 1121, further increasing the settlement's importance. Baldwin was a staunch supporter of the Empress Matilda during The Anarchy, and Plympton Castle was captured and destroyed by the forces of King Stephen in 1136, along with his other castles of Exeter and Carisbrooke. Matilda made Baldwin Earl of Devon in 1141, and he may have rebuilt the castle in stone after this improvement in his fortunes. The present stone remains consist of a fragmentary shell keep, standing about 4m high, with walls about 3m thick. The shell keep was a circular wall on top of the motte, which would have contained residential buildings, and was a popular form in Devon and Cornwall (also seen, for instance, at Totnes and Trematon). A 14th century drawing suggests that the bailey also had stone buildings, including a gatehouse and a round tower. The castle was confiscated from Earl William de Vernon by King John in 1204, but returned the next year. Between 1218 and 1224 it was held by Falkes de Bréauté, a fearsome character who had fought for the Crown in the First Barons' War, but defied Henry III and Hubert de Burgh in 1224. Plympton was then besieged and taken by Robert de Courtenay and Falkes was exiled, losing all his lands. Falkes may have built a tower within the shell keep, which would have given the castle a similar appearance to Launceston.

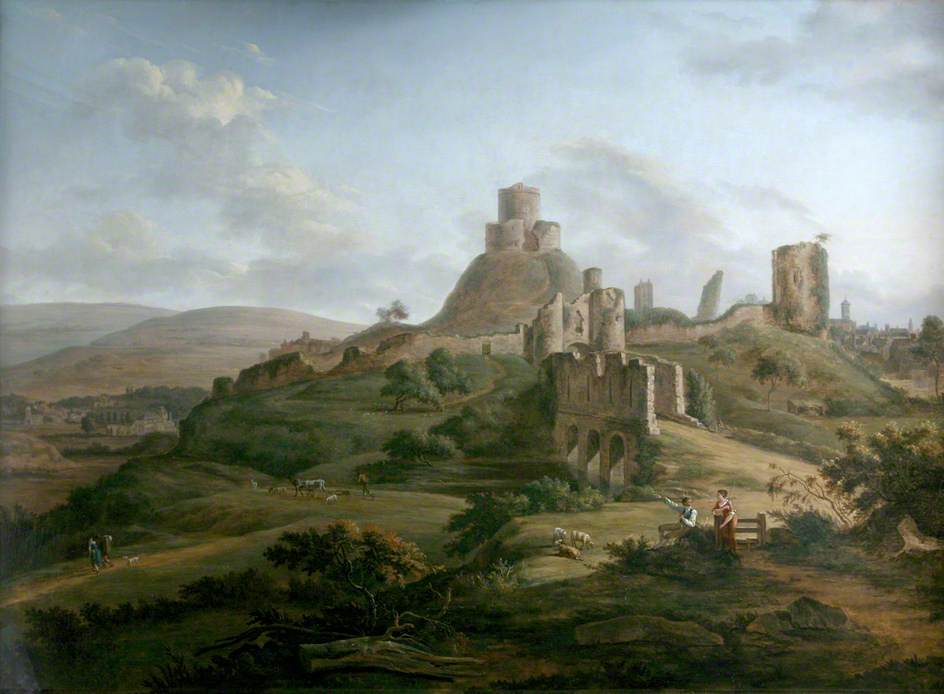
Launceston Castle, painted c.1762. Plympton may have had a similar double keep.

By this time, the town of Plympton was already in decline, as the River Plym silted up and its trade was eclipsed by the royal port at Plymouth. By the time of Leland's visit in 1539 (when it reverted to the Crown) the castle was 'utterly decayed'. Nonetheless, the bailey was occupied by Prince Maurice during the English Civil War, when he was besieging Plymouth. It was abandoned without any attempt at defence when Parliamentarian forces came to lift the siege in 1645, and any buildings still standing at this time were probably destroyed. The castle site is now a public park, while the standing ruins and earthworks are both a scheduled monument and a grade II* listed building.

== Gallery ==
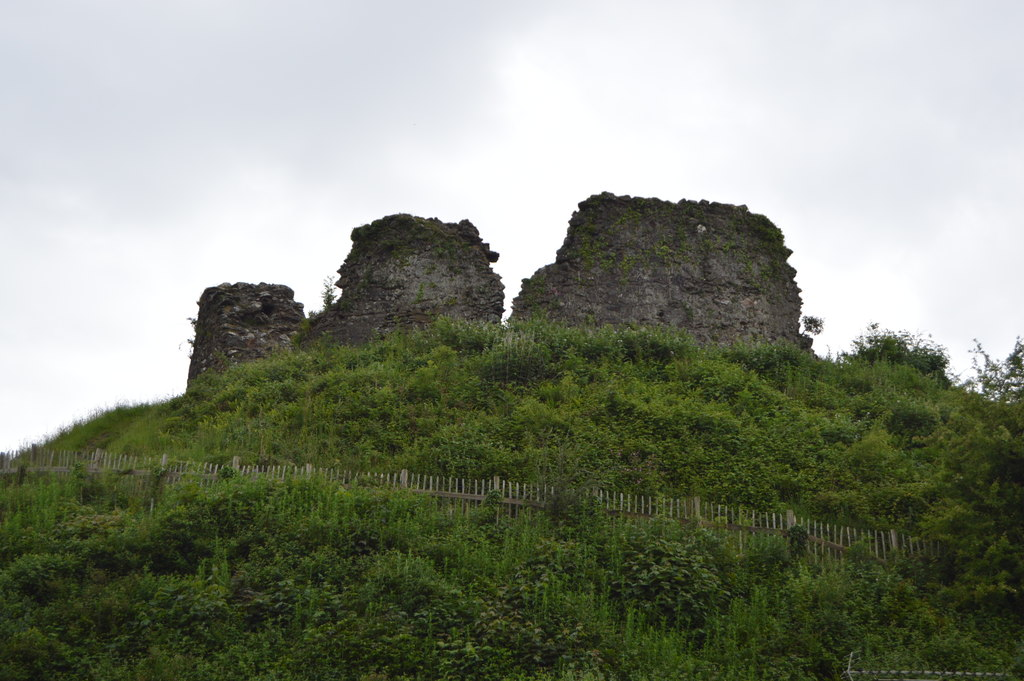
The remains of the shell keep

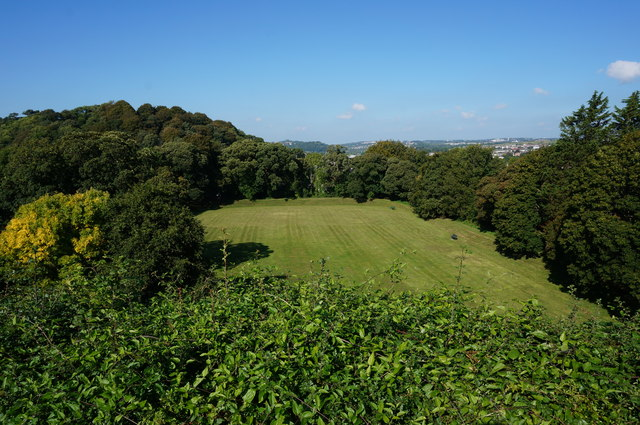
The bailey, viewed from the motte top
