= Plympton =

Suburb of Plymouth in Devon, England

Coordinates: 50.386°N 4.051°W

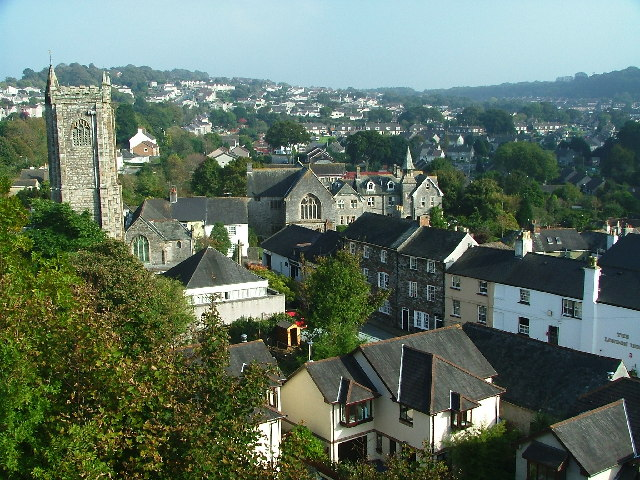
- Looking down on part of the town from the castle

- Location within Devon
- Population: 29,899 (2011 Census)
- OS grid reference: SX542561
- Unitary authority: Plymouth
- Shire county: Devon
- Region: South West
- Country: England
- Sovereign state: United Kingdom
- Post town: PLYMOUTH
- Postcode district: PL7
- Dialling code: 01752
- Police: Devon and Cornwall
- Fire: Devon and Somerset
- Ambulance: South Western
- UK Parliament: South West Devon

Plympton is a suburb of the city of Plymouth in Devon, England. It is in origin an ancient stannary town. It was an important trading centre for locally mined tin, and a seaport before the River Plym silted up and trade moved down river to Plymouth and was the seat of Plympton Priory the most significant local landholder for many centuries.

Plympton is an amalgamation of several villages, including St Mary's, St Maurice, Colebrook, Woodford, Newnham, Langage and Chaddlewood.

There are two secondary schools in Plympton, Hele's School and Plympton Academy.

== Toponymy ==
The earliest reference to Plympton dates from around 900 AD. The name derives from Old English Plymetun, meaning "plum tree farm". The name of the River Plym, and therefore of Plymouth, is a back-formation from both this name and that of Plymstock. There were historically two settlements bearing the name, distinguished as Plympton St Mary and Plympton St Maurice (from the dedications of their parish churches). The latter was also known as Plympton Erle, in reference to the Earl of Devon, whose castle stood here.

== History ==
Nearby is the Iron Age hill fort of Boringdon Camp. Plympton is listed in the Domesday Book of 1086 as being held by the king (William the Conqueror), with 27 villagers, 12 smallholders and 6 slaves.

In the early 12th century Plympton was the site of an important priory founded by William Warelwast. The members were Augustinian canons and the priory soon became the second richest monastic house in Devon (after Tavistock). The gatehouse of the priory is still in existence. In 1872 it was recorded that the gatehouse, kitchen and refectory were still in good condition.

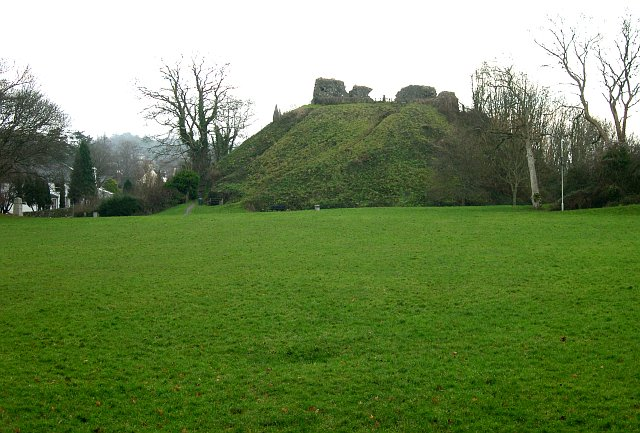
Plympton's motte and bailey castle

Richard de Redvers (died 1107) was granted the feudal barony of Plympton, based at Plympton Castle, by King Henry I (1100–1135), of whom he was a most trusted supporter. The de Redvers family later became Earls of Devon. Their lands, including Plympton, and titles were later inherited by the Courtenay family, feudal barons of Okehampton. The ancient Stannary town remains dominated by its now ruined Norman motte-and-bailey castle and it still retains a cohesive medieval street pattern. A number of historic buildings in the local vernacular style of green Devon slate, limestone and lime-washed walls, with Dartmoor granite detailing, attest to all periods of its history.

Before the Reform Act 1832 the town was one of the rotten boroughs, and sent two MPs to the unreformed House of Commons.

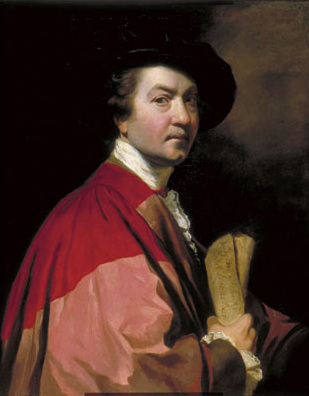
Sir Joshua Reynolds in a self-portrait

The town was the birthplace and early residence of the painter Sir Joshua Reynolds (1723–1792) who became the first president of the Royal Academy of Arts. He was mayor of Plympton in 1773. His father was headmaster of Plympton Grammar School which is a historic building in the centre of the town. Former pupils were Benjamin Haydon and Sir Charles Lock Eastlake, PRA, who were respectively first director of the National Gallery and first president of the Royal Photographic Society. Many of Reynold's paintings were purchased by his friends the Parker family of local Saltram House, now owned by the National Trust, and are still on public display there.

The population of Plympton-St Maurice at the time of the 1841 census was 933 inhabitants.

== Architecture ==
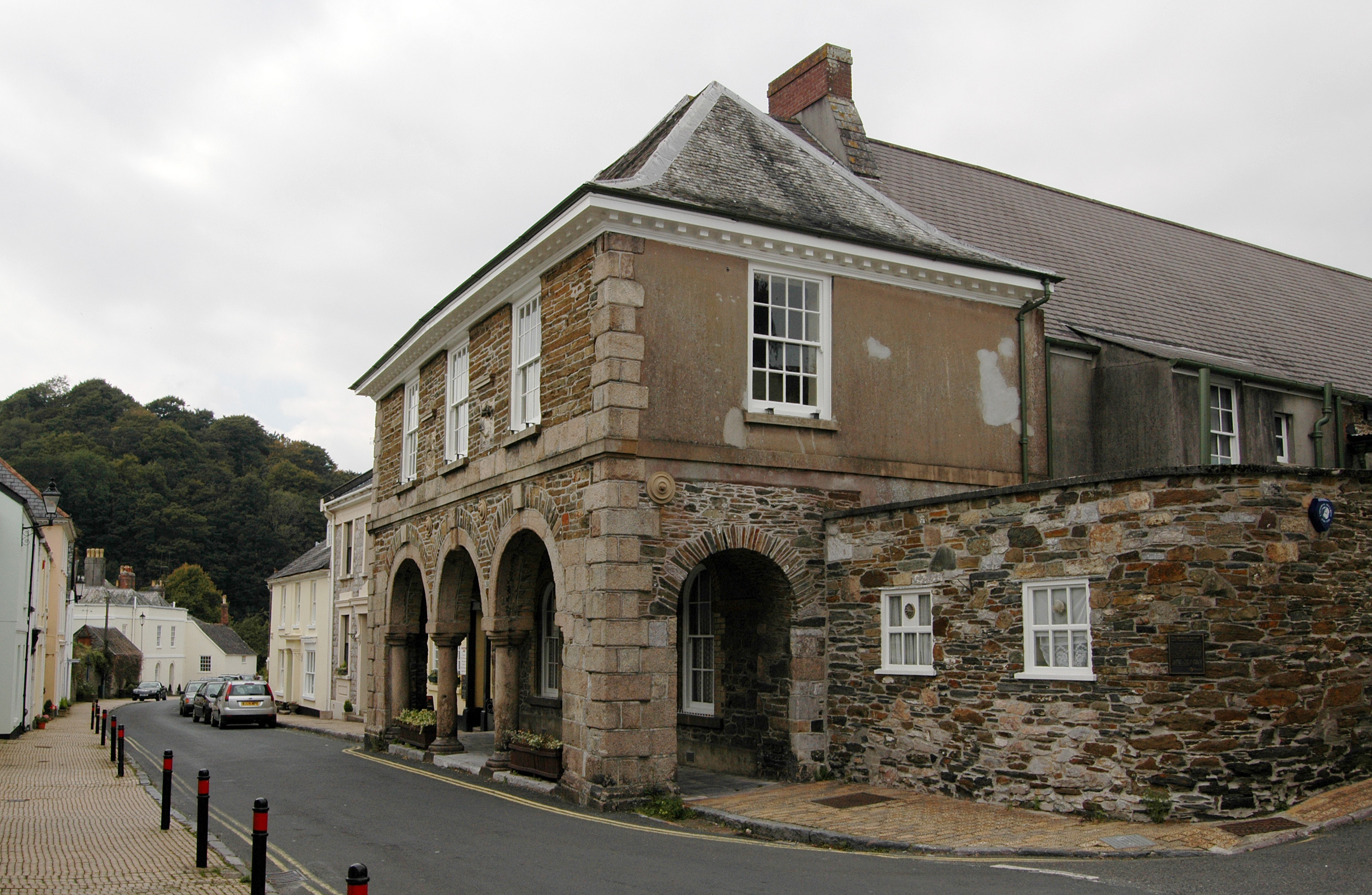
The Guildhall

Plympton has 68 listed buildings in the database of Historic England. Of these, one is Grade I (Plympton House, St Peter's Convent), six are Grade II* and 61 are Grade II.

Fore Street, the town's main street, is lined with mediaeval buildings, around thirty of which are either Grade II* or Grade II listed. The Grade II* buildings are The Old Rectory, the Guildhall and Tudor Lodge.

=== Historic estates ===
The manor of Boringdon in Colebrook was a seat of the Parker family formerly of North Molton, which later acquired Saltram.

Loughtor (after c.1718 renamed Newnham Park) was the seat of the Selman family, of whom several were MPs. William Selman II was five times MP for Plympton Erle between 1420 and 1429. The estate was later a minor seat of a cadet branch of the Courtenay family.

Newnham was a manor that was the seat of the Strode family, whose monuments exist in St Mary's Church.

== Churches ==
Plympton has two churches. The Church of St Thomas at Plympton St Maurice (also known as the Church of St Maurice) is of Norman origin.

St Mary's church was dedicated in 1311 and was originally a parish chapel attached to Plympton Priory. It has two aisles on each side of the nave, the outer aisles being shorter than the inner ones. The tower, built of granite ashlar, is visible from afar. The south porch is ornamented with carving and has a lierne vault. The outer north aisle is the earliest part of the church and the rest is mainly of the 15th century, the south aisle being the latest part. There are monuments to the Strode family, including a tomb-chest for Richard Strode (died 1464), the effigy being clad in armour. The monument of William Strode (died 1637) and his family shows husband, two wives and ten children. There is also a monument of W. Seymour (died 1801) in Coade stone and of Viscount Boringdon, the 11-year-old heir to the Earl of Morley of Saltram House who died in Paris in 1817, by François-Nicolas Delaistre.

== Modern Plympton ==
Between about 1990 and 2010 Plympton has seen considerable growth as the suburban population of Plymouth has doubled. To help manage this rapid growth more efficiently, Plympton has been separated into a series of separate districts: Yealmpstone, Plympton-St Maurice, Colebrook, Underwood, Woodford and Chaddlewood.

=== Community Council ===
Plympton has a Community Council that was established when the town joined the Plymouth Local Authority area in 1967. The council is based at Harewood House and is a voluntary organisation serving as a forum for coordination and cooperation between social, recreational, voluntary, and community organisations in Plympton.

The Community Council decided that a notable Plympton resident should represent the town, for example by opening fetes and attending civic events as the representative of Plympton. In 1980 the first modern Stannator was elected to take up this role. In more recent times, a Youth Ambassador has also been elected to represent the young people of Plympton and attend events alongside the Stannator. The Stannator and Youth Ambassador are elected for a period of one year and invested at a ceremony at Harwood House on the third Saturday evening of April each year.

There have been 45 modern Stannators of Plympton.

Year(s)	Name
1980-81	Mr W Harvey
1981-82	Mr W Jarvis
1982-83	Cllr J Stopporton
1983-84	Dr K Clapton
1984-85	Mr E Westlake
1985-86	Mrs M Lynden
1986-87	Mr J Currie
1987-88	Cllr A Wright
1988-89	Mrs W Smith
1989-90	Mr G Morris
1990-91	Mr K Yabsley
1991-92	Mrs D Sinstadt
1992-93	Mr J Boulden MBE
1993-94	Mrs P Burrows
1994-95	Preb J Richards
1995-96	Mrs K Roberts
1996-97	Mr J Pook
1997-98	Mr W Coleman
1998-99	Mrs M Easterbrook
1999-00	Mrs S Boulden JP
2000-01	Mr T Latter
2001-02	Mr J Willis
2002-03	Mrs M Knight
2003-04	Mrs U Griffiths
2004-05	Mrs N Chinner
2005-06	Mr F Mills
2006-07	Mr A C Street
2007-08	Mrs G Banfield
2008-09	Mr R T Coleman
2009-10	Mrs M Crabb
2010-11	Mr R W Shaw
2011-12	Mr F Lethbridge
2012-13	Mrs P Kadoche
2013-14	Mrs P Ridgeway
2014-15	Mrs S Luscombe
2015-16	Mr J Gilding
2016-17	Mrs R Hamley
2017-18	Mr A Hill
2018-19	Mrs N Harrison
2019-22	Mrs F Smith ARRC
2022-23	Pastor A Bessel
2023-24	Mr A Cooper
2024-25	Mr D Partridge
2025-26	Mrs C Loft
2026-27	Mr L Hills

The Community Council also appoints Honorary Stannators to reward individuals who have made exceptional contributions to Plympton but do not live in the area. Four Honorary Stannators have been designated including Mrs M Sampson, Mr P Armson, Preb. Rev. M Cameron, and Mr A Briggs.

There have been six Youth Ambassadors of Plympton.

Year(s)	Name
2017-18	Mr Isaac Hudson
2018-19	Miss Molly Disney
2019-22	Miss Charlotte Bryant
2022-23	Miss Bel Winsor-Maloney
2023-24	Mr Oliver Chard
2024-25	Mr Christopher Turner
2025-26	Miss Grace Nicholls

=== Public transport ===
Plympton has six main bus services: routes 20A, 21, 21A which are operated by Plymouth Citybus and service 4, 52 & 59 which are operated by Stagecoach Southwest.

In the past, railway facilities were originally provided at Plympton – for goods traffic only – by the horse-drawn Plymouth and Dartmoor Railway, but their branch was closed and sold to the South Devon Railway to allow them to build a line from Exeter to Plymouth. A station was opened in the town on 15 June 1848. From 1 June 1904 it was the eastern terminus for enhanced Plymouth area suburban services but it was closed to passenger traffic from 3 March 1959 and all goods related traffic from June 1964.

In addition to this railway connected to the National rail network there is also The Plym Valley Railway which is a preserved railway based at the reconstructed Marsh Mills station on Coypool Road. This was formerly part of the GWR Plymouth to Launceston branch line. The volunteer-run PVR is actively rebuilding the line between Marsh Mills and Plymbridge. Steam and diesel heritage trains run on numerous Sundays throughout the year.

Plymouth City Council support the opening of a railway station on the South Devon Main Line, which runs through the middle of Plympton, to provide frequent services into the city centre. The entirety of eastern Plymouth lacks rail connectivity, despite being bisected by a passenger line. But there are major obstacles to providing such a service on a primarily inter-regional rail route, shown when Ivybridge – on the same line – gained a new station in 1994. The council support the reopening of the station to deal with bad traffic congestion in the wider area. After a feasibility study in 2017, a Plymouth Joint plan was opened for consultation in 2018 which included a suggested 'Plymouth Metro' with a station at Plympton. Peninsula Transport, a local transport advocacy body, intends to submit a full business case for the station's reopening by May 2027.

=== Schools ===
Plympton has two state secondary schools serving pupils from ages 11–18. Both Plympton Academy and Hele's School attract students from the Plympton area and surrounding areas of Laira, Ivybridge and Dartmoor.

=== Sports ===
Amateur club Plympton Athletic F.C. are members of the Devon Football League South and West Division as of 2020. Their home is the Lee Moor Stadium.

Plympton Victoria Rugby Club are the local rugby team.

Plympton Hash House Harriers, a well attended running club that runs (in a Hashing way) around Plymouth but retains its core identity to the village, often runs here.

=== Events ===
Plympton has hosted an annual fete called 'The Lamb Feast' for many years on the local Castle Green. A key part of Plympton's Midsummer Festival in mid June, the Lamb Feast and surrounding activities span over the weekend, organised by the Plympton Civic Association.

== Notable residents ==
- Elizabeth Johnson, religious pamphleteer, born in Plympton in 1721
- Ellen Marriage, pioneer Balzac translator, and her husband Edmund Garrett, an Ibsen translator, lived here up to Garrett's death in 1907
- David Owen, former Foreign Secretary, born in Plympton
- Sir Joshua Reynolds, painter, born in Plympton
- Paul Rogers, actor, born in Plympton
- Sir Edwin Sandys, founded the colony of Jamestown, was an MP for Plympton
- Richard Strode, MP for Plympton, established Parliamentary privilege
- William Warelwast, buried here (in the priory)
