= Tudor Lodge, Plympton =

Building in Plymouth, Devon, England

Tudor Lodge
- Location within Devon Tudor Lodge, Plympton (England)

General information
- Location: 63 Fore Street, Plympton, Devon, England
- Coordinates: 50.38288°N 4.0488°W
- Completed: late 17th century

Technical details
- Floor count: 2 (plus attic)

Tudor Lodge is a Grade II* listed building in Plympton, Devon, England. Standing at 63 Fore Street, Plympton's main street, it dates to the late 17th century.

A former merchant's house, it is timber-framed and boarded to the second tier, with rendered rubble to the ground floor. The 18th-century pilastered doorcase has moulded entablatures either side of it.

A wide carriage-entrance passage on the right displays part of the cellar in its wall.

The building was evaluated by Time Team during their visit to Plympton in 1999. Its basement walls were found to be pre-17th century due to the fact that a chamfered beam at head height in the basement was believed to have formerly sat on top of a wall (the others around it still being in place today), taking the line of the roof upwards.
