= Plympton Academy =

Plympton Academy, Plympton

Location
- Moorland Road; Plympton; Plymouth, Devon, PL7 2RS; England
- Coordinates: 50.3887954°N 4.0537565°W

Information
- Type: Academy
- Motto: Inspiring Success
- Local authority: Plymouth
- Department for Education URN: 136556 Tables
- Ofsted: Reports
- Principal: Some guy called Willis
- Staff: 104
- Years offered: 7-13
- Gender: Co-educational
- Age: 11 to 18
- Enrolment: 931
- Colours: Grey, purple and black
- Website: http://www.plympton.academy

Plympton Academy (formerly, The Ridgeway School and, before that, Plympton County Secondary School) is a state secondary school in Plympton, Plymouth, England. It is a mixed, non-denominational academy school.

In 2022, it joined the Thinking Schools Academy Trust (TSAT) to become part of a multi-academy trust (MAT).

Its designated feeder primary schools are Chaddlewood Primary School, Glen Park Primary School, Plympton St Maurice Primary School, and Yealmpstone Primary School, although other primary schools also send children to Plympton Academy.

The school has a sports centre, which includes a fitness gym, multiple sports hall, cricket pitch, rugby pitch, and in the summer, an athletics grass circuit. The sports hall was renovated in 2015. The sports hall and gym is open to the public for a small fee.

The school also includes a Performing Arts Centre called the "Morpurgo Studios" opened by Micheal Morpurgo in 2019. It has a state of the art recording studio, a professional dance studio and a fully equipped 500 seater theatre.

The school also has an internal sixth form which accepts students from all schools across the Plymouth consortium.
