= Shell keep =

Type of medieval fortification

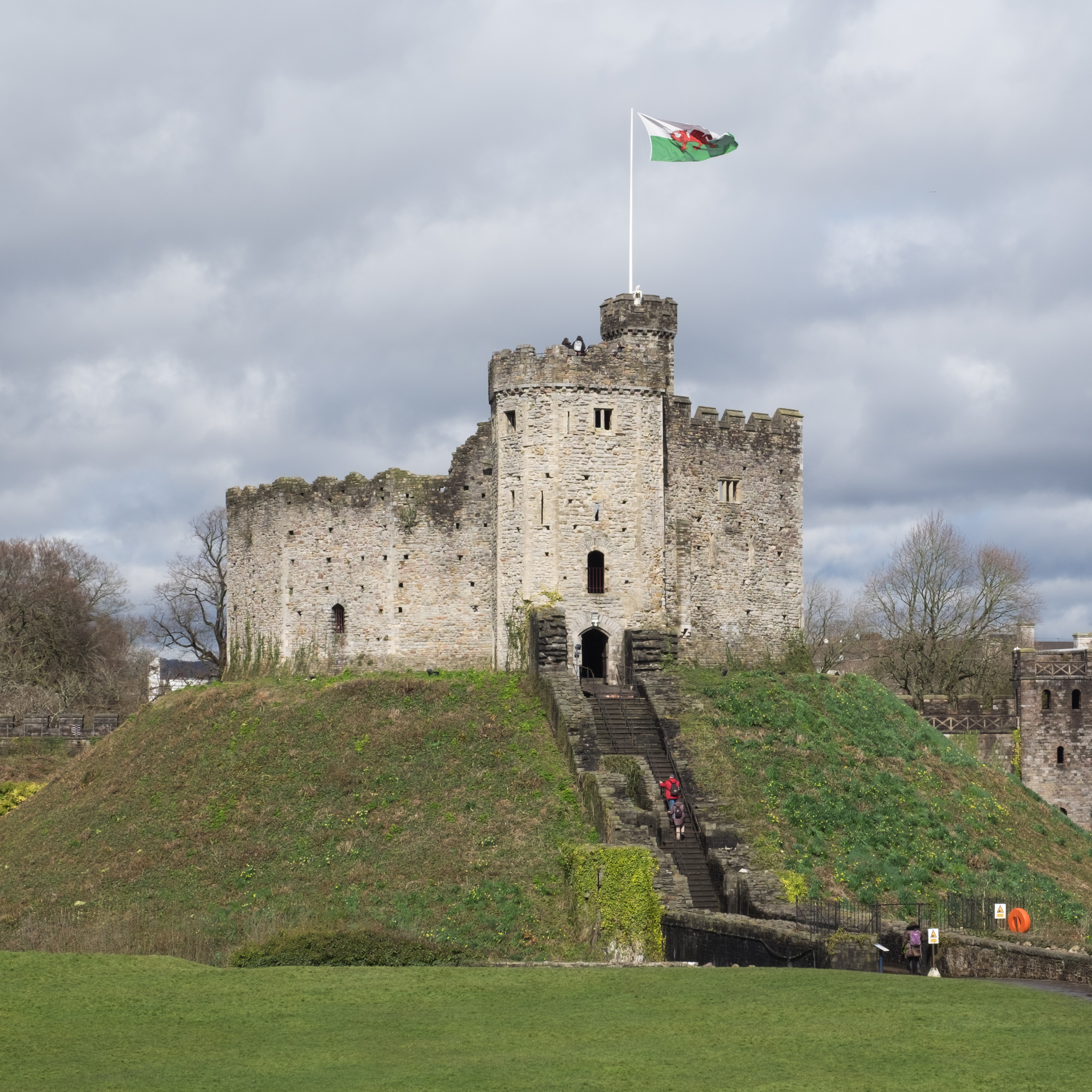
The shell keep of Cardiff Castle. The gate tower is a later addition.

A shell keep is a form of medieval fortification, best described as a stone structure encircling the top of a motte.

In English castle morphology, shell keeps are perceived as the successors to motte-and-bailey castles, with the wooden fence around the top of the motte replaced by a stone wall. Castle engineers during the Norman period did not trust the motte to support the enormous weight of a stone tower keep (though this was occasionally attempted, as at Duffus Castle, Moray). A common solution to this problem was to replace the palisade with a stone wall and then build wooden buildings backing onto the inside of the wall.

== Examples ==
A gazetteer compiled by archaeologist Robert Higham counted 21 shell keeps in England and Wales. The majority were built in the 11th and 12th centuries. However, the form remained fashionable in Devon and particularly Cornwall into the later Middle Ages, with the shell keep-like castle at Restormel being built in the 1270s or '80s, and the keep at Totnes being rebuilt in the 14th century. Shell keeps are also occasionally seen in mainland Europe, as at Gisors and Leiden.

Surviving examples of shell keeps include:

- Arundel, West Sussex
- Berkhamsted, Hertfordshire (fragmentary)
- Cardiff, Glamorgan
- Carisbrooke, Isle of Wight
- Castle Acre, Norfolk (shell keep around an earlier manor house, later converted to a hall keep)
- Clare, Suffolk (part of wall on motte only)
- Gisors, Normandy, France (surrounding an octagonal tower)
- Launceston, Cornwall (surrounding a later tower)
- Lewes, East Sussex – two mottes
- Leiden, South Holland, The Netherlands
- Lincoln, Lincolnshire – two mottes
- Pickering, North Yorkshire (fragmentary)
- Plympton, Devon (fragmentary)
- Tamworth, Staffordshire (later internal buildings)
- Totnes, Devon (rebuilt 14th century)
- Tretower, Powys (surrounding a later tower)
- Trematon, Cornwall
- Warwick, shell largely demolished and incorporated into bailey wall post-medieval
- Wigmore, Herefordshire
- Windsor, Berkshire (re-modelled and heightened post-medieval)
- Wiston, Pembrokeshire (fragmentary)

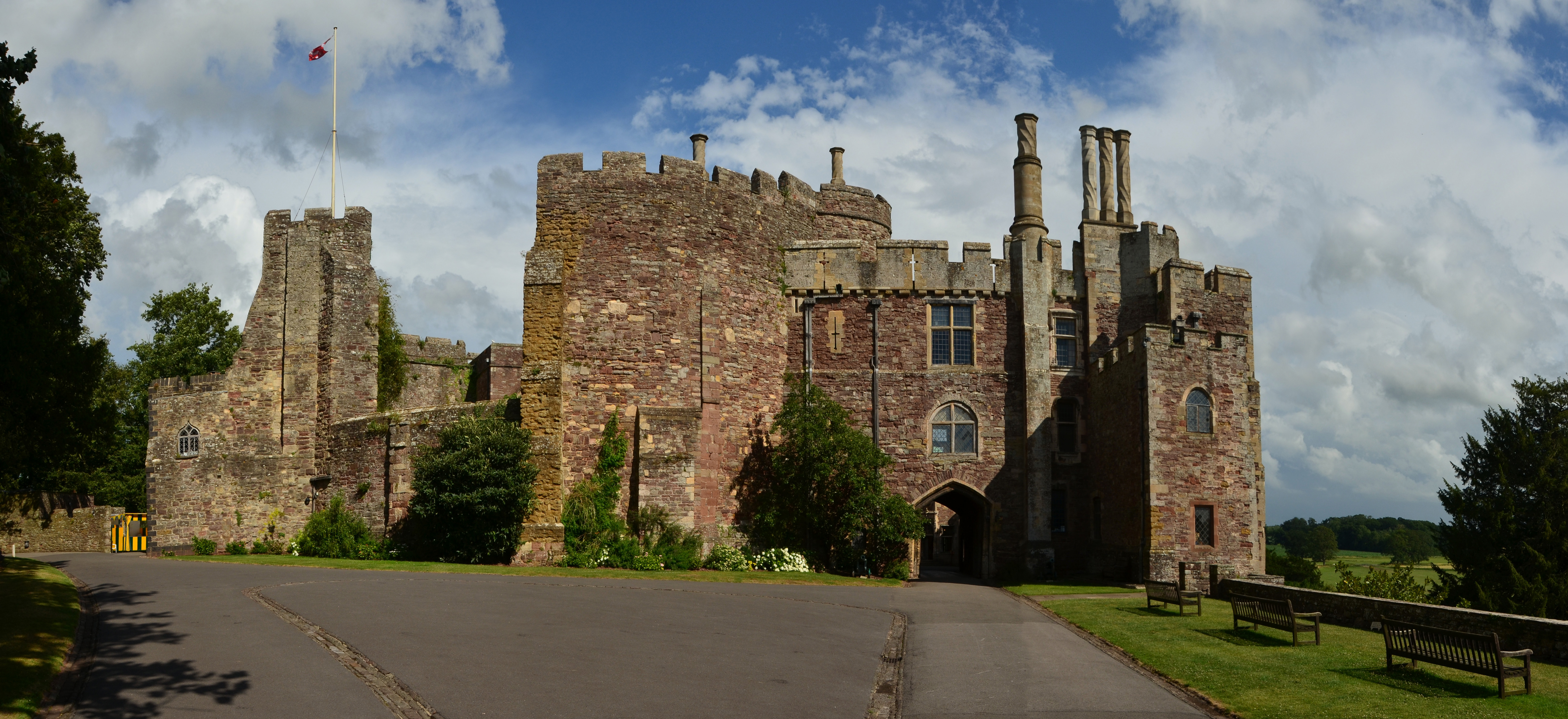
Berkeley Castle. The breach in the wall on the left was made in the Civil War, and shows the level of the enclosed motte. The gatehouse on the right leads to the bailey.

In addition Farnham and Berkeley castles have stone enclosed mottes which may be interpreted as shell keep variations. Farnham's shell keep replaced a stone tower on the motte, demolished in the Anarchy, while Berkeley has a forebuilding more akin to those of tower keeps than other shell keeps. At both sites, the complete encasement of the motte provides a larger area within the shell wall. At other sites such as Durham, Warkworth, Clifford's Tower (York) and Sandal (Wakefield), shell keeps may have evolved into a tower proper. Clifford's Tower is often misinterpreted by modern visitors as a shell keep due to damage sustained during an explosion in 1684, which removed the roof and its central supporting masonry. True shell keeps were a stone wall around the upper perimeter of the motte with lean-to buildings against this outer wall and a small courtyard in the middle.

Although Restormel Castle is often considered the archetypal shell keep, it sits uncomfortably within the category. Rather than being built on a motte, it occupies a wide, low platform, with the earth piled against the walls to give a motte-like appearance. In addition, the curtain wall encloses what is essentially a complete manor house, forming the lord's primary accommodation rather than supplementing that in the bailey. For this reason some historians, such as Jeremy Ashbee, consider the structure to be an inner ward rather than a "true" shell keep. Similar circumstances apply at Alnwick Castle, where the present 14th and 19th century keep (or inner ward) incorporates parts of what may have been a large 12th century shell keep on a low mound.

Unusually Lewes and Lincoln castles both feature two separate mottes which may have had shell keeps upon both of them. The reason for this is unclear but given that Lincoln Castle is adjacent to the cathedral, one shell keep may have been for the castellan (castle holder) and the other for the bishop. In each case, only one shell keep survives.

== Gallery ==
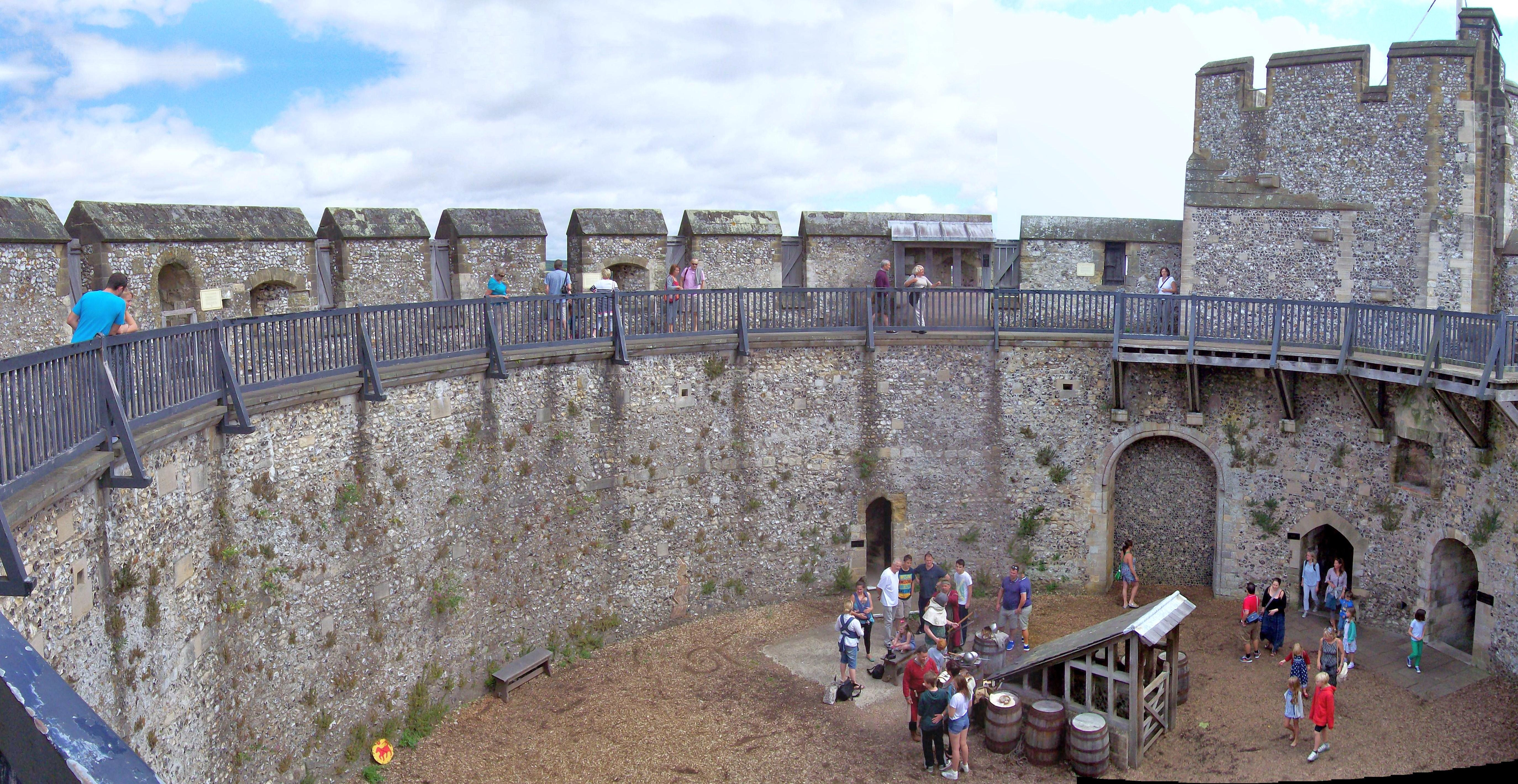
The interior of the keep at Arundel Castle

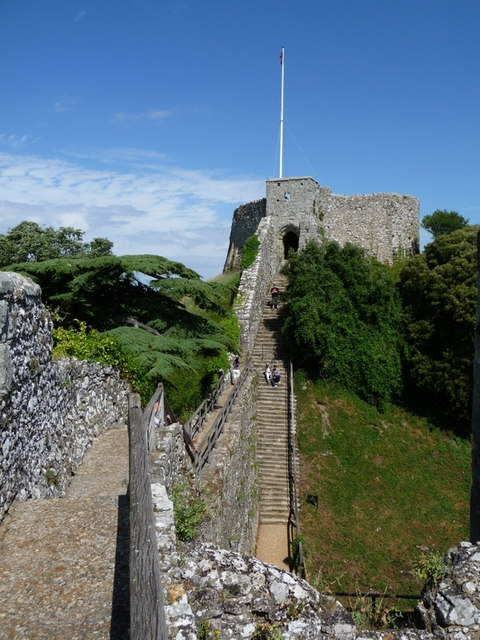
Carisbrooke Castle, viewed from the bailey wall-walk. The gate tower is a later addition

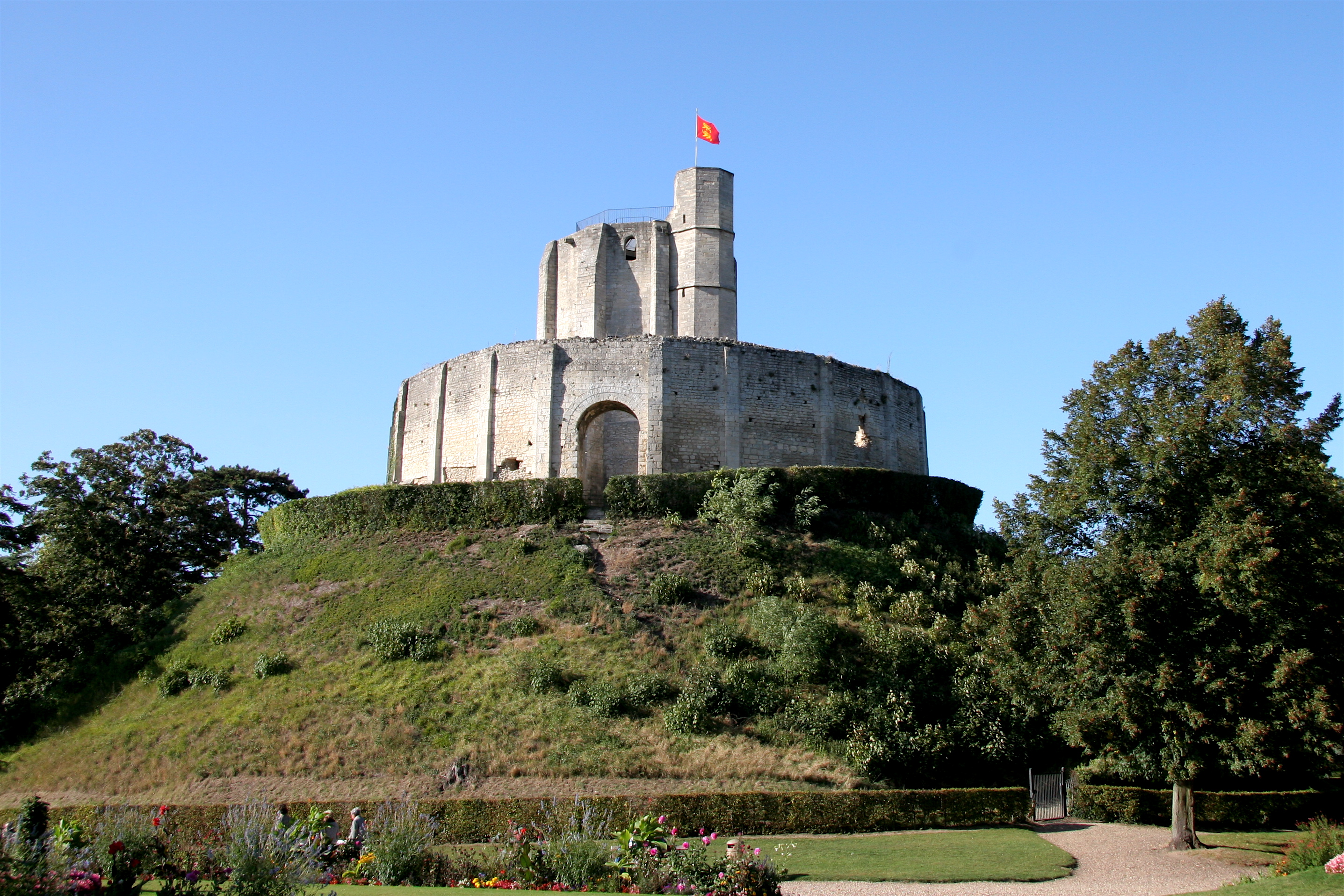
The shell keep and inner tower at Gisors

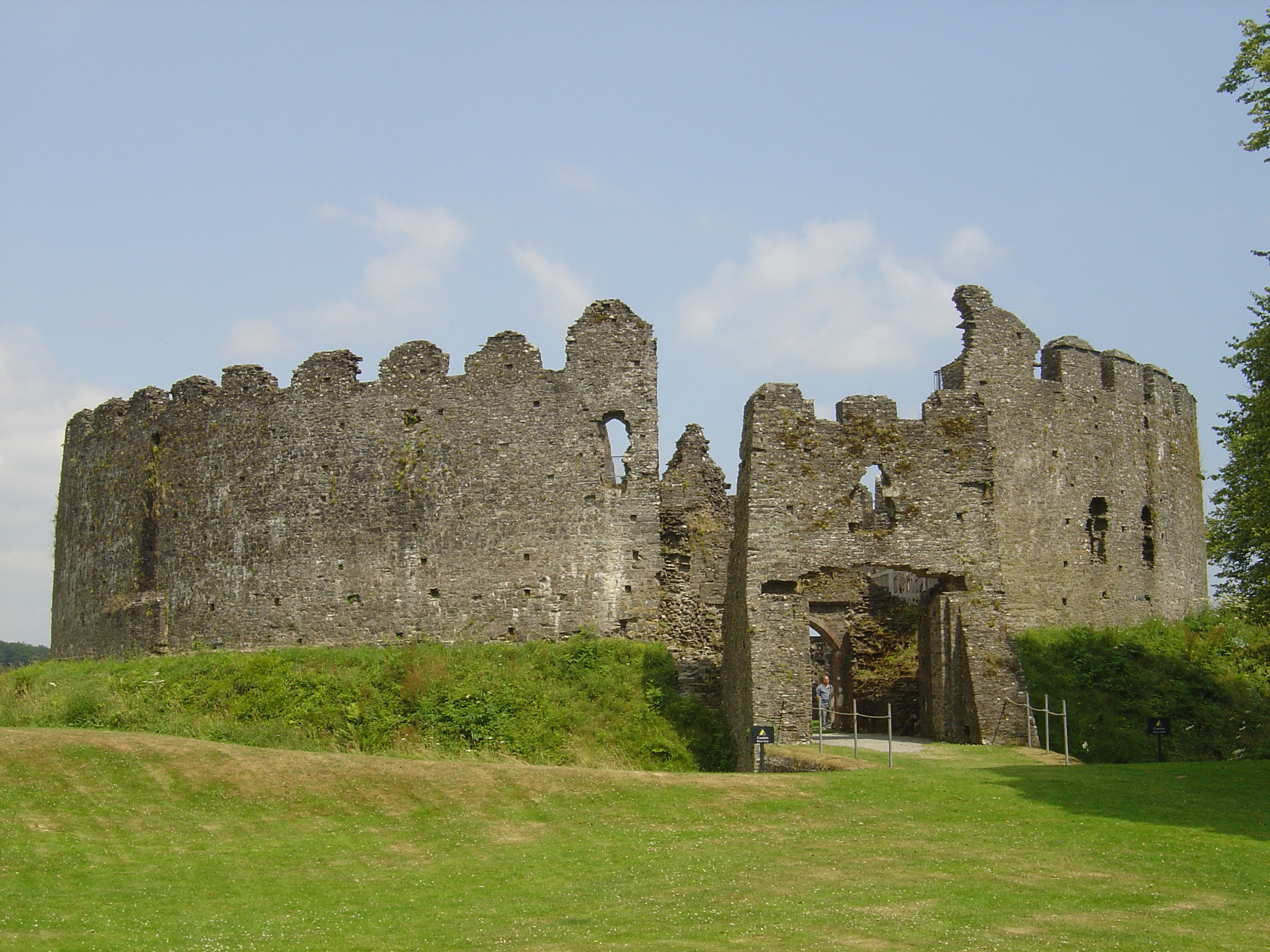
Restormel Castle, looking towards the entrance

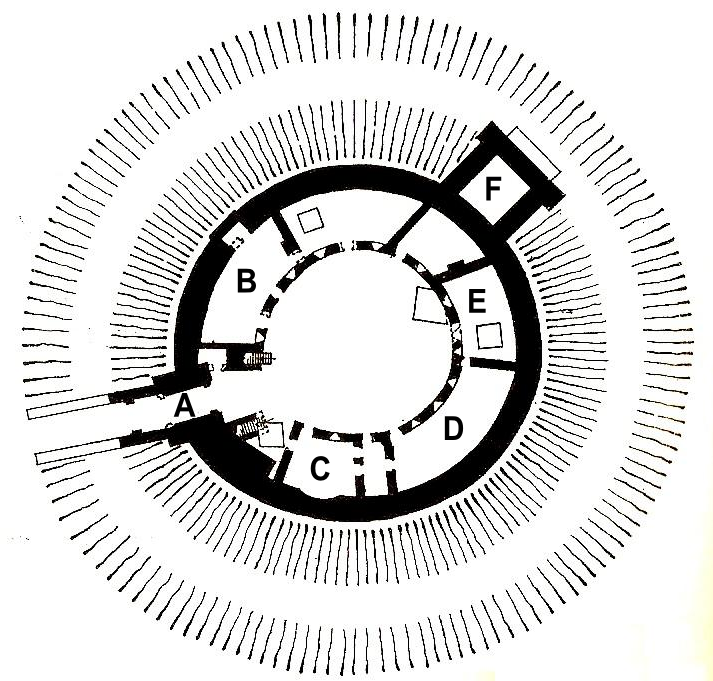
Plan of Restormel Castle

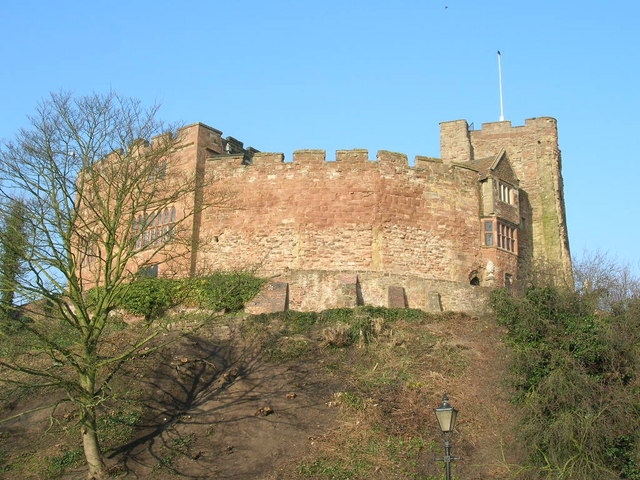
Tamworth Castle, Staffordshire. The right-hand tower is original.

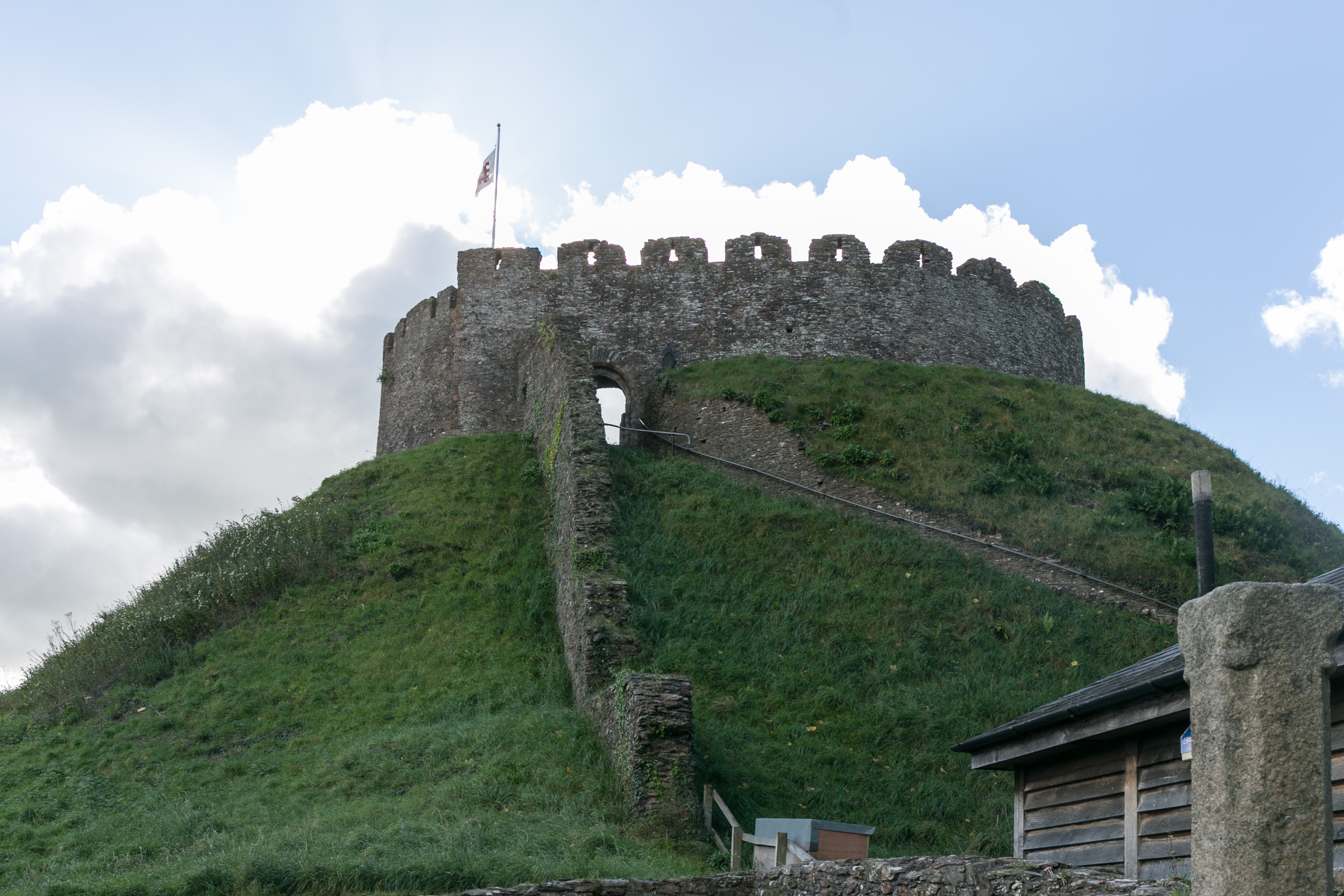
Totnes Castle, Devon

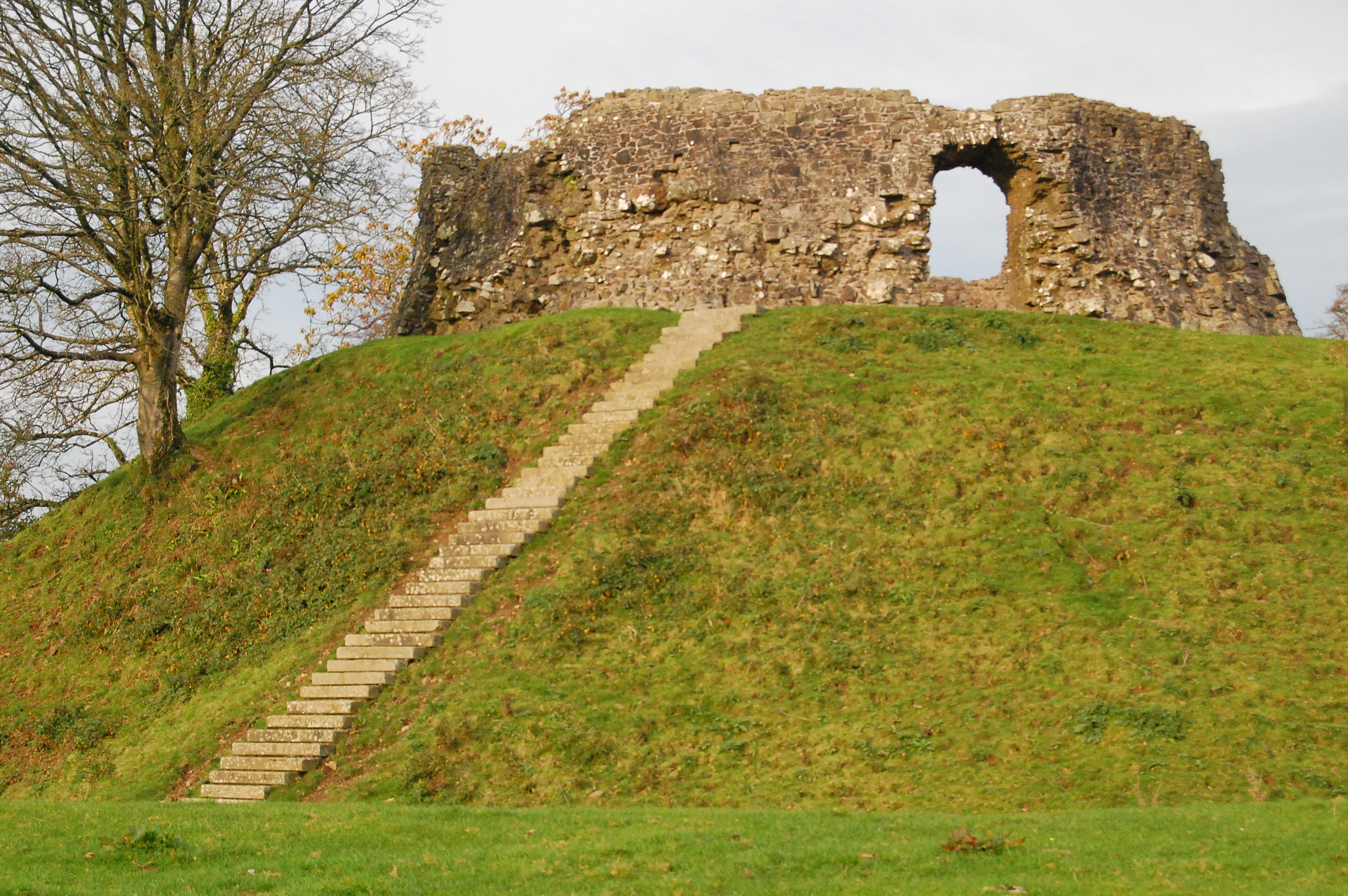
Wiston Castle, Pembrokeshire

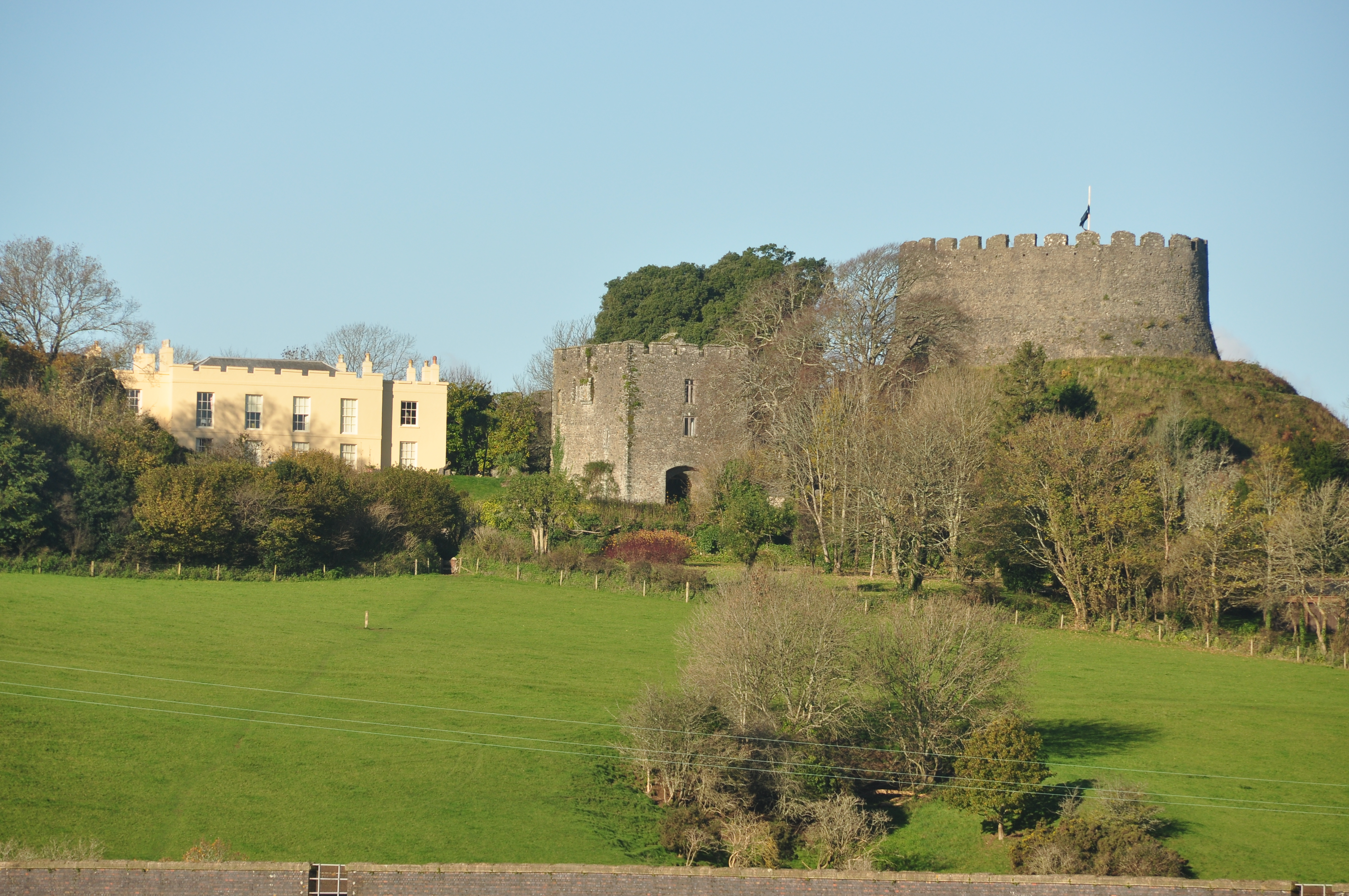
Trematon Castle. The gatehouse to the bailey is in the centre, with a post-medieval house in the bailey to the left

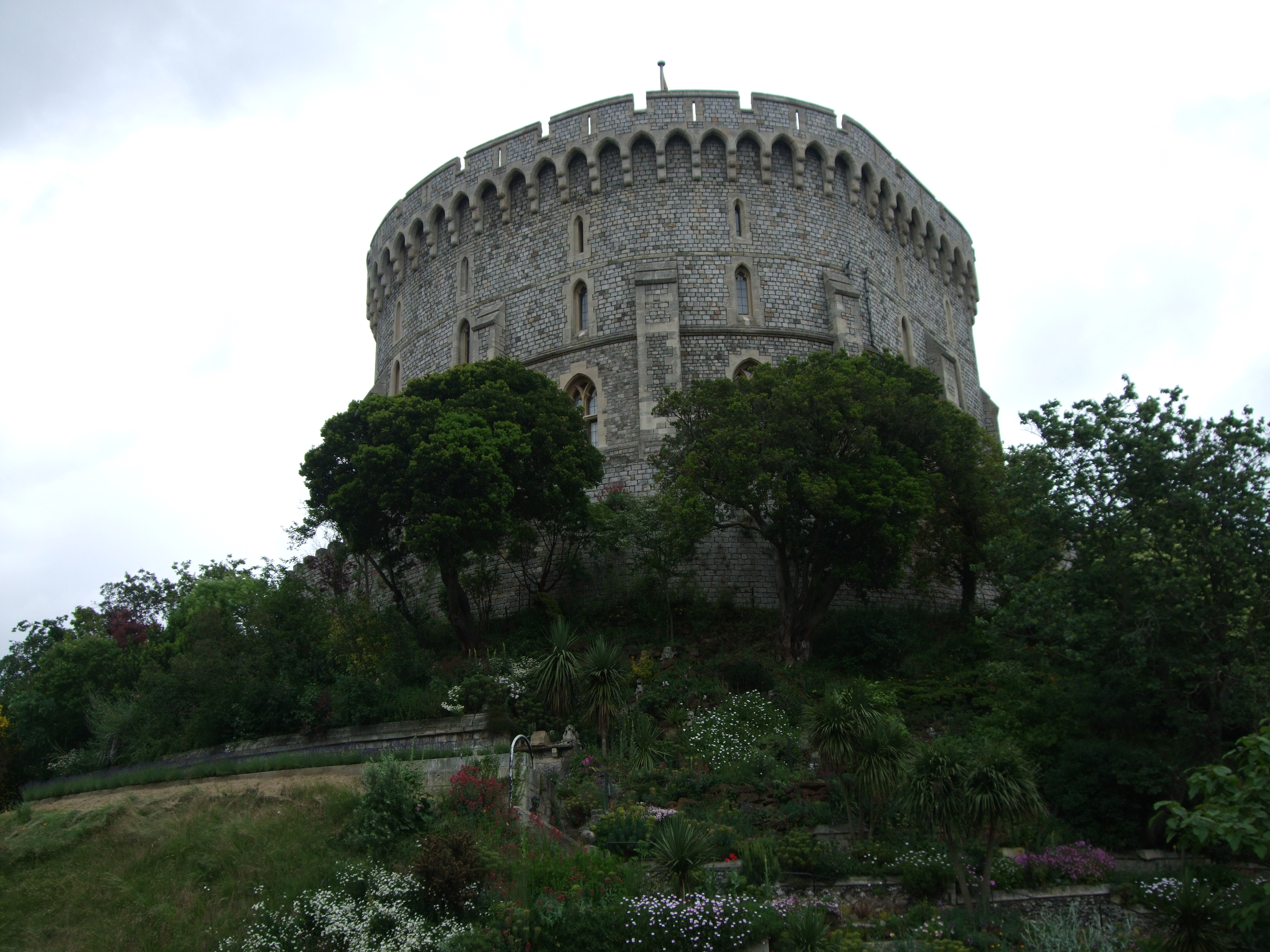
The shell keep of Windsor Castle was built by Henry II and remodelled in the 14th and 19th centuries

== General and cited references ==
- Darvill, Timothy; Stamper, Paul; Timby, Jane (2002). England: an Oxford archaeological guide to sites from earliest times to AD 1600 (illustrated ed.). Oxford University Press. p. 196. ISBN 0-19-284101-7.
- Higham, Robert (2016). "Shell-keeps revisited: the bailey on the motte?" (PDF). Castle Studies Group.
- Hislop, Malcolm (2013). How to read castles. London: Bloomsbury Academic. ISBN 9781472521613.
- Pettifer, Adrian (2002). English Castles: A Guide by Counties (Illustrated ed.). Boydell & Brewer. p. 7. ISBN 0-85115-782-3.
