= Boringdon Camp =

Coordinates: 50.419°N 4.05°W

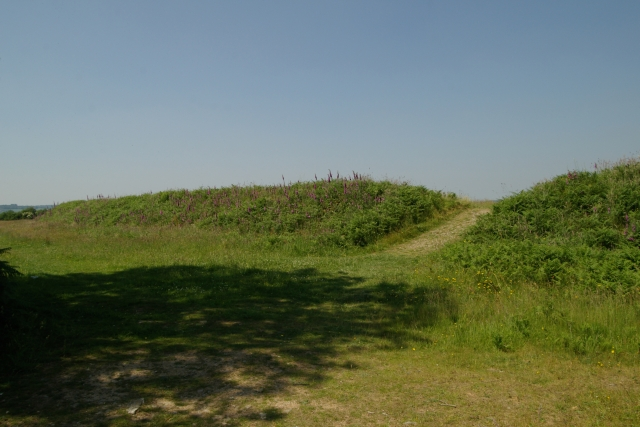
Boringdon Camp

Boringdon Camp is an English Iron Age and Roman earthwork in Cann Woods, near Plympton, Plymouth, Devon. It is a scheduled ancient monument and owned by South Hams District Council.

The site is on a hilltop at 140 metres (460 ft) above sea level, with views down the Plym Valley of Plymouth Sound, 11 kilometres (7 mi) away. The site is located immediately behind the Cann Wood parking at the modern road from Plympton to Shaugh Prior. Since 1st April 2016, the site is closed to visitors, however. The reasons given are the erosion of the earthwork due to visitors walking on it, and conflicts between dogs not kept on lead and grazing sheep (the latter being essential for the conservation of the site).

The fort is constructed around an earlier ring ditch, and covers an area of around 2 hectares (4.9 acres). The remains consist of a sub-circular enclosure surrounded by an 8-metre (26 ft) rampart and a similarly sized outer ditch. This ditch can still be seen in places, though tree planting has covered some of the defences around the main entrance. To the east of the fort is a banked path, the remains of a medieval road from Plympton to Shaugh Prior. The road was abandoned in the early 19th century. The site was listed as a scheduled ancient monument in 1939.

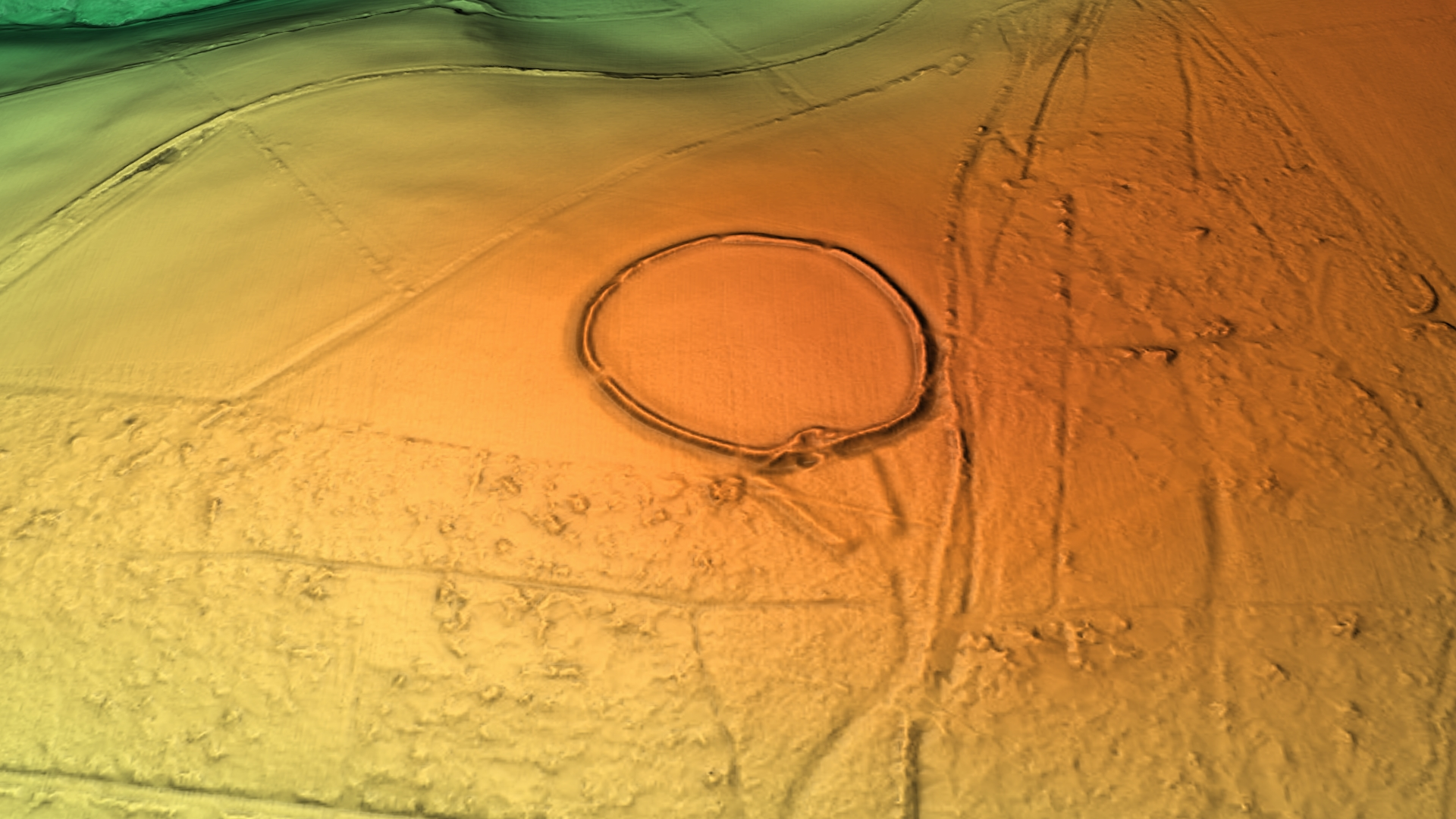
3D view of the digital terrain model

Quarrying in the area has led to disturbance of the site, and part of the area around Boringdon Camp is now a golf course. A former lead mine and its smelt mill are also nearby. The mining remains are also a scheduled monument, as is a deer park which was established in Boringdon Wood in 1699. Traces of another deer park constructed to the east in the early 18th century have also survived.
