= Church of St Maurice, Plympton =

Church of St Maurice
- St Thomas at Plympton St Maurice
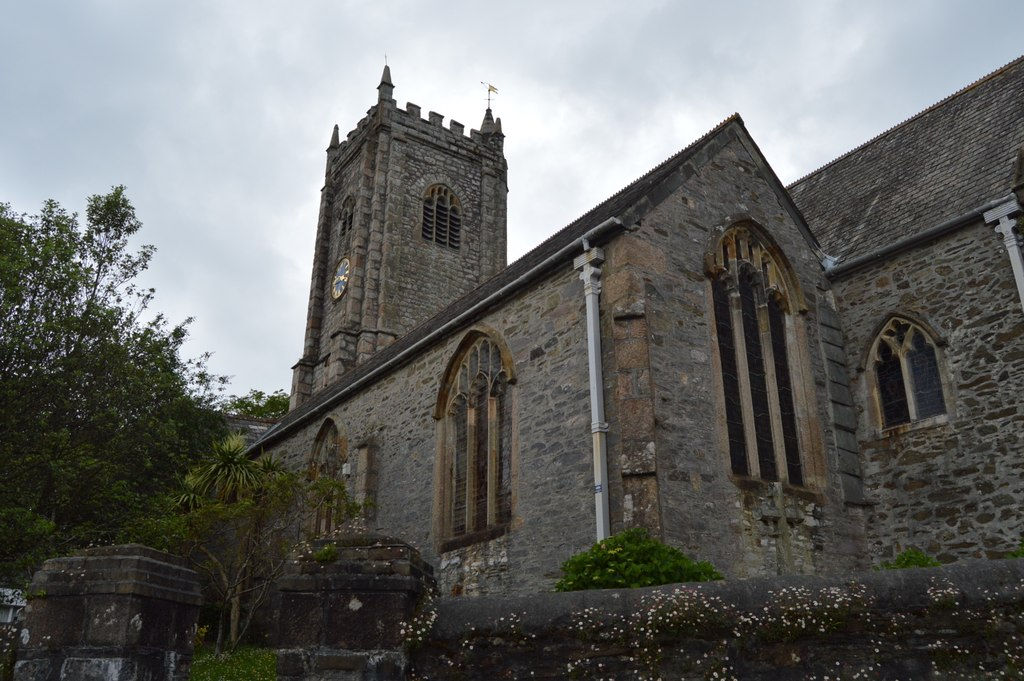
- The church, viewed from the northeast, in 2018
- Church of St Maurice
- 50°23′01″N 4°02′48″W
- OS grid reference: SX 54582 55759
- Location: Church Road, Plympton, Devon
- Country: England
- Denomination: Church of England
- Website: https://www.achurchnearyou.com/church/9180/

Architecture
- Completed: 15th century

Church of St Maurice (also known as the Church of St Thomas at Plympton St Maurice) is located in Plympton, Devon, England. Dating to the 15th century, it is now a Grade II* listed building. The church is of Church of England denomination.

The church tower was rebuilt in 1446 and restored in 1878 by E. H. Sedding. The 1905 nave roof is a copy of the original by Hine and Ogders.

There is a monument to Joshua Reynolds, by James Hine, erected in 1904. It features a portrait medallion by F. Derwent Wood.

The boundary wall and lychgate of the church are Grade II listed.

The church's former rectory stands across the former marketplace at 9 Fore Street. The church hall is located at 10 Market Road in Plympton.
