= Mutley Plain =

Street and area in Plymouth, England

Coordinates: 50.382222°N 4.133889°W

- View of Mutley Plain looking north from the junction with North Hill

- Location within Devon
- Unitary authority: Plymouth
- Ceremonial county: Devon
- Region: South West
- Country: England
- Sovereign state: United Kingdom
- Post town: PLYMOUTH
- Postcode district: PL4 6XX
- Dialling code: 01752
- Police: Devon and Cornwall
- Fire: Devon and Somerset
- Ambulance: South Western
- UK Parliament: Plymouth Sutton and Devonport

Mutley Plain is a street in Plymouth, Devon, England. Although Mutley Plain is the main street of the dense suburb called Mutley, the term is often applied to the whole area. The road is now a busy dual-carriageway, the B3250, with eight sets of traffic lights/pelican crossings. It was built as a smart tree-lined avenue in late Victorian times and improved over the next half century as a local shopping place for its neighbourhood and the affluent area to the north.

== History ==
Mutley Plain lies on the route of an ancient road linking Bilburgh, a Bronze Age settlement on the coast at Sutton Pool which later formed the nucleus of the city of Plymouth, to the north. Mutley was originally the name of two parishes to the west of this road in the valley of the Houndiscombe Brook, the land to the east being part of the parish of Lipson.

Before the Norman invasion in 1066, the parish of Higher Mutley was owned by a man named Alwin of Tamerton, and Lower Mutley by another man called Goodwin, but at the time of the Domesday Book (1086) both were owned by Odo, whose feudal overlord was Juhel of Totnes. In the Domesday Book the two parishes were said to be worth five shillings each. Lower Mutley had two farms while Higher Mutley consisted of ten sheep, one farm and two smallholdings.

=== Railway ===
A tunnel was driven beneath Mutley Plain by the South Devon Railway Company and was opened to traffic on 2 April 1849. Formerly this was the site of Mutley Station, opened 1 August 1871 and known as the 'Station of the Gentry'. It was closed 2 March 1939. The Plymouth-bound platform can still be just made out to the south of Apsley Road. The cutting to the east of the station has been covered over by a car park. Plymouth Railway Station is on the boundary between Mutley Plain and Plymouth City Centre.

== Present day ==
Owing to its proximity to the expanding Plymouth University and the city centre, large numbers of students now live in the area. There are many pubs, bars, restaurants, takeaways and cafes as well as three small supermarkets. There are also more than a dozen barbers and beauty salons along with a good few estate agents. There are secondary schools very close by at Ford Park and at the brow of North Hill.

Mutley Baptist Church is a notable architectural feature. The area is mostly built up except for a small park on Moor View Terrace however Central Park and Ford Park Cemetery are nearby.
