= Guildhall, Plympton =

Municipal building in Plympton, Deven, England

The Guildhall
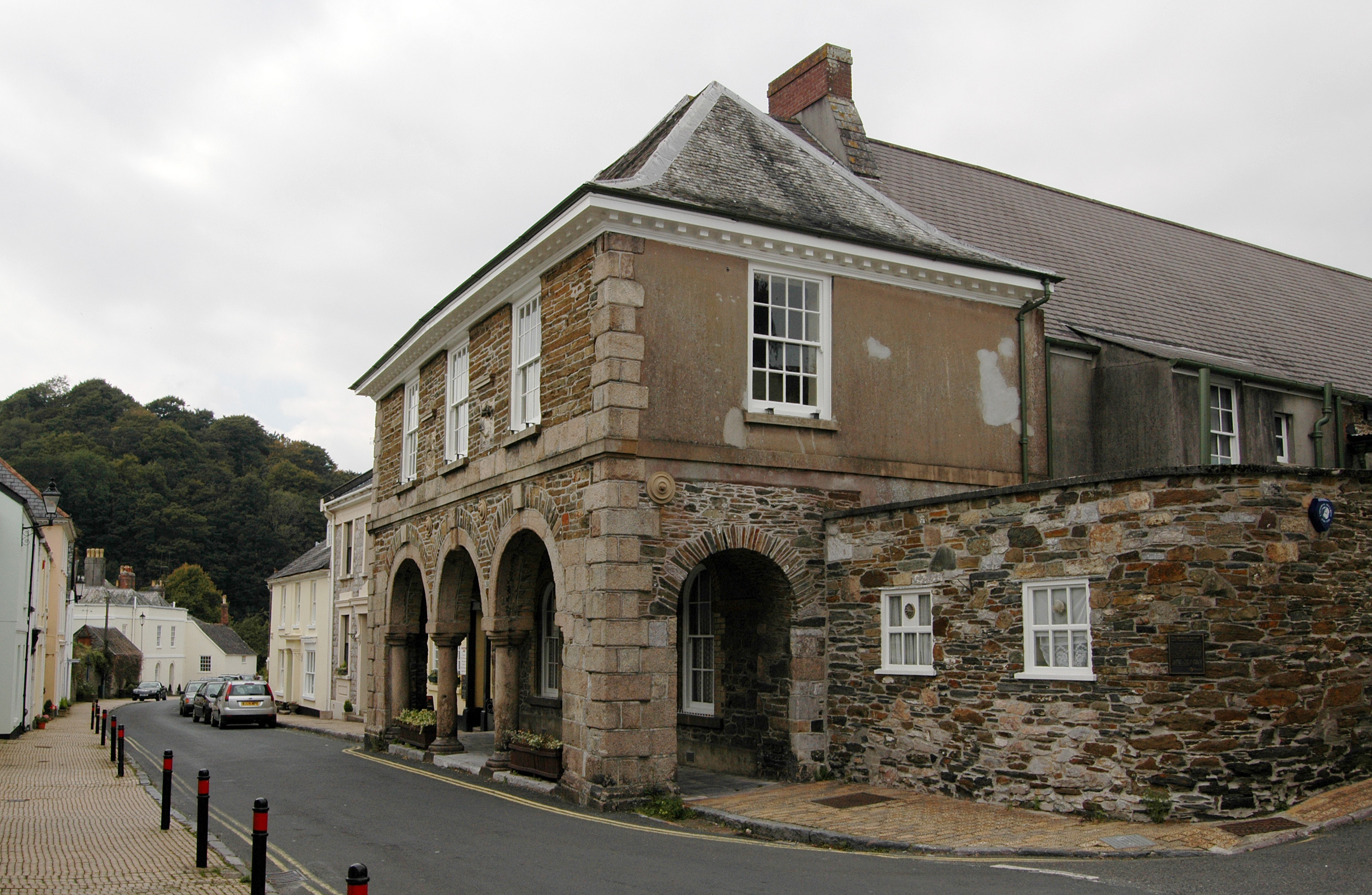
- The Guildhall

- Shown in Devon
- 50.3830°N 4.0494°W
- Location: Fore Street, Plympton

History
- Built: 1688

Site notes
- Architectural style: Neoclassical style

Listed Building – Grade II*
- Official name: The Guildhall
- Designated: 23 April 1952
- Reference no.: 1244435

The Guildhall is a municipal building in Fore Street in Plympton, Devon, England. The structure, which is used as a community events venue, is a Grade II* listed building.

== History ==
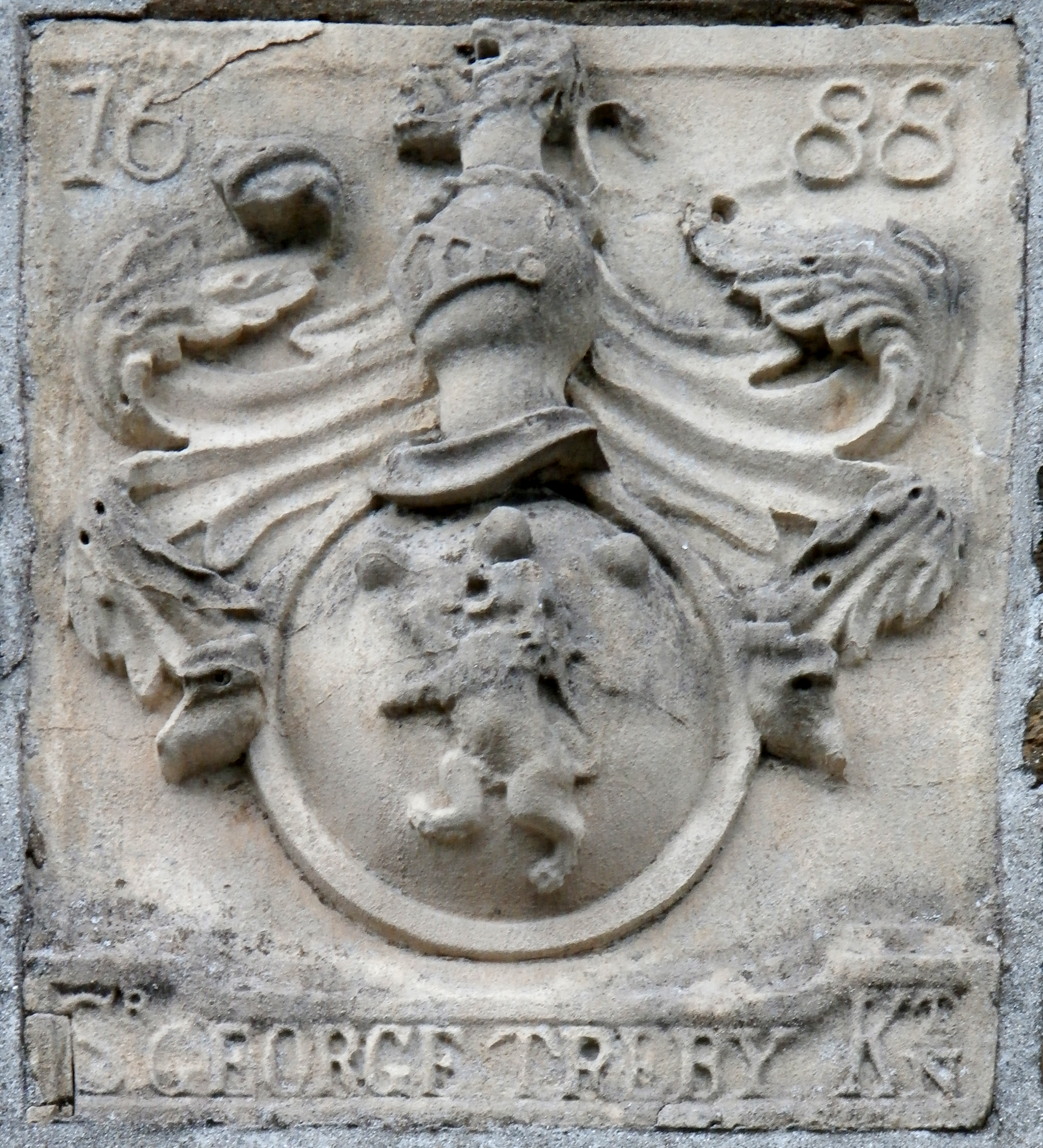
Arms of Sir George Treby with crest: a demi-lion rampant, on the left of the central window (the corresponding arms of Sir Thomas Trevor, on the right of the central window, have largely worn away)

The building was commissioned by Sir George Treby (1643–1700) and Richard Strode (1638–1707), the local members of parliament, to replace an earlier guildhall which dated from the 13th century. It was designed in the neoclassical style, built in rubble masonry with ashlar dressings and was completed in 1688.

The design involved a symmetrical main frontage of three bays facing onto Fore Street. The building was arcaded on the ground floor, so that markets could be held, with an assembly room on the first floor. The openings on the ground floor were formed by Tuscan order columns supporting relieving arches, voussoirs and keystones, while the first floor was fenestrated by three sash windows separated by heraldic panels displaying the coats of arms of Sir George Treby and Sir Thomas Trevor. There were quoins at the corners and there was a modillioned cornice at roof level. Internally, the principal rooms were a lock up, for incarcerating petty criminals, on the ground floor and a courtroom on the first floor.

The painter, Sir Joshua Reynolds, was elected mayor of Plympton in 1773 and presented a self-portrait to the borough, to be hung in the guildhall. Plympton had a very small electorate and two dominant patrons, Paul Treby Treby of Plympton House and Richard Edgcumbe, 2nd Earl of Mount Edgcumbe of Mount Edgcumbe House, which meant it was recognised by the UK Parliament as a rotten borough. Its right to elect members of parliament was removed by the Reform Act 1832. Its borough council, which had met in the courtroom, had fallen into a state of abeyance by 1835, and, having lost its patronage, got into financial difficulties. In order to raise funds, its remaining members sold the self-portrait of Reynolds to George Wyndham, 3rd Earl of Egremont in 1837.

The interior was remodelled in 1862 and the courtroom was replaced by an assembly hall capable of accommodating 300 people. The borough council was formally abolished under the Municipal Corporations Act 1883, and, since then, the building has operated as a community events venue.

Works of art remaining in the guildhall include a portrait by George Beare of Sir George Treby, a portrait by Jonathan Richardson of Alderman George Turbill, and a portrait by Giuseppe Calì of Admiral Sir Alexander Buller.

== See also ==
- Grade II* listed buildings in Plymouth
