= Mutley Baptist Church =

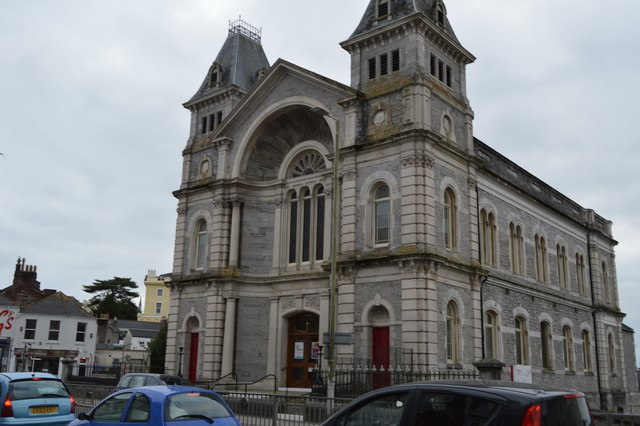
- Mutley Baptist Church
- 50.380972°N 4.133616°W
- OS grid reference: SX 48379 55626
- Location: Mutley Plain Plymouth, Devon
- Country: England
- Denomination: Baptist
- Churchmanship: Evangelical
- Website: www.mutleybaptist.co.uk

History
- Founded: 16 June 1867

Architecture
- Functional status: Active
- Architect: J. Ambrose

Mutley Baptist Church is an evangelical Baptist church and congregation in Mutley Plain, Plymouth, Devon, situated in a large Grade II building, designed by architect J. Ambrose in 1867.

== History ==
=== Early history ===
The Baptist Magazine reported that the church was built at the initiative of the congregation of George Street and that the construction started on 16 June 1867, with the memorial being laid by Mr. Peter Adams, of Plymouth. It also described the style of the building as Venetian-Italian and reported the estimated cost of construction to be around 7000 pounds. The Building News and Engineering Journal reported in 1869 that the construction lasted 16 months and defined the style as Palladian. The church was certified as a place of religious worship on 20 April 1871.

=== Present times ===
In January 2021 the church announced that the Revd Nick Lear was to become the new minister.

== Architecture ==
The church it built of Plymouth limestone in a Classical Style described as French late Gothic /Renaissance or Palladian. It was extended in 1907 to include Spurgeon Hall and is considered a notable example of non-conformist chapel architecture.
