= The Old Rectory, Plympton =

House in Plympton, Devon, England

The Old Rectory
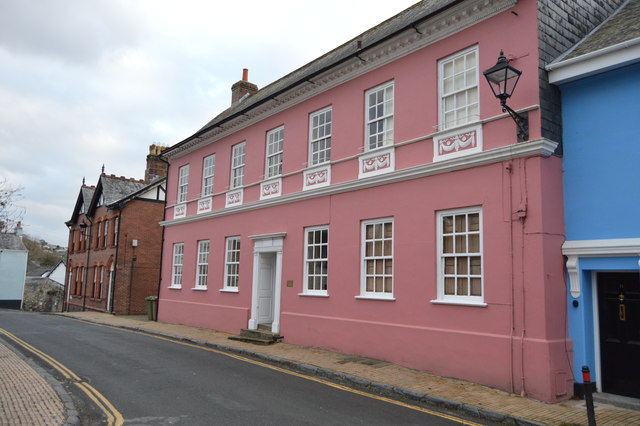
- The Old Rectory in 2016

- Location within Devon
- Interactive map of the The Old Rectory area

General information
- Architectural style: Georgian
- Location: 9 Fore Street, Plympton, England
- Coordinates: 50.3829°N 4.0473°W

Technical details
- Floor count: 3 (including basement)

The Old Rectory is a grade II* listed townhouse in Plympton, Devon, England. It was listed on 23 April 1952.

The building was formerly the rectory for the Church of St Maurice across the former marketplace immediately to the north.

== Exterior ==
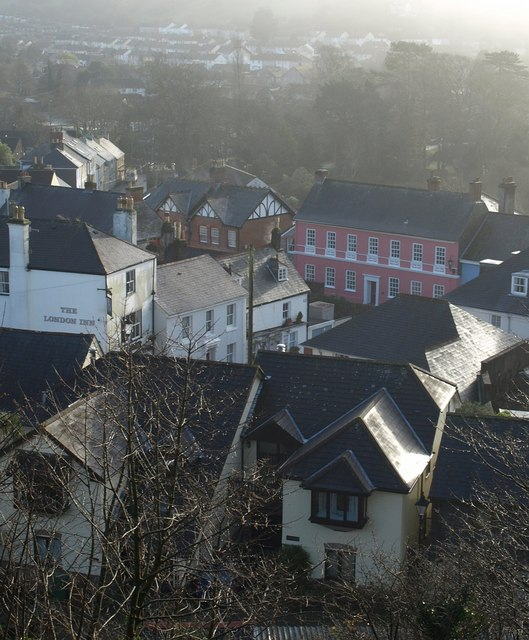
View from the castle

As revealed when the British archaeology television programme Time Team visited Plympton in 1998, today's building was installed around the earlier shell, leaving a one-foot gap between the two frontages. When the rebuild happened, around the turn of the 17th century, the road was raised to provide a grand entrance to the new front door and, in so doing, created a basement from the formerly ground-level main floor of the medieval house.

The main façade has seven sash windows on the first floor and six on the ground floor, with the door in the middle. All of the windows are original to the reconstructed house. Below each first-floor window are friezes. The door is set back about two feet into the façade, atop three stone steps.

As of 2017, the building was painted salmon pink, with its trim painted white. It was previously painted cream, with white trim.
