= The Ship, Derriford =

Office building in Plymouth, England

Coordinates: 50°24′50″N 4°07′08″W

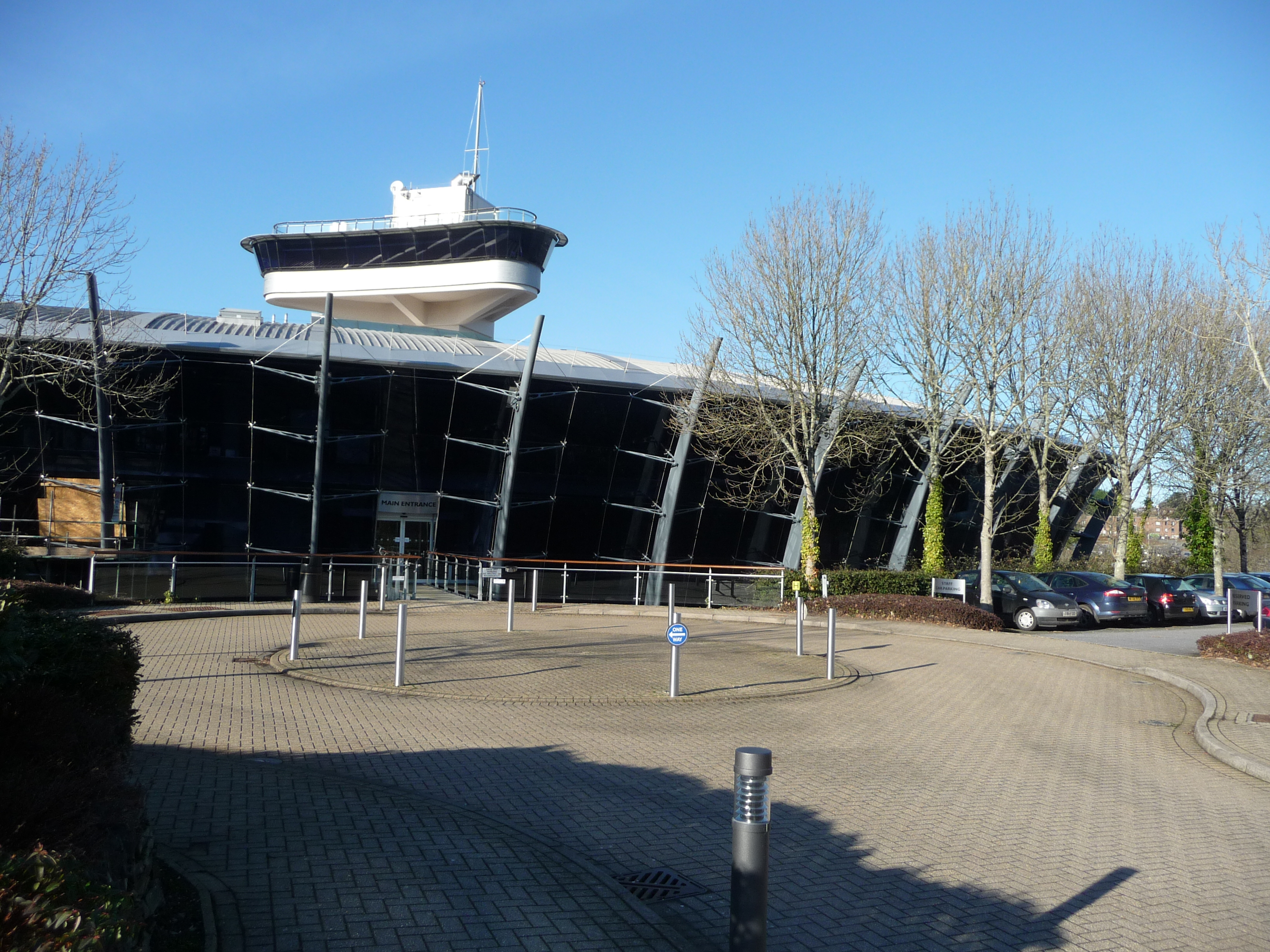
Western Morning News Building, Derriford, Plymouth

The Ship is an office building in Derriford, Plymouth, England. It was designed by Nicholas Grimshaw and is constructed of glass and steel in the form of a ship. It was the offices of The Herald and Western Morning News for many years until their move to Millbay in 2013.

It was recommended for listing at Grade II* by Historic England in April 2015.

The building has been in use as Adrenaline trampoline fun park and a Clip ‘n Climb activity centre since 2017.

== History ==
The Ship was built in 1992-3 as the headquarters for The Evening Herald and the Western Morning News in the Derriford area of Plymouth, Devon. The architect was Sir Nicholas Grimshaw CBE. The building was vacated by the newspapers in 2013, after a change of ownership in 2012 from Daily Mail and General Trust plc to Local World which resulted in relocation to smaller offices at Milbay in Plymouth, and the building has since stood empty.

The owners advertised the building for sale, but, as of 10 April 2015, no buyers had come forward, and the owners served Plymouth City Council with a notice that they wish to demolish the building, leading the Twentieth Century Society to place it on its Risk List. Sir Nicholas Grimshaw made his own suggestions as to what use could be made of the building now that it is redundant as a newspaper headquarters and printing press. On 22 July 2015 it was announced that the building had been awarded a Grade II* listing by Historic England saving it from demolition.

== Awards ==
- British Constructional Steelwork Association Structural Steel Design Award 1993
- Royal Fine Art Building of the Year Awards 1993
- British Construction Industry Awards 1993
- The Royal Institute of British Architects Award 1994.

== Gallery ==
The Grimshaw partnership website has a selection of photographs of the Western Morning News HQ, known locally as "The Ship", since the WMN vacated the building in 2013.
