= Plympton Priory =

Former priory in Devon, England

Coordinates: 50.387169°N 4.058161°W

Plympton Priory was a priory in Devon, England. Its history is recorded in the Annales Plymptonienses.

== History ==
The site of an Anglo-Saxon minster, Plympton Priory was re-founded as an Augustinian house by Bishop William Warelwast in 1121. The foundation was confirmed by King Henry I sometime around then. Warelwast was apparently scandalised by the loose living of the existing canons of Plympton, and he closed the house, sending them to a new house in Bosham, West Sussex. He then re-founded Plympton, with brethren from Holy Trinity Priory and Merton Priory.

The Priory supplied various local clergy (not always without controversy), and continued to be an important local establishment until its dissolution in 1539. It was the richest monastic house in Devon, and the fourth wealthiest Augustinian house in England and Wales. The Valor Ecclesiasticus gave its value as £898 0s 8 1/8d.
