= Edward Courtenay, 1st Earl of Devon =

English nobleman (c. 1527–1556)

Edward Courtenay, Earl of Devon
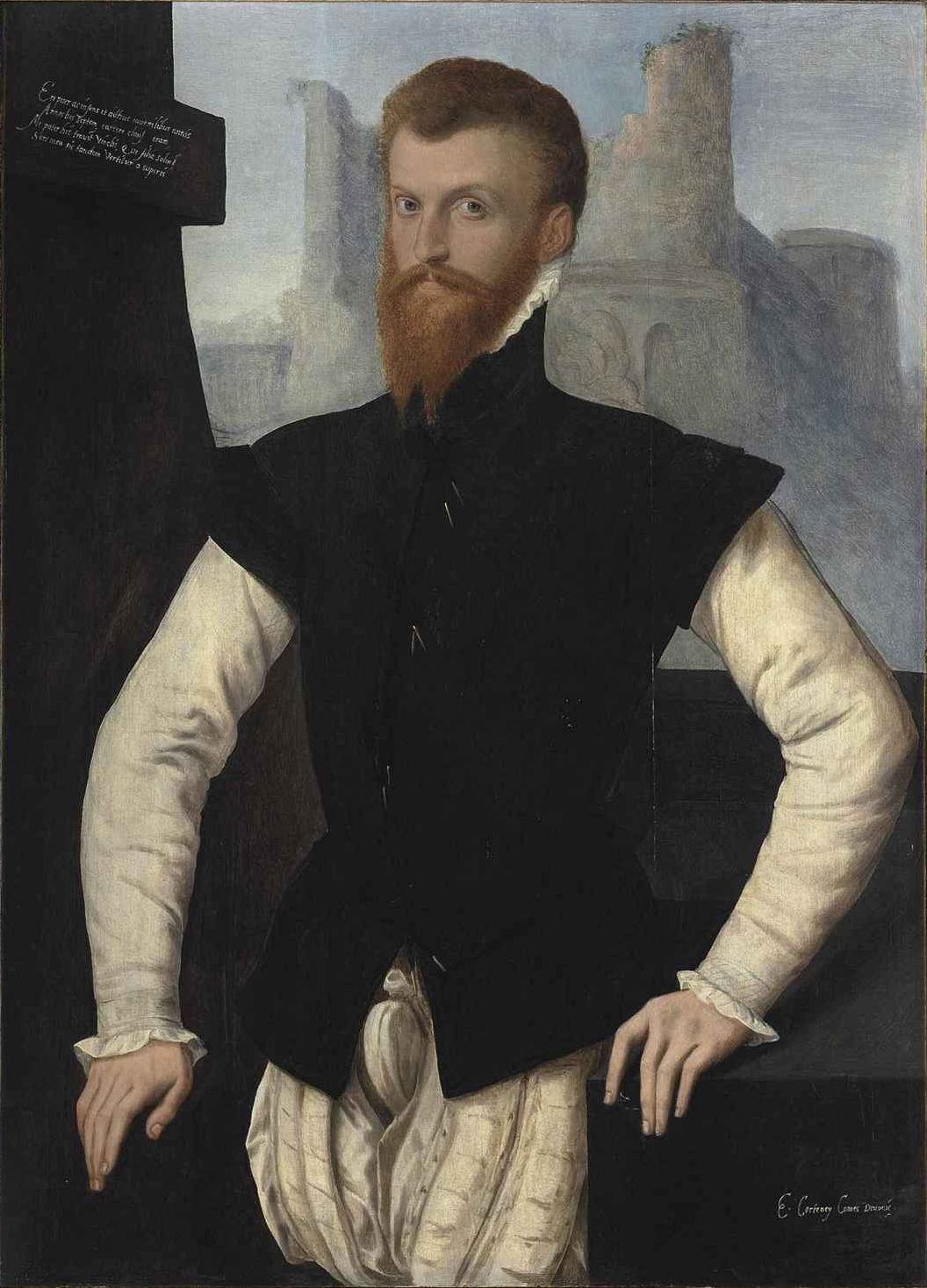
- Edward Courtney, Earl of Devon, unknown artist, English School, c. 1555

Personal details
- Born: 1526; Okehampton, Devon, England
- Died: 9 September 1556 (aged 29) Padua, Republic of Venice
- Spouse: Laurana de' Medici (Rumored)
- Parent(s): Henry Courtenay, 1st Marquess of Exeter; Gertrude Blount
- Religion: Roman Catholicism

Arms of Courtenay (undifferenced): Or, three torteaux. It appears that by the early 1500s the Earls of Devon had stopped using a label azure of three points to difference their arms, as is apparent from surviving heraldry in Tiverton Church and on the Speke Chantry in Exeter Cathedral

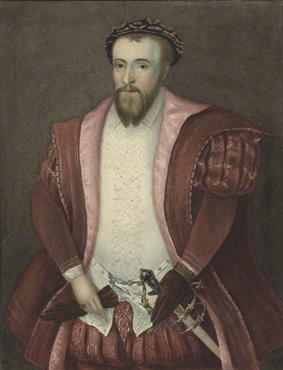
Edward Courtenay, 1st Earl of Devon (1527–1556), 1813 copy by unknown artist of original by unknown artist c.1556, watercolour, National Portrait Gallery, London, NPG D24893

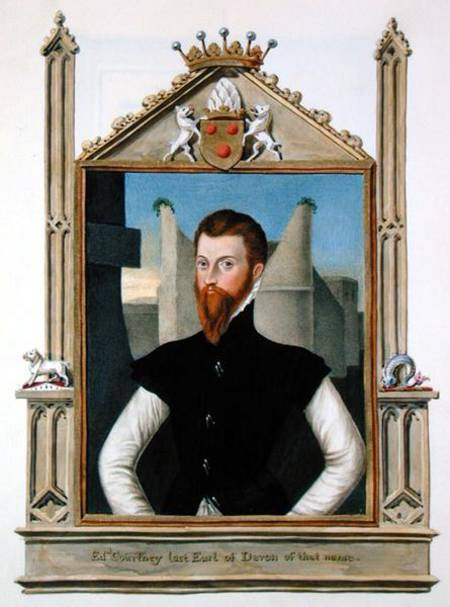
19th-century copy by Sarah Bazett (d.1838) of portrait of Edward Courtenay, 1st Earl of Devon (d.1556) by Steven van der Meulen (d.1564). The Courtenay arms are shown above: Or, 3 torteaux; the escutcheon is surmounted with the Courtenay crest of feathers. On the gothic frame are shown two small figures of the Courtenay supporters, a boar and dolphin

Edward Courtenay, 1st Earl of Devon (c. 1527 – 18 September 1556) was an English nobleman during the rule of the Tudor dynasty. Born into a family with close royal connections, he was imprisoned for the majority of his adolescence and early adulthood. He was at various times considered a possible match for the two daughters of Henry VIII, both of whom became queens regnant of England. He was the great-grandson of Edward IV, and thus a second cousin to King Edward VI, and Queens Mary I and Elizabeth I.

== Origins ==
He was the only son of Henry Courtenay, 1st Marquess of Exeter (c.1498–1539) by his second wife, Gertrude Blount, daughter of William Blount, 4th Baron Mountjoy. Edward's paternal grandmother was Princess Catherine of York (1479–1527), a daughter of King Edward IV and thus a sister to King Edward V, a niece to King Richard III, and a sister of Elizabeth of York who was the wife of King Henry VII and the mother of King Henry VIII. Edward Courtenay was thus a first cousin once removed of King Henry VIII and of Queen Margaret of Scotland, and a second cousin to Queen Mary I, Queen Elizabeth I, King Edward VI, King James V of Scotland, and Henry Brandon, 1st Earl of Lincoln.

== Career ==
The first decade of Edward's life was relatively peaceful. His early years were spent in the household of Mary Tudor, duchess of Suffolk and dowager queen of France, but following her death in 1533, he returned to his own family; he got private tutoring from Robert Taylor of Oxford. While Exeter was a close companion of Henry VIII in the 1520s, he came under greater suspicion during the annulment crisis due to his wife's continued backing for Catherine of Aragon and his connection with dissatisfied Poles and Nevilles. In view of his son's future goals, it's worth noting that the marquess was accused of intending to marry his son to Princess Mary. His father was a prominent figure at the royal court and his mother enjoyed the friendship of Queen Catherine of Aragon even after the annulment of her marriage to King Henry VIII.

== Imprisonment ==
In early November 1538, Edward Courtenay and his parents were arrested and incarcerated in the Tower of London. His father was accused of conspiring with the self-exiled Cardinal Reginald Pole to lead a Roman Catholic uprising in the so-called Exeter conspiracy and was executed on 9 January 1539. Both Edward and his mother were attainted and unable to inherit his titles and lands.

His mother was released from prison in 1540 and for the rest of her life maintained a friendship with Mary Tudor, eldest daughter of Henry VIII and future queen. However, as a great-grandson of King Edward IV and a possible heir of the House of York, Edward was considered too much of a threat to the rule of the House of Tudor to be released.

In 1547, Henry VIII died and was succeeded by his only surviving legitimate son, Edward VI. The new King declared a general amnesty, but his incarcerated cousin Edward Courtenay was among the few exceptions.

While still incarcerated, Edward translated Benefizio di Cristo ("The Benefit of Christ's Death") into the English language and dedicated the manuscript to Anne Stanhope, wife of the Lord Protector Edward Seymour, 1st Duke of Somerset, uncle of King Edward VI. The Cambridge University Library contains a copy autographed by Edward VI himself. Courtenay may have intended this work as a gift of reconciliation to his royal cousin. Whatever benefits the translation may have brought him, release from the Tower of London was not among them.

King Edward VI died on 6 July 1553. His designated heir, Lady Jane Grey, ascended briefly to the throne, but Mary Tudor, the king's elder half-sister, fortified at Framlingham Castle, was declared queen instead by the Privy Council on 19 July. Gertrude Blount was still her close friend and secured the release of her son Edward on 3 August 1553, after 15 years of incarceration in the Tower.

== Life after release ==
Courtenay soon became a favourite of his royal cousin Queen Mary, who greatly benefited the young man. Mary created him Earl of Devon on 3 September 1553 and Knight of the Bath on 29 September 1553. On 1 October 1553, Mary was crowned, and the new Earl of Devon carried the Sword of State in the coronation ceremony. On 10 October 1553, Edward was acknowledged as the proper heir to the lands and titles of his father, but was not allowed to succeed him as Marquess of Exeter.

On 2 January 1554, the new ambassadors of Charles V, Holy Roman Emperor arrived in England, and the new Earl of Devon was assigned to receive them. He also served as a special commissioner at the trial of Robert Dudley, Jane Grey's brother-in-law.

Mary showed her young cousin considerable affection. Courtenay considered he might be the Queen's future husband, and Bishop Stephen Gardiner reportedly encouraged Devon to consider himself a likely suitor for her. Spanish ambassadors reported that there was "much talk here to the effect that he will be married to the Queen, as he is of the blood royal". His household was organised as a minor court, and several courtiers already knelt before him. However, despite the fact that Courtenay was also a Roman Catholic, Mary eventually rejected him in order to marry Prince Philip of Habsburg, the future King Philip II of Spain.

Courtenay still entertained hopes for the throne and turned his attentions to Mary's younger half-sister, Elizabeth. As Mary was childless, Elizabeth was the heir presumptive to the throne. Mary and Philip's marriage was extremely unpopular with the English. Some prominent persons, including William Paget, 1st Baron Paget, advocated their replacement on the throne by Elizabeth and the Earl of Devon. But then came Wyatt's rebellion in late January 1554. Thomas Wyatt the Younger was among those Protestants who feared Catholic persecution under Mary and Philip. He rose in rebellion to prevent this marriage and declared his intentions to place Mary under his charge. The rebellion was short-lived and was crushed by early March 1554. There were rumours that Courtenay had negotiated with Wyatt and was preparing similar revolts in Devonshire and Cornwall.

Courtenay and Elizabeth were implicated as being responsible for the rebellion, and were both incarcerated at the Tower of London while awaiting trial. In May 1554, Elizabeth was sent to Woodstock Palace and Courtenay was moved to Fotheringhay Castle On Holy Saturday, Simon Renard, the Spanish ambassador to England, advised Queen Mary that the continued survival of the two "great persons" posed a threat to both her and her consort Philip. He informed the Queen that he would not recommend the arrival of Philip in England until every necessary step had been taken to secure his safety, and until Courtenay and Elizabeth were put on trial. Renard had therefore effectively informed her that Philip would not set foot on English ground until both prisoners were executed or otherwise rendered harmless.

Mary agreed to hasten the trials, but the collection of evidence had not been completed. There were many rumours implicating Courtenay and Elizabeth with the failed rebellion but no solid evidence that either of them took part in organising it. Neither of them ever marched with the rebels, and both were non-combatants for its duration. Mary and Philip were married on 25 July 1554.

No conviction could be secured for the prisoners. Elizabeth was at first placed under house arrest in the care of Sir Henry Bedingfield. She was released and allowed to return to court by the end of the year. At Easter, 1555, Courtenay was also released; he was exiled to Continental Europe. He was next heard of in November 1555, when he wrote a letter from Brussels pleading for permission to return to England to pay his respects to Queen Mary and to his mother. The two women were still close friends, but Courtenay had lost his former protector's trust, and his request was denied.

He was still the Earl of Devon and retained his rights and property, but not the right to set foot in England. Both Mary and Elizabeth refused to have any further association with him. Elizabeth considered him partly responsible for her incarceration and reportedly despised any mention of him. Thus, Courtenay had lost any chance of marrying either one of the two royal women.

== Exile in Venice ==
Courtenay left England in 1555 for exile in the Republic of Venice, where he became the focus of the several English Protestant "Marian exiles" who had opposed Mary's accession. Many of them had been supporters of Wyatt's and of Northumberland's plots to crown Lady Jane Grey. The Venetians too, although Catholic, were opposed to Mary's marriage with the Spanish prince, whose expanding European Empire threatened Venice's trade. The exiles' plan, namely to arrange a marriage between Courtenay and Elizabeth and to place both on the throne as secure Protestants, was cut short by Courtenay's sudden death in 1556 at Padua, then a member of the Venetian Republic. His place as the focus for the English malcontents in Venice was taken by Francis Russell, 2nd Earl of Bedford.

== Death ==
The exact circumstances of Courtenay's death are not known. Peter Vannes, Queen Mary's ambassador to the Republic of Venice, wrote her a report, but he was not a direct witness or a physician.

According to his account, Courtenay was engaged in falconry for recreational reasons. He and his falcons were in the countryside and away from any building when caught in a violent storm. He failed to protect himself from the elements and refused to change his wet clothing even after returning home. Several days later, Courtenay had a burning fever, which lasted to his final hours. He was reportedly unable to open his mouth even to receive the Eucharist. (Fever and trismus are symptoms of tetanus). He was buried in the Basilica of Saint Anthony of Padua, where a monument to him with verse was erected.

It was reported that Vannes suspected poison. Later theorists suggested that he had died of syphilis, but both suggestions remain unconfirmed. Another account has Courtenay on a gondola ride to the Isle of Lio, when a storm stranded him there and forced him to wait it out, all the while becoming soaked and suffering from exposure, until a ship rescued him. Three days later he was supposedly suffering from malaria, yet insisted on travelling to Padua and, there, was treated by medical doctors of the university. Upon leaving his lodgings in Padua, he fell down a flight of stairs and his journey home was made all the more uncomfortable. As reported by Vannes, over the next two weeks Courtenay's condition worsened and he died on 18 September 1556.

== Monument at Padua ==
He was buried in a temporary tomb in the Basilica of Saint Anthony of Padua in Padua, and in the Chapel of the Crucifix of that building survived in 1869 the inscription: ODOARDO COURTENAI 1556. His remains were removed from the Basilica at some unknown date to a location unknown. However an elaborate epitaph in Latin verse "in print only and not in marble" was written by Bernardo Giorgio, Podestà of Padua, who shared the suspicion that he had been poisoned, and was published in 1560 by Bernardo Scardeoni, a Canon of Padua. The epitaph was repeated by Camden (d. 1623) in his Remains Concerning Britain, "more for his (i.e. the Earl's) honour than the elegancy of the verse" and by other authors including Prince in his Worthies of Devon. It was deemed by Lodge (1823) to "afford from a somewhat singular source a corroboration of some of the most important circumstances of a story involved in much uncertainty and frequently disfigured by wilful misrepresentation".

Anglia quem genuit fueratque habitura patronum,
CORTONEUM celsa haec continet arca ducem.
Credita causa necis regni affectata cupido,
Reginae optatum tunc quoque connubium.
Cui regni proceres non-consensere Philippo
Reginam regi jungere posse rati.
Europam unde fuit juveni peragrare necesse,
Ex quo mors misero contigit ante diem.
Anglia si plorat defuncto principe tanto,
Nil mirum domino deficit illa pio.
Sed jam CORTONEUM caelo fruiturque beatis,
Cum doleant Angli cum sine fine gemant.
Cortonei probitas igitur praestantia nomen,
Dum stabit hoc templum vivida semper erunt;
Angliaque hinc etiam stabit stabuntque Britanni,
Conjugii optati fama perennis erit.
Improba Naturae leges Libitina rescindens,
Ex aequo juvenes praecipitatque senes".

Which was partly translated as follows by Horace Walpole in his Reminiscences (1788):

"This high chest contains the duke of Courtenay, born in England, of which country he had a prospect of becoming the master. The supposed cause of his death was his ambition to seize the throne, by marrying the queen; but the peers would not consent, preferring Philip, a royal husband. Hence it became necessary for the youth to travel through Europe; and, in consequence, he perished by a premature death. It is not surprising that England should lament the fate of such a prince, and droop as for the death of her pious lord. But Courtenay now enjoys the happy society of Heaven, while the English lament and groan without end... etc."

The last 6 lines untranslated by him may be continued thus:

"While the name of Courtenay stands in this temple probity and excellence will always be animated. And England stands and the British will stand ... shall be lasting of the desired union ... the fame will be lasting. Wicked Libitina (goddess of corpses) repealing the laws of Nature, casts down likewise the young and old"

== Succession ==
He was unmarried and childless at the time of his death. The manor and Castle of Tiverton and his other numerous estates devolved to his distant cousins, descended from the four sisters of his great-grandfather Edward Courtenay, 1st Earl of Devon (d.1509), all children of Sir Hugh Courtenay (d.1471) of Boconnoc in Cornwall and his wife, Margaret Carminow. These four sisters were as follows:

- Elizabeth Courtenay, wife of John Trethurffe of Trethurffe in the parish of Ladock, Cornwall.
- Maud Courtenay, wife of John Arundell of Talvern
- Isabel/Elizabeth Courtenay, wife of William Mohun of Hall in the parish of Lanteglos-by-Fowey in Cornwall, a descendant of John Mohun (d.1322) of Dunster Castle in Somerset, feudal baron of Dunster by his wife Anne Tiptoft. In 1628 her descendant John Mohun (1595–1641) was created by King Charles I Baron Mohun of Okehampton, his ancestor having inherited as his share Okehampton Castle and remnants of the feudal barony of Okehampton, one of the earliest possessions of the Courtenays. The Mohuns' held the manor of Boconnoc not (as might be expected) as a share of the Courtenay inheritance, but by lease from the Russell Earl of Bedford.
- Florence Courtenay, wife of John Trelawny

Thus the Courtenay estates were divided into four parts. On the death of Edward Courtenay, Earl of Devon, in 1556, the actual heirs to his estates were the following descendants of the four sisters above:

- Reginald Mohun (1507/8-67) of Hall in the parish of Lanteglos-by-Fowey in Cornwall, who inherited Okehampton Castle and Boconnoc. His descendant was John Mohun, 1st Baron Mohun of Okehampton (1595–1641) who was elevated to the peerage by King Charles I as Baron Mohun of Okehampton, in recognition of his ancestor having inherited Okehampton Castle as his share of the Courtenay inheritance.
- Margaret Buller;
- John Vivian;
- John Trelawny;

=== The Courtenay Faggot ===
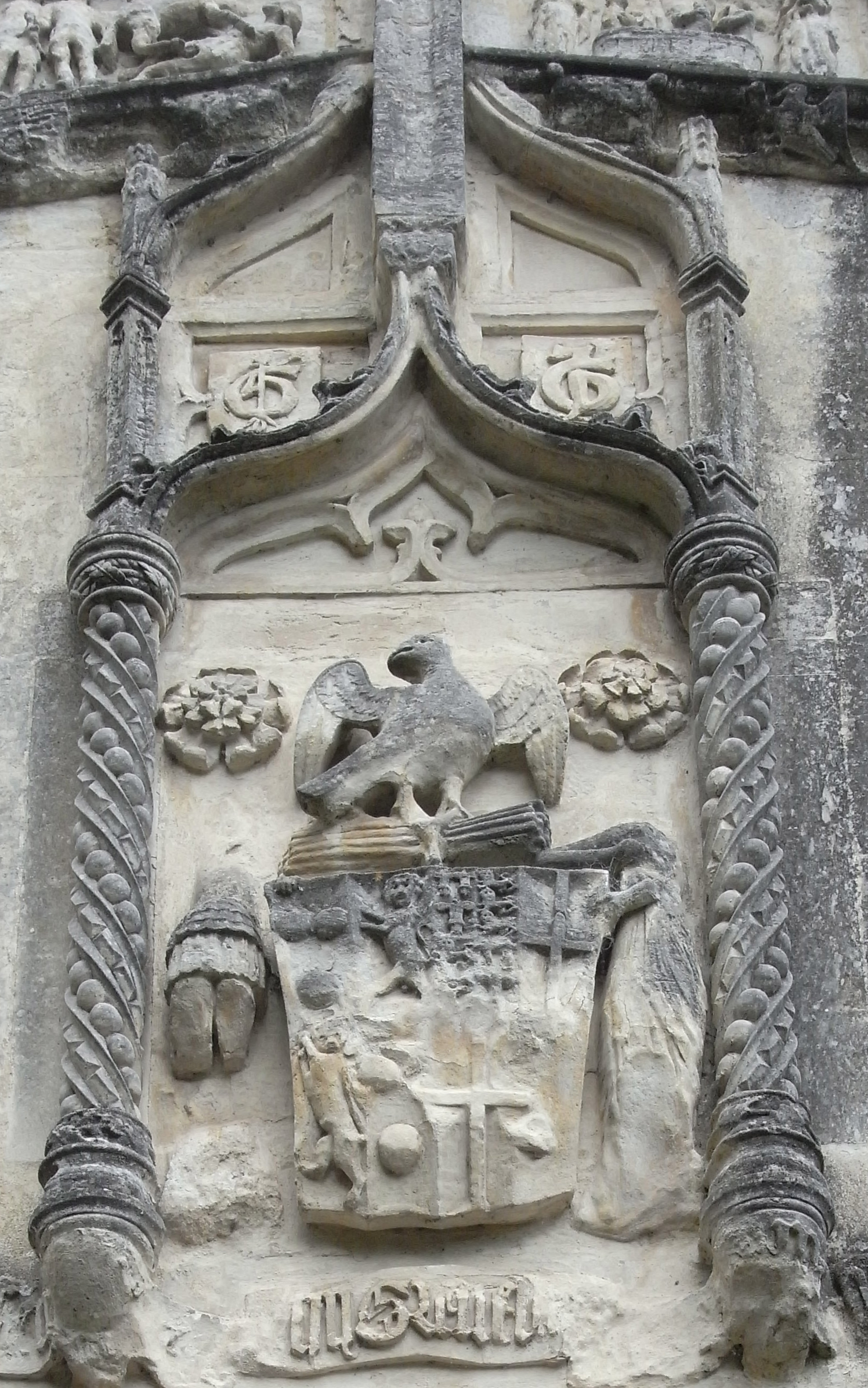
Arms of William Courtenay, 10th Earl of Devon (d.1511), of Tiverton Castle, above the south porch of St Peter's Church, Tiverton, next to the Castle. Part of the Greenway Chapel, built in 1517 by the wealthy Tiverton merchant John Greenway (d.1529), whose initials are seen above the Courtenay arms. Above and between two White Roses of York appears the very rarely seen heraldic badge of the Courtenays: A falcon rising holding in its claws a bundle of sticks. This is possibly a reference to the "Courtenay Faggot" described by Richard Carew (d.1620) in his Survey of Cornwall. The imagery is however reminiscent of the "Eagle of Jupiter" holding in his claws a thunderbolt, the emblem of that deity, as commonly seen on ancient Greek and Roman coins

The Courtenay Faggot was a mysterious naturally misshapen piece of wood split at the ends into four sticks, one of which again split into two, supposedly kept as a valued possession by the Courtenay Earls of Devon. It was later interpreted as an omen of the end of the line of Courtenay Earls of Devon via four heiresses. It was seen by the Cornish historian Richard Carew (d.1620) when visiting Hall, then the dower house of Margaret Reskimer, the widow of Sir William Mohun (d.1588), MP, of Hall, the great-grandson of Elizabeth Courtenay, who described it in his Survey of Cornwall as follows:

"A farre truer foretoken touching the Earle of Devon's progeny I have seen at this place of Hall, to wit, a kind of faggot, whose age and painting approveth the credited tradition that it was carefully preserved by those noble men. But whether upon that prescience or no, there mine author fails me. This faggot being all one peece of wood, and that naturally growen, is wrapped about the middle part with a bond and parted at the ends into foure sticks, one of which is againe sub-divided into other twayne. And in semblable maner the last Erle's inheritance accrued unto 4 Cornish gent(lemen): Mohun, Trelawny, Arundell of Talverne and Trethurffe. And Trethurffe's portion Courtenay of Ladocke and Vivian do enjoy, as descended from his two daughters and heires".

== Portraits ==
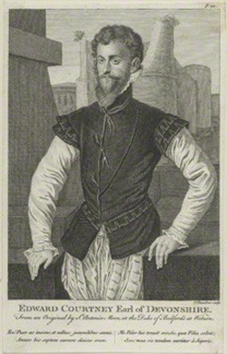
1762 engraving by Thomas Chambers (1724–1789) of portrait of Edward Courtenay, 1st Earl of Devon, inscribed at the bottom by the engraver: "From an original by Sr Antonio More at the Duke of Bedford's at Woburn". National Portrait Gallery, London, NPG D24892

- Sr. Antonio More. The best known portrait of Courtenay, bearded and in doublet and hose, standing before a semi-ruined castle, copied many times in oil and engravings, is by "Sr. Antonio More", at one time in the collection of the Duke of Bedford at Woburn Abbey. Such information is inscribed on the 1762 engraving of this picture by Thomas Chambers at the National Portrait Gallery in London, (NPG D24892) which records further the original inscription visible on the masonry to the left:

En! puer ac insons et adhuc juvenilibus annis,
Annos bis septem carcere clausus eram,
Me pater his tenuit vinclis quae filia solvit,
Sors mea sic tandem vertitur a superis.
("Behold! a guiltless boy and still in his youthful years, during twice-seven years had I been shut in prison, the father held me in these chains which the daughter released, thus at last is my fate being changed by the gods above".)

- Van Der Meulen. A portrait is said to exist of Edward Courtenay (d.1556) by Steven Van Der Meulen (c1543-1564). This however is identical to that engraved by Thomas Chambers in 1762 and described by him as by "Sr. Antonio More", then in the collection of the Duke of Bedford at Woburn Abbey. A copy of this "Van Der Meulen" made circa 1800, measuring 42"x31¾", was offered for sale at £4,500 on 23 February 2013 by Timothy Langston Fine Art & Antiques of London at the Powderham Castle Antiques and Fine Art Fair. Several other copies exist.
- Pastorino de Pastorini. The National Portrait Gallery in London owns a plaster cast of a lead commemorative medal made in Italy dated 1556, in the style of Pastorino de Pastorini, showing the head of Courtenay in profile circumscribed in capital letters in Italian spelling: Edoardo Cortneio. (National Portrait Gallery, London, NPG 2085a, 2 1/4 in. (57 mm) diameter).

== See also ==
- Nicodemite

Peerage of England
New title	Earl of Devon; 5th creation 1553–1556	Succeeded by William Courtenay de jure
