= Hall, Lanteglos-by-Fowey =

Historic estate in Cornwall, England

Hall in the parish of Lanteglos-by-Fowey in Cornwall, England, is an historic estate, most prominent as the seat of a branch of the Mohun family of Dunster Castle in Somerset. The family of Mohun of Hall was also seated at Bodinnick (alias Bodinnoc, etc.) also in the parish of Lanteglos-by-Fowey and later at Boconnoc, both in Cornwall, and was one of the four co-heirs of Edward Courtenay, 1st Earl of Devon (1527–1556), feudal baron of Okehampton, etc., of Tiverton Castle, Okehampton Castle, etc., the last of the mediaeval Courtenay Earls of Devon. In recognition of this in 1628 the senior representative of the Mohun family of Hall was created Baron Mohun of Okehampton, namely John Mohun, 1st Baron Mohun of Okehampton (1595–1641) eldest son and heir of Sir Reginald Mohun, 1st Baronet (1564–1639) of Boconnoc. The family of Mohun of Hall died out in the male line in 1712, following the death in a celebrated duel of Charles Mohun, 4th Baron Mohun of Okehampton (1677–1712), who died without progeny. However, the family had long out-lived the senior Dunster line which died out in the male line in 1375, following the death of John de Mohun, 2nd Baron Mohun, KG, (c. 1320 – 1375). Two monumental brasses survive in Lanteglos church to members of the Mohun family of Hall, namely Thomas Mohun (died c.1440) and John Mohun (d.1508).

== The Courtenay Faggot at Hall ==
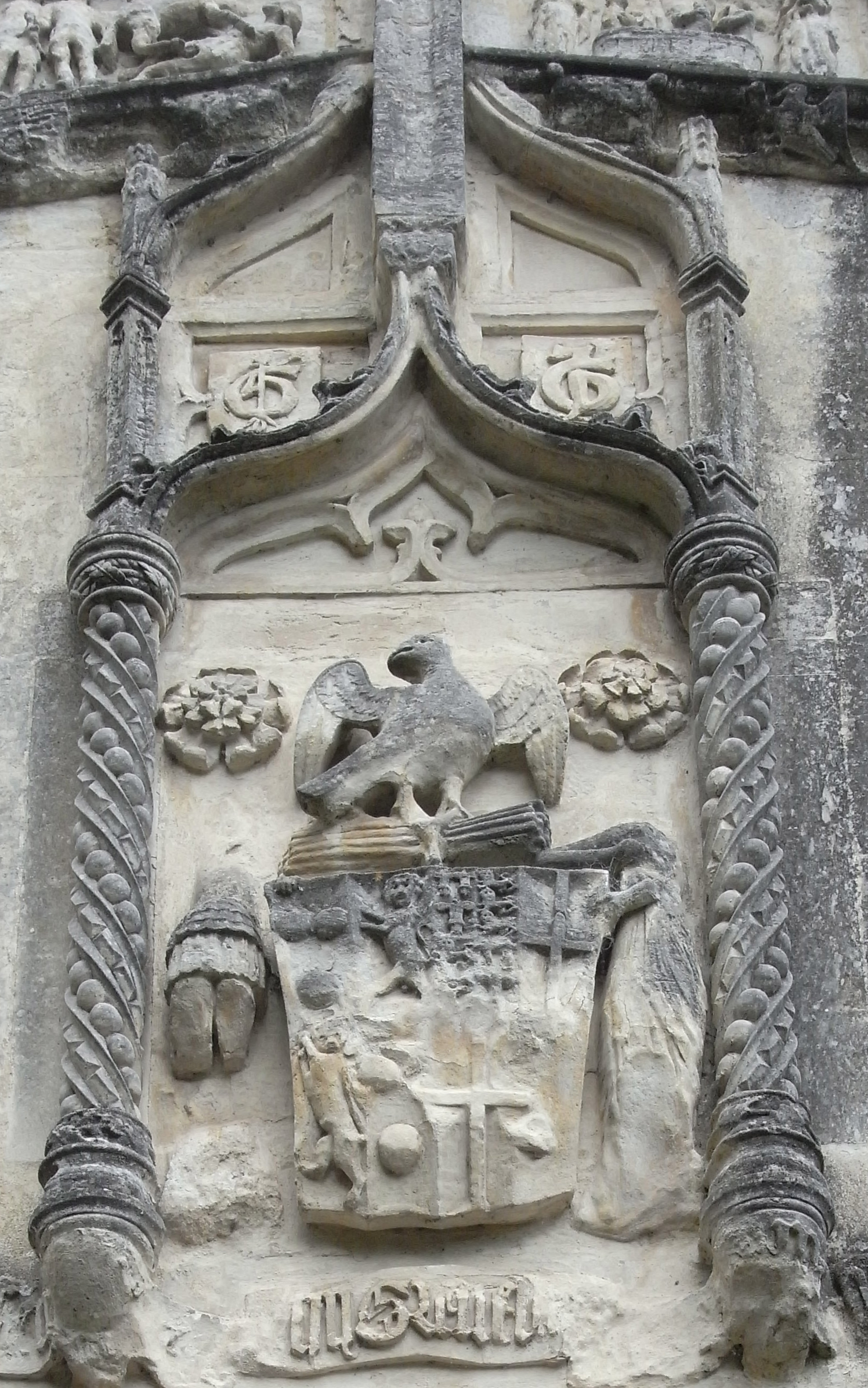
Arms of William Courtenay, 10th Earl of Devon (died 1511), of Tiverton Castle, above the south porch of St Peter's Church, Tiverton, next to the Castle. Part of the Greenway Chapel, built in 1517 by the wealthy Tiverton merchant John Greenway (died 1529), whose initials are seen above the Courtenay arms. Above and between two White Roses of York appears the heraldic badge of the Courtenays: A falcon rising holding in its claws a bundle of sticks, the Courtenay Faggot

The inheritance of the Trethurffe family of Trethurffe, Ladock, in Cornwall, of part of the estates of Edward Courtenay, 1st Earl of Devon (c. 1527 – 1556), the last of the Courtenay Earls of Devon seated at Tiverton Castle, was supposedly foretold by the Courtenay Faggot being "againe sub-divided into other twayne". The Courtenay Faggot was a mysterious naturally mis-shapen piece of wood split at the ends into four sticks, one of which again split into two, supposedly kept as a valued possession by the Courtenay Earls of Devon, "carefully preserved by those noble men".

It was later interpreted as an omen of the end of the line of Courtenay Earls of Devon via four heiresses. It was seen by the Cornish historian Richard Carew (died 1620) when visiting Hall, in the parish of Lanteglos-by-Fowey, Cornwall, then the dower house of Margaret Reskimer, the widow of Sir William Mohun (died 1588), MP, of Hall, the great-grandson of Elizabeth Courtenay, who described it in his Survey of Cornwall as follows:

"A farre truer foretoken touching the Earle of Devon's progeny I have seen at this place of Hall, to wit, a kind of faggot, whose age and painting approveth the credited tradition that it was carefully preserved by those noble men. But whether upon that prescience or no, there mine author fails me. This faggot being all one peece of wood, and that naturally growen, is wrapped about the middle part with a bond and parted at the ends into foure sticks, one of which is againe sub-divided into other twayne. And in semblable maner the last Erle's inheritance accrued unto 4 Cornish gent(lemen): Mohun, Trelawny, Arundell of Talverne and Trethurffe. And Trethurffe's portion Courtenay of Ladocke and Vivian do enjoy, as descended from his two daughters and heires".

== Descent ==
=== FitzWilliam ===
Sir John FitzWilliam held Hall in the early 14th century. His daughter and heiress was Elizabeth FitzWilliam, who married Reginald (alias Reynold) de Mohun, to which family passed Hall and several other estates.

=== Mohun ===
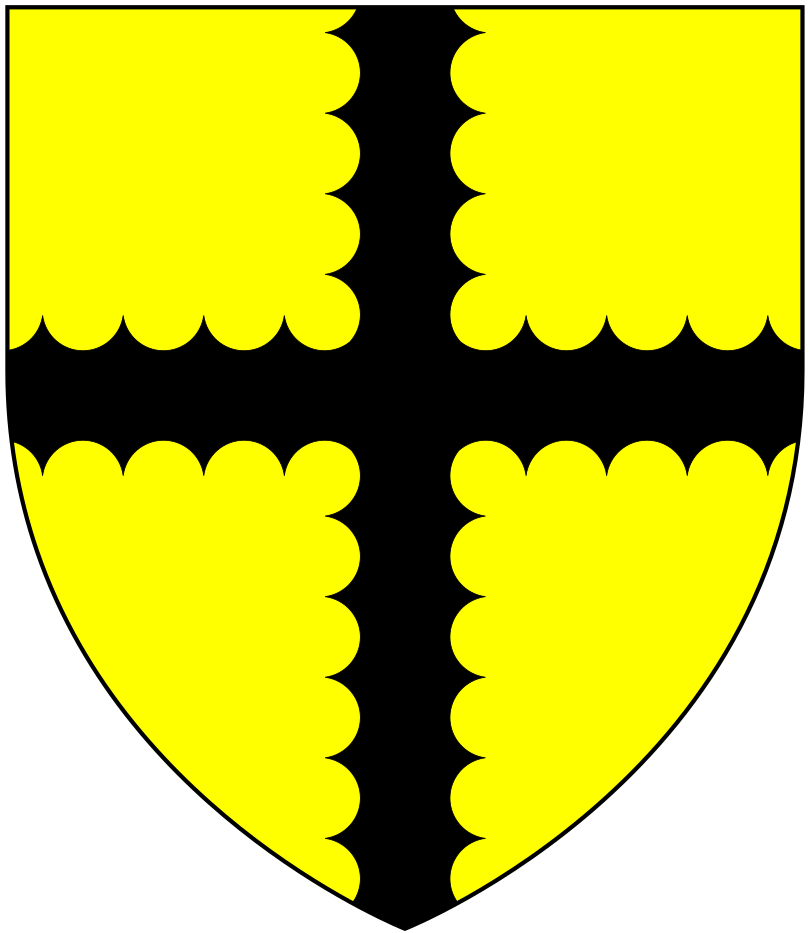
Arms of Mohun: Or, a cross engrailed sable

==== Reginald de Mohun (born c.1300) ====
Reginald (alias Reynold) de Mohun (born c.1300), the 4th son of John de Mohun, 1st Baron Mohun (1269–1330), feudal baron of Dunster by his wife Anne Tiptoft, daughter of Paine Tiptoft, married Elizabeth FitzWilliam, heiress of Hall, Bodinnoc and other valuable estates. His father granted him a life-interest in the manor of Ugborough in Devon. In 1323 he received a royal pardon from King Edward II for having taken part in the rebellion of the Earl of Lancaster and Roger Mortimer. In 1324-5 he was in Guienne on the King's service, and was abroad again in 1344, with Henry of Lancaster, Earl of Derby.

Maxwell Lyte relates a story "of very doubtful origin" that Reginald first met his future wife Elizabeth FitzWilliam when he came "into Fowey harbour with soldiers bound for Ireland, let fly a hawk at some game which came down in the garden at Hall". The couple were married, but he was soon deprived of his wife by her powerful neighbour Sir John Daunay, who "had designs upon her property". Daunay colluded with the Bishop of Exeter to effect a divorce of the couple on the canonical ground that Elizabeth had previously been engaged to one of Reginald's elder brothers, namely Thomas Mohun. Daunay "eloigned" Elizabeth from Mohun and having married her off to a certain Henry Deneys, then received quit-claims from Mohun of his FitzWilliam lands. However, Mohun made a successful appeal to the Pope, and at some time after 1346, he eventually recovered his wife and her lands, together with "enormous damages from two parsons who had been the accomplices or tools of Sir John Daunay".

==== John de Mohun ====
John de Mohun (son and heir), of Hall, who married firstly Joan St. Aubyn. He left a widow named Isabel who remarried to Sir Henry Ivelcombe.

==== Thomas de Mohun (died c.1440) ====
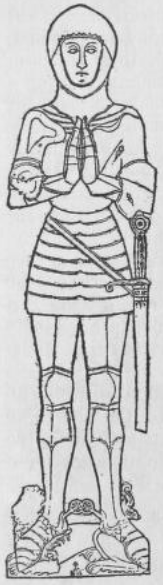
Drawing of monumental brass to Thomas de Mohun (died c.1440), St Willow's Church, Lanteglos

Thomas de Mohun (died c.1440) (son and heir) of Hall. He was a minor at his father's death. He married Elizabeth Hayre, daughter and heiress of Richard Hayre. His monument and monumental brass survives in St Willow's Church, Lanteglos, consisting of an obtuse arch under which is a low altar-tomb on the slab of which is affixed the brass effigy of a man in plate-armour, his feet resting on a dog with a Latin inscription within a ledger line:

Hic jacent Thomas de Mohun ac Johannes pater eius filius et heres Reginaldi de Mohun militis et Elizabeth(a)e uxoris su(a)e fili(a)e et heredis Johannis FitzWilliam militis qui(dem Reginaldus fuit) secundus frater Johannis ultimi domini de Mohun et predictus Thomas obiit ... die mensis ... anno Domini mille(n)simo CCCC... Quorum animabus propicietur Deus Amen. ("Here lie Thomas de Mohun and John, his father, son and heir of Reginald de Mohun, Knight, and Elizabeth his wife, daughter and heiress of John FitzWilliam, Knight, (which Reginald was) the second (sic) brother (sic) of John, the last lord of Mohun; and the aforementioned Thomas died on the ... day of the month of ... in the year of our Lord the fourteen hundredth and ...; on the souls of whom may God be favourably inclined")

The date of death was left blank, but is assumed by Dunkin (1882) to have been about 1440. There survive 3 of the original 4 brass heraldic shields: above left: three stag's heads cabossed the antlers drooping downwards; top right: bendy of seven; bottom left: missing, matrix only remaining; bottom right: Mohun with label of three points for difference.
