= Trethurffe, Ladock =

Historic estate in Cornwall, England

Trethurffe is an historic estate in the parish of Ladock, near Truro, in Cornwall.

== Descent ==
=== Trethurffe ===
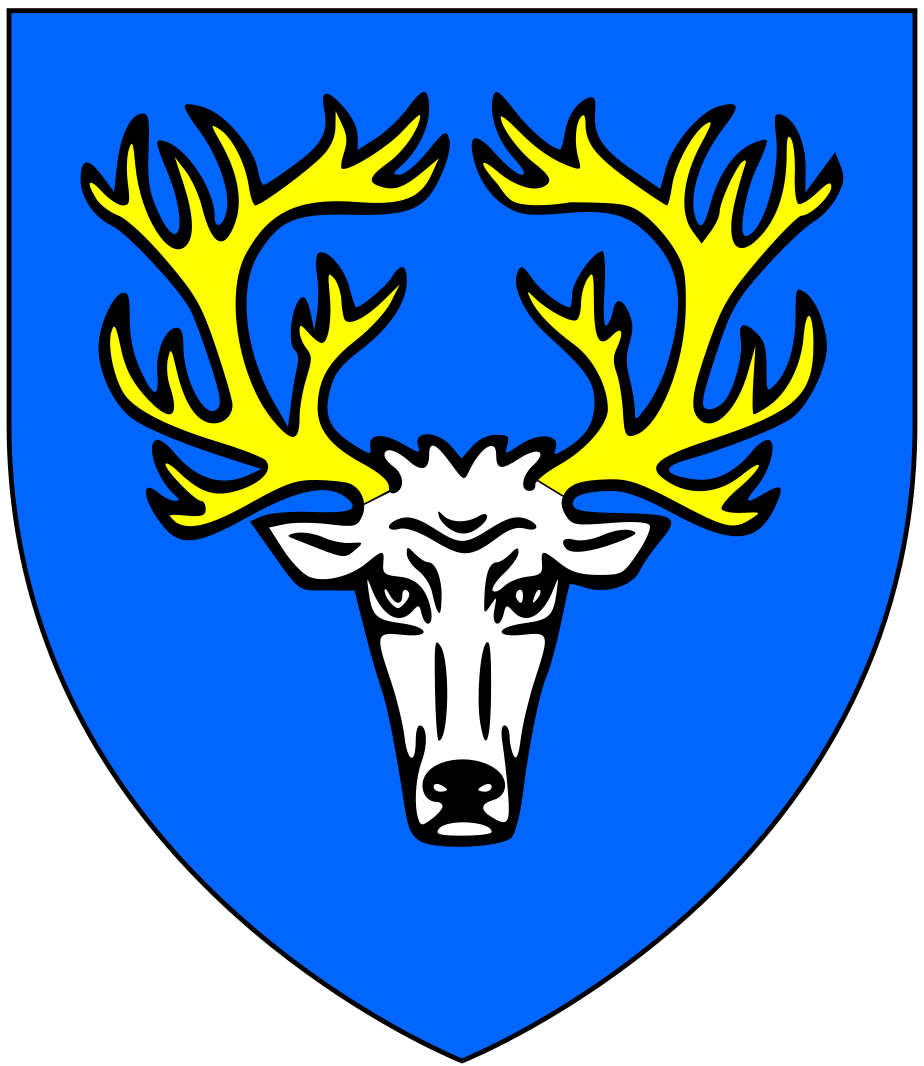
Arms of Trethurffe: Azure, a buck's head cabossed argent attired or

It was held for many generations by the Trethurffe family (originally de Trethurffe) which took its name from the estate. The later descent is given in the Heraldic Visitations of Cornwall as follows:

John Trethurffe
Whose wife was of the Trenowith family.
Reynold Trethurffe
Son and heir, who married Margaret St Aubyn, youngest daughter and co-heiress of John St Aubyn.
John Trethurffe (died 20 June 1510)
Son and heir, who married Elizabeth/Isabel Courtenay, one of the four sisters of Edward Courtenay, 1st Earl of Devon (died 1509) of Tiverton Castle in Devon, and a co-heiresses in her issue of her great-great-nephew Edward Courtenay, 1st Earl of Devon (died 1556) (Her brother's great-grandson), who died unmarried and without children, the last of the mediaeval Courtenay Earls of Devon seated at Tiverton Castle.
Thomas Trethurffe (1477–1529)
Son and heir, who married Maud Trevisa, daughter and heiress of ... Trevisa of Trevisa in Cornwall. He died with no sons, only two daughters who were his co-heiresses. His will reveals that he owned several "tin works" in Cornwall, which are listed in his will, transcribed in Testamenta Vetusta by Nicholas Harris Nicolas (1826). as follows:

"issues and profits of all my tynne-works in Whele Ankeye, Whele Flatt, Whele en duse gentill, and Whele Liana, Whele Angrovose, within the parish of St. Agnes, Whele Peyse in Elezar bonnale vine, within the parish of St. Peran, Beanie, quifer8, Penwinnas, within the parish of StAustell, Trewilke Whele, within the parish of St. Mewan, Dogowise and Trethillan, within the parish of St. Stephen in Brannel, and St. Enoder Beanne, within the parish of St. Columb, and elsewhere within the county of Cornwall".

He bequeathed much of his property to a certain "Alice, the wife of William Christopher", whom Nicolas suspected was his mistress: "It would perhaps be difficult to explain the motive which induced the testator to bequeath the chief part of his property to Alice, the wife of William Christopher, in a manner creditable either to his memory or her virtue". His will states:

"I will and bequeath all my tin-works, wheresoever they be, as be within my several grounds, or in waste ground, or elsewhere within the shire of Cornwall, to Alice Christopher, the wife of William Christopher, during her life ... to have and to hold to the said Alice ... during her life, and after her decease I will and bequeath all the said tin-works to the Wardens of the Shrine of St. Enoder, and their successors for ever, to the intent that the said wardens and their successors shall cause yearly my soul to be prayed for, my father and mother's souls, and all Christian souls".

Thomas Trethurffe's daughters and co-heiresses were:

- Elizabeth Trethurffe (born 1501), eldest daughter, wife of John Vivian (died 1562) "Senior" of Trelawarren, Cornwall, whose son was John Vivian (died 1564) "Junior" of Arralas, who married a certain Johanna and died without male children leaving two daughters and co-heiresses.
- Margaret Trethurffe (1503-1576), younger daughter, who married three times:
  - Firstly to John Boscawen (1494–1524) of Tregothnan and Tregarrick in Cornwall, by whom she has a son Thomas Boscawen who died without issue. John's younger brother and heir Hugh Boscawen was the ancestor of Hugh Boscawen, 1st Viscount Falmouth (died 1734).
    - Secondly to Edward Courtenay, son and heir of Edward Courtenay (died 1509) of Landrake in Cornwall, by whom she had issue, to which descended Trethurffe.
    - Thirdly to Richard Buller (died 1556), by whom she had children, Buller of Shillingham and later of Morval, which latter family came to great national prominence from the 18th century and ended in the male line with the Boer War hero General Sir Redvers Buller VC, GCB, GCMG (1839–1908) of Downes House, near Crediton in Devon.

==== The Courtenay Faggot ====
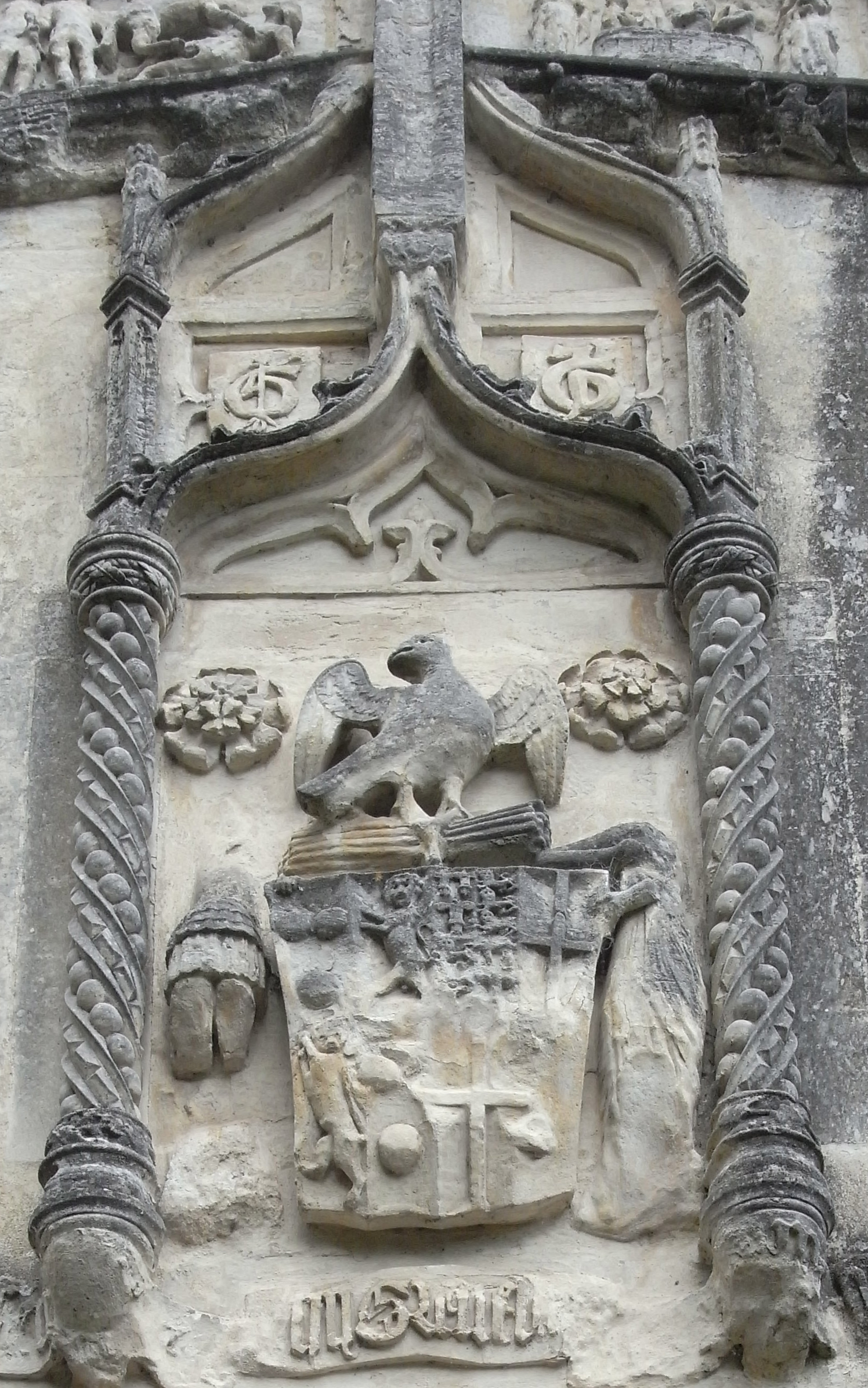
Arms of William Courtenay, 10th Earl of Devon (died 1511), of Tiverton Castle, above the south porch of St Peter's Church, Tiverton, next to the Castle. (Note: Part of the Greenway Chapel, built in 1517 by the wealthy Tiverton merchant John Greenway (died 1529), whose initials are seen above the Courtenay arms. Above and between two White Roses of York appears the heraldic badge of the Courtenays: A falcon rising holding in its claws a bundle of sticks.)

The Trethurffes' inheritance of part of the Courtenay estates was supposedly foretold by the Courtenay Faggot being "againe sub-divided into other twayne". The Courtenay Faggot was a mysterious naturally mis-shapen piece of wood split at the ends into four sticks, one of which again split into two, supposedly kept as a valued possession by the Courtenay Earls of Devon. It was later interpreted as an omen of the end of the line of Courtenay Earls of Devon via four heiresses. It was seen by the Cornish historian Richard Carew (died 1620) when visiting Hall in the parish of Lanteglos-by-Fowey, Cornwall, then the dower house of Margaret Reskimer, the widow of Sir William Mohun (died 1588), MP, of Hall, the great-grandson of Elizabeth Courtenay, who described it in his Survey of Cornwall as follows:

A farre truer foretoken touching the Earle of Devon's progeny I have seen at this place of Hall, to wit, a kind of faggot, whose age and painting approveth the credited tradition that it was carefully preserved by those noble men. But whether upon that prescience or no, there mine author fails me. This faggot being all one peece of wood, and that naturally growen, is wrapped about the middle part with a bond and parted at the ends into foure sticks, one of which is againe sub-divided into other twayne. And in semblable maner the last Erle's inheritance accrued unto 4 Cornish gent(lemen): Mohun, Trelawny, Arundell of Talverne and Trethurffe. And Trethurffe's portion Courtenay of Ladocke and Vivian do enjoy, as descended from his two daughters and heires.

=== Courtenay ===
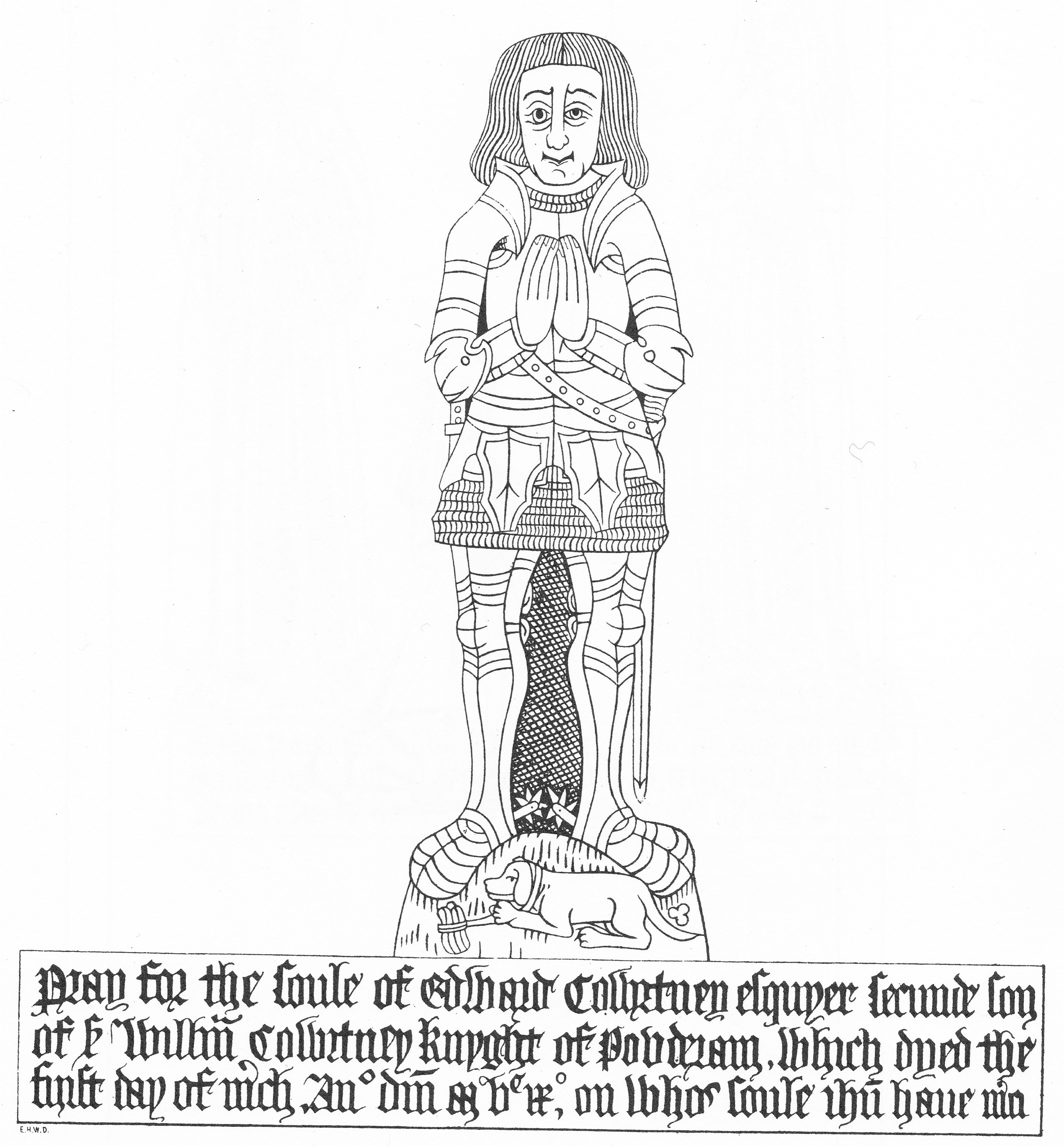
Monumental brass of Edward Courtenay (died 1509/10) of Landrake, Cornwall, second son of Sir William Courtenay (died 1485) of Powderham. Landrake Church

Edward Courtenay, husband of Margaret Trethurffe, heiress of Trethurffe
He was the son and heir of Edward Courtenay (died 1509) of Landrake in Cornwall (whose monumental brass survives in Landrake Church), the second son of Sir William Courtenay (died 1485) of Powderham in Devon, Sheriff of Devon in 1483, by his wife Alice Wotton (died 1533), daughter and heiress of John Wotton of Wotton in Landrake. The monumental brass of Edward Courtenay (died 1509) of Landrake is inscribed: "Pray for the soule of Edward Cowrtney esquyer secunde son of Sir William Cowrtney Knight of Povderam, which dyed the fyrst day of March Anno domini MV^{C}IX^{o} (Note: MV^{C}IX^{o} = M + (V*C) + IX = 1509; "in the year of Our Lord the one thousand five hundred and ninth"; the final superscript "o" (akin to the English "th") represents the last letter in the Latin ordinal millesimo quingentesimo nono ("in the 1,509th")) on whose soule ihesu have merci".

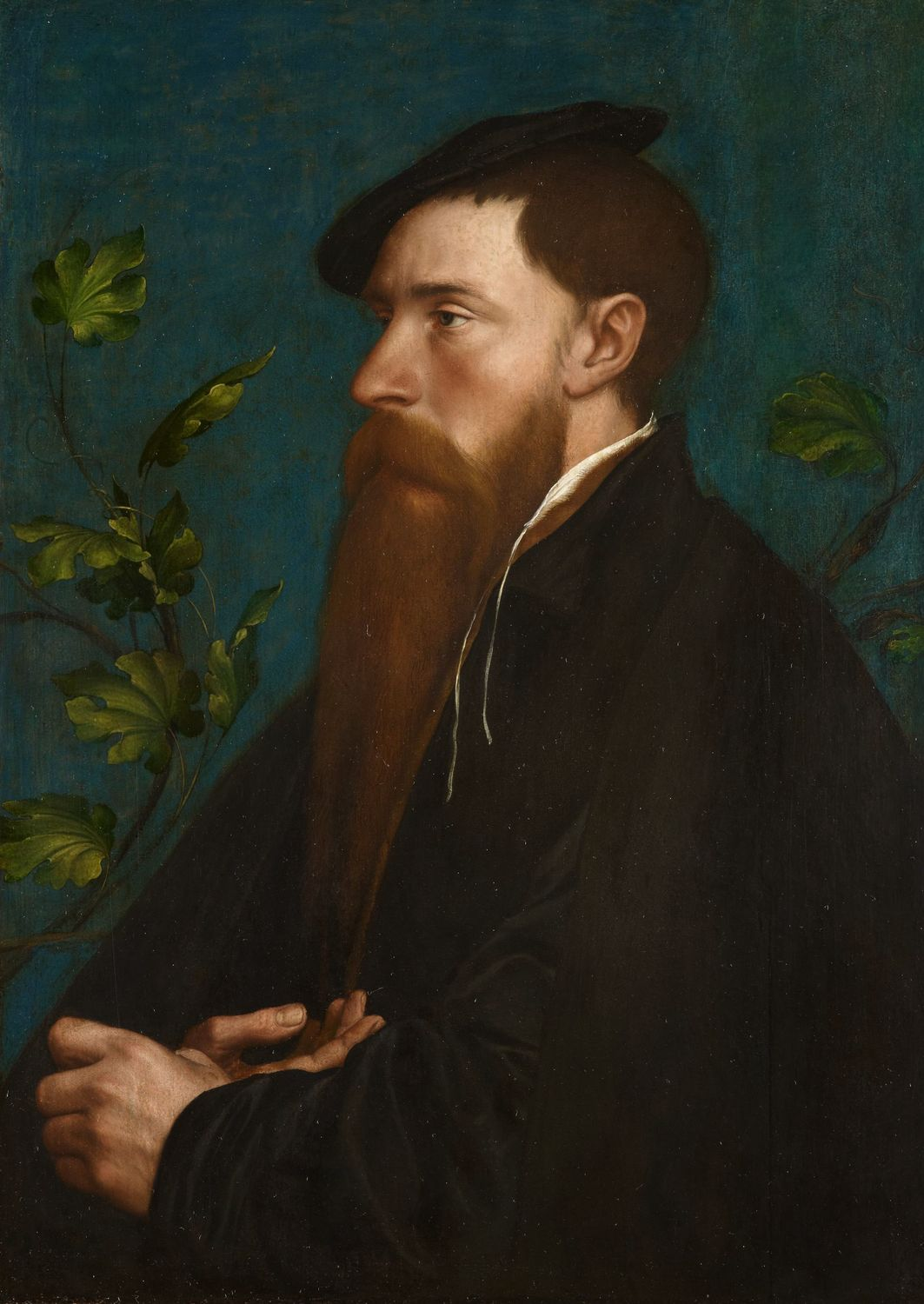
William Reskimer of St Tudy, a Groom of the Bedchamber to King Henry VIII, portrait circa 1532/4 by Hans Holbein the Younger (1497/1498–1543), Royal Collection, Windsor Castle

Arms of Courtenay of Powderham: Or, three torteaux a label of three points azure each charged with three plates

Peter Courtenay (1536–1606), eldest son and heir
A Justice of the Peace for Cornwall. His share of the inheritance from the Courtenay Earls of Devon included an eighth part of the advowson of St Peter's Church in Tiverton (next to Tiverton Castle), to which he appointed a rector in 1559 and 1593. He married Katherin Reskimer (born 1546), a daughter and co-heiress of William Reskimer of St Tudy, a Groom of the Bedchamber to King Henry VIII, whose portrait by Hans Holbein the Younger (1497/1498–1543) survives in the Royal Collection at Windsor Castle.

John Courtenay (1556–1615)
Eldest son and heir. In 1595 he married Ann St Aubyn, a daughter of Thomas St Aubyn of Clowance. The marriage was without surviving children and having survived her husband she remarried in 1620 to John Trevillian (alias Trevelyan) of Nettlecombe Court in Somerset.

Edward Courtenay (died 1622)
Younger brother and heir, who in 1622 sold the family's one-eighth share of the advowson of Tiverton. In 1614 he married Elizabeth Gorges (died 1629), eldest daughter and co-heiress of Tristram Gorges of Budockshed (alias Budshead) in the parish of St Budeaux, near Plymouth in Devon. She survived her husband and remarried twice, firstly in 1623 to William Bligh and secondly (as his 3rd wife) to Sir Ferdinando Gorges(1565–1647), sometime Governor of Plymouth, the "Father of English Colonization in North America", the founder of the Province of Maine in 1622.

Sir Peter Courtenay (1616–1670)
Eldest son and heir, of Trethurffe, who was knighted at York on 28 June 1642. he married twice. Firstly in 1638 to Alice Rashleigh (1619–1659), a daughter of Jonathan Rashleigh of Menabilly, near Fowey in Cornwall. A "release in trust" deed survives in the Cornwall Record Office dated 25 May 1661, summarised as follows:

"Peter Courteney of Trethurffe, Kt., to Jonathan Rashleigh of Menabilly, Esq., Henry Squire of Northill, Esq., and Jonathan Sparke of Plymouth Esq. Manor of Nordon near Kingsbridge, Devon, Trethurffe in Ladock, advowson of Ladock Church, Nansawsyn Mills, and Nankelly in Ladock, and manors of Trethurffe, Nansough, Tredrym in St. Just and Gerrans, Trevilveth in Veryan and Cuby, moiety of Treverbyn in Probus and other lands".

By Alice Rashleigh he had one son and four daughters including Anne Courtenay (1645–1677) who married Jonathan Rashleigh (1642–1702) of Menabilly, Sheriff of Cornwall in 1686/87, and twice MP for Fowey 1675-1681 and 1689-1695.
His second marriage was to Amy Courtenay, daughter of Peter Courtenay of Penkivel in Cornwall. She survived her husband and remarried to Sir Peter Fortescue, 1st Baronet (1620–1685) of Wood in the parish of Woodleigh, Devon.

William Courtenay (1647–1683)
Of Trethurffe, only son and heir, by his father's first wife Alice Rashleigh. He died without children and left his estates to his brother-in-law Humphry Courtenay of Tremere, the husband of his sister Alice Courtenay (1641–1684).

== Present day ==
In 2016 the remnant of the mansion house is a farmhouse with five acres of grounds, operated as a holiday let.
