= Grampound Road =

Village in Cornwall, England

Coordinates: 50.317°N 4.930°W

Grampound Road: Cornish: Fordh Ponsmeur
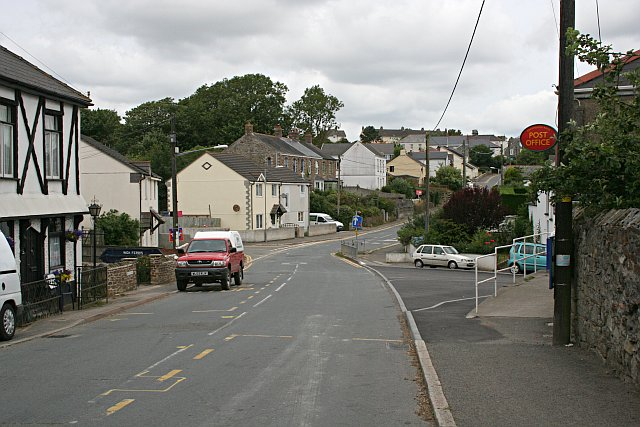
- Grampound Road

- Location within Cornwall
- OS grid reference: SW915505
- Civil parish: Ladock
- Unitary authority: Cornwall
- Ceremonial county: Cornwall
- Region: South West
- Country: England
- Sovereign state: United Kingdom
- Post town: Truro
- Postcode district: TR2

Grampound Road (Cornish: Fordh Ponsmeur) is a village in the parish of Ladock, Cornwall, England, 3 kilometres (1.9 mi) north-west of Grampound.

The railway station of that name was opened on 4 May 1859 and closed in 1964. A small village known as Grampound Road grew up around the railway station and continues to expand despite the station closing (along with other stations on the line) on 5 October 1964.

An annual horse fair was held in the 19th century; organised by Mr Joseph H Griggs of Nantellan. The 1882 fair was at that time considered to be the most successful, with events including hurdle and bank jumping.

Grampound Road is home to Grampound Road Cricket Club.

Grampound Road is also home to one shop which also contains a post office. Grampound Road Post Office also serves Probus and Ladock through an outreach program.

Grampound Road has a children's play area located within the recreation ground next to the cricket club.

Grampound Road has a primary school, Grampound Road Church of England School, and is overseen by the Rainbow Trust Academy, run by the diocese of Truro. The school has four classrooms and approximately 100 pupils.

There is a small industrial estate located at the new stables end of the village.

There is a small business area located opposite the shop, consisting of small office style units and a nursery catering for children aged from babies to 5 years old.
