= Tiverton Castle =

Country house in Devon, England

Coordinates: 50.9063°N 3.4885°W

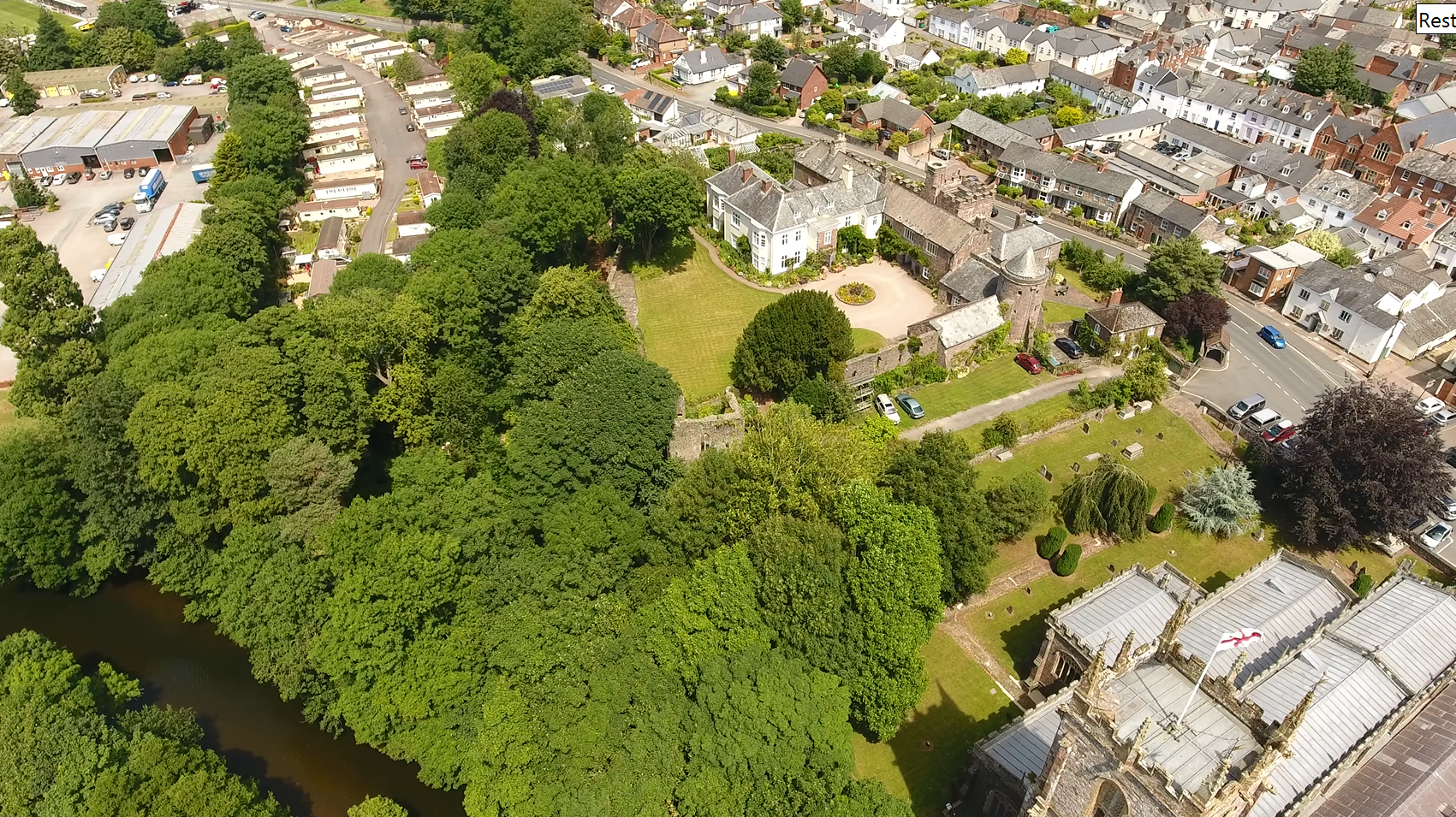
Tiverton Castle, aerial photograph with River Exe and St Peter's parish church. Looking towards north-east

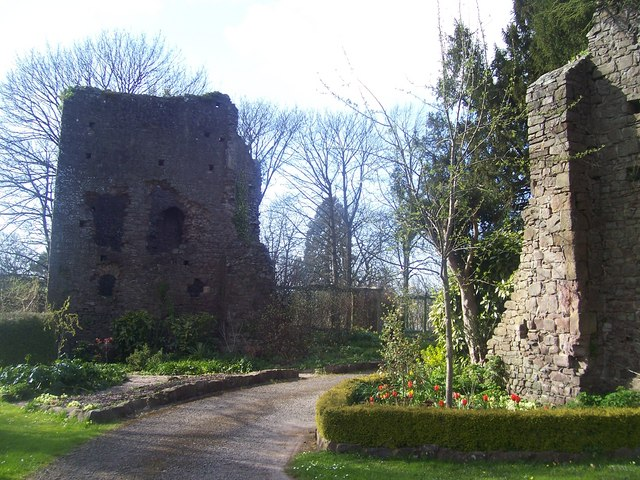
Left: remains of Solar Tower, c.1308-9, Tiverton Castle, built by Hugh de Courtenay, 1st/9th Earl of Devon (1276–1340). View from south-east

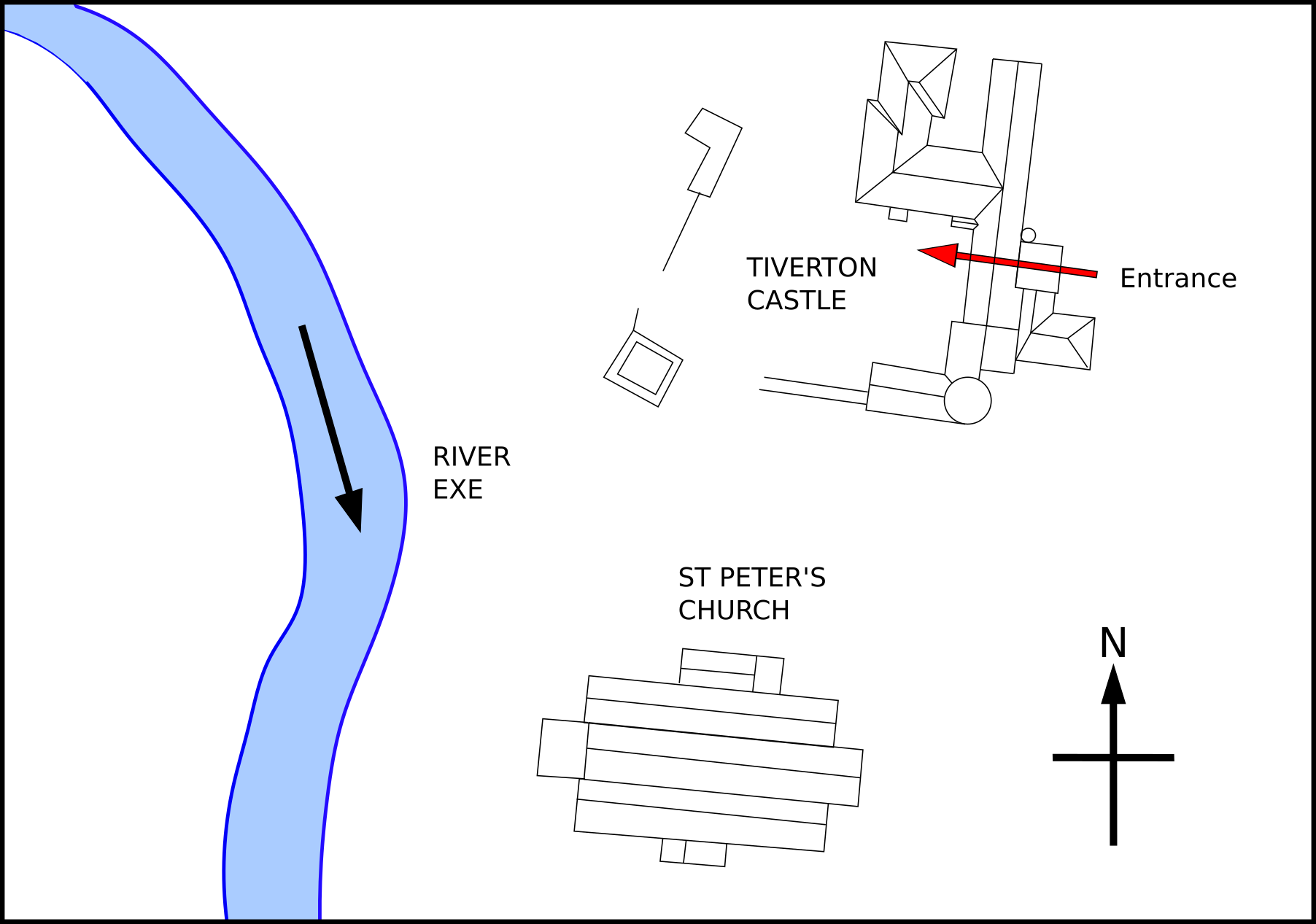
Groundplan of Tiverton Castle and setting

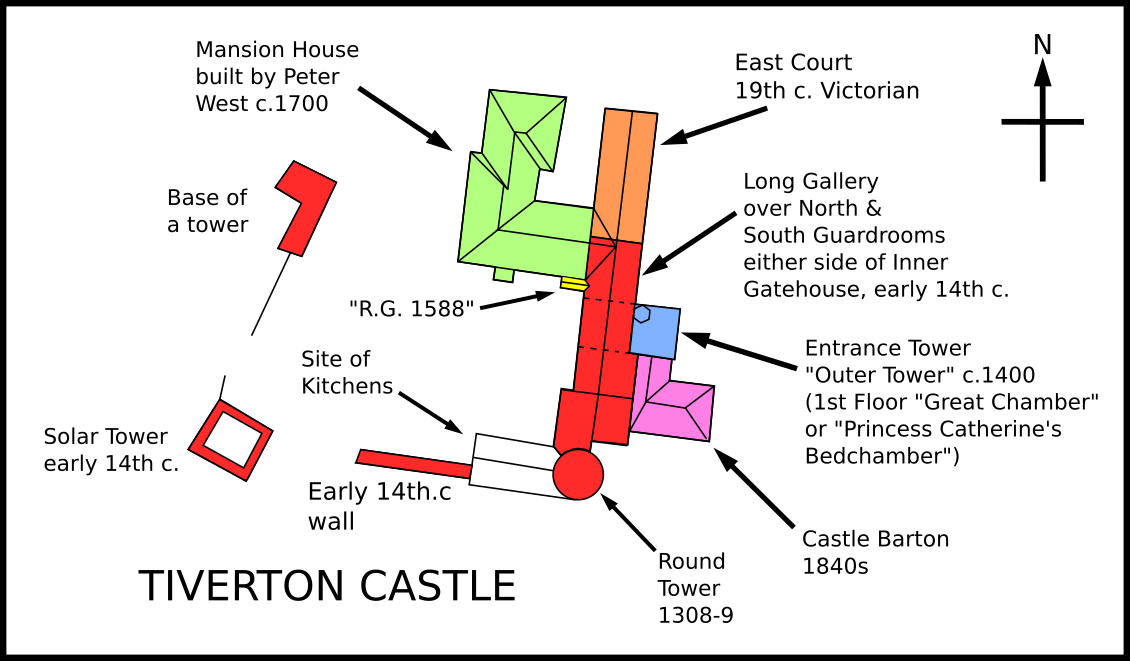
Tiverton Castle, detailed plan

Tiverton Castle is the remains of a medieval castle dismantled after the English Civil War and thereafter converted in the 17th century into a country house. It occupies a defensive position above the banks of the River Exe at Tiverton in Devon.

== Description ==
Once considerably larger, Tiverton Castle now comprises a group of ruined defensive perimeter walls, towers and buildings from various periods. A Norman motte was built in 1106.

== History ==
=== Civil War ===
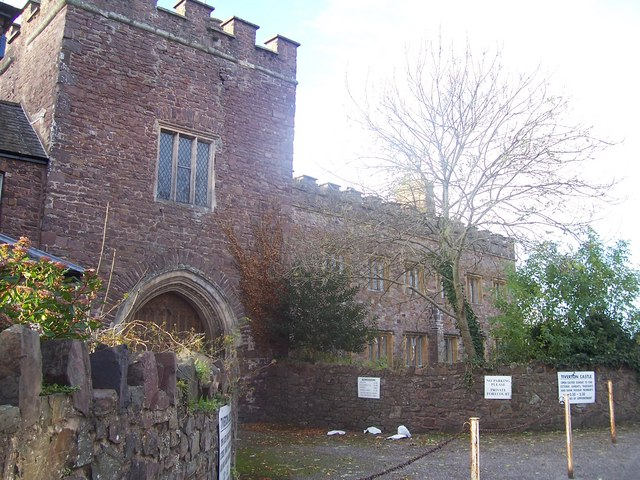
External view of the gatehouse, Tiverton Castle

During the Civil War the Castle was a Royalist stronghold. Fairfax's Parliamentarian troops laid siege to a troop of Royalists within the Castle and set up his headquarters at Blundell's School and stationed his artillery on Skrink Hills (or "Shrink" Hills) just above him and below Cranmore Castle, about half a mile from Tiverton Castle. The Culverin, the largest artillery piece used by the New Model Army, was capable of firing up to 2,000 yards. Whilst they were still finding their range a lucky shot hit one of the chains holding up the Castle's drawbridge and a small party of roundheads were able swiftly to gain entry and thus put an end to the siege almost before it had started. The bulk of the defensive structure was then demolished by Parliamentarian troops to prevent any military re-use of the structure.

The primary source is the 1645 narrative by John Rushworth (c.1612-1690) dated "Tiverton, Octob. 19. 1645. at nine a clock at night", entitled: The taking of Tiverton, with the castle, church, and fort, by Sir Thomas Fairfax, on the Lords-day last, Octob. 19. 1645. Wherein was taken Colonel Sir Gilbert Talbot, the governour. Major Sadler, major to Col. Talbot. 20. officers of note. 200. common souldiers. Foure peece of ordnance. 500. armes, with store of ammunition, provision, and treasure. Also the severall defeats given to Goring, by his Excellency, and all Gorings forces fled before him. Published according to order". The relevant passage is as follows:

Major Generall Massey did soone possesse himselfe of the Town of Tiverton, the Enemie marched away, onely those who were left in the Castle, and the Church, to keep those places. ... On Friday the 17. instant, our Generall Sir Thomas Fairfax sate downe before Tiverton-Castle and Church, to take them in, and summoned the enemy to deliver them up, of which being denied, we planted our batteries against them, which went forwards that day and the next. On Saturday Octob. 18. instant, our batteries were finished by the afternoone, and on this day being the Lord's day Octob. 19. instant, the Generall caused severall great pieces to be planted on the batteries against the Castle verie early, so that they were ready to play by breake of day, and all our Cannon began to play about seven a clocke in the morning, against the Castle, and the Enemie from thence answered us with their pieces, but did no execution upon us. And after many shot that we had made against them, a Cannonier by one shot gallantly performed this businesse, for he broke the chaine of the Draw-bridge with a bullet, which passeth over to the entrance of the Castle, which falling downe, the chaine being so broken, our Souldiers fell on without any further order from the Generall, they being loth to lose such an opportunitie, and loving rather to fight than to look on when God gives them such occasion, which took good effect, for they soone possessed themselves of all; they presently entred the Castle and Church, in which wee had foure men slaine: yet such is the mild and gentle carriage of the Generall, and his desire to spare the effusion of bloud, as much as may be, that notwithstanding they took it by storme, yet he himself gave command, that quarter should be given to all those who were alive: wee took in the castle Sir Gilbert Talbot who was Governour of the place, 20 other Officers, 200 Souldiers, four peece of Ordnance, good store of Armes and Ammunition, and abundance of treasure, which was divided amongst the Souldiers. The castle was verie strong, and the works all regular. ... A List of what was taken at Tiverton.

- Colonell Sir Gilbert Talbot, the Governour.
- Major Sadler, Major to Col. Talbot.
- 20 Officers of note.
- 200 Common Souldiers.
- Foure Peece of Ordnance.
- 500 Armes, with store of Ammunition, Provision, and Treasure.

== Descent ==
=== Redvers ===
In 1106 the large and important manor of Tiverton was granted by King Henry I (1100–1135) to Richard de Redvers (fl. 1066–1107), who built the castle. His son Baldwin de Redvers (died 1155), was created 1st Earl of Devon by the Empress Matilda during The Anarchy, probably in early 1141. Mary de Redvers, called "de Vernon" probably after the place of her birth, Vernon, a daughter of William de Redvers, 5th Earl of Devon (died 1217), married as her second husband Robert de Courtenay, whose mother was Hawise de Courci (died 1219), the heiress of the feudal barony of Okehampton. The 7th Redvers Earl died in 1262, without progeny, whereupon his sister, Isabella de Forz (died 1293), (Latinised to de Fortibus) the widow of William de Forz, 4th Earl of Albemarle, became Countess of Devon in her own right.

=== Courtenay ===
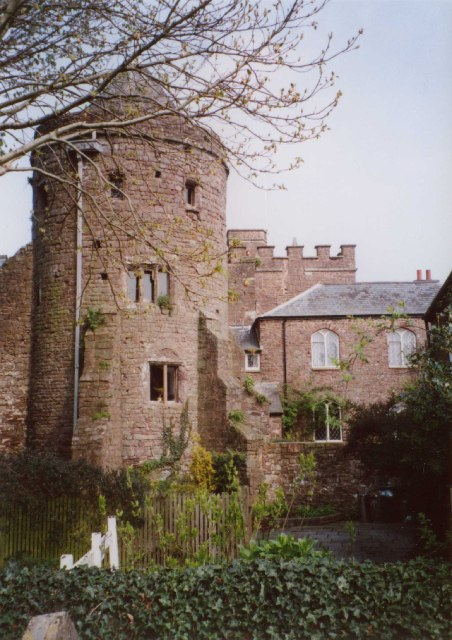
South-east tower, Tiverton Castle, external view

Isabella de Forz died in 1293 without surviving progeny and her heir was found to be her second cousin once removed, Hugh de Courtenay (1275/6-1340), feudal baron of Okehampton, the great-grandson of Robert de Courtenay by Mary de Vernon. He was summoned to Parliament in 1299 as Lord Courtenay, which created him a baron by writ, although he was already a feudal baron. In 1335 he was declared to be 1st Earl of Devon, of the second creation. Tiverton Castle was the principal seat of the Courtenay Earls of Devon throughout the mediaeval period including William Courtenay, 1st Earl of Devon whose wife Catherine of York was during her lifetime, daughter to Edward IV, sister to Edward V, niece to Richard III, sister-in-law to Henry VII and aunt to Henry VIII. However these connections did not save Catherine's son Henry Courtenay, 1st Marquess of Exeter, 2nd Earl of Devon (1498–1539) from being implicated in a plot and executed in 1539 by King Henry VIII. The Courtenays also held from the 13th-century Okehampton Castle, their original seat in England, and later built Colcombe Castle, both in Devon.

=== Russell, Seymour, Gates ===
After the attainder and execution of Henry Courtenay, 1st Marquess of Exeter, 2nd Earl of Devon (1498–1539) in 1539, King Henry VIII granted Tiverton to John Russell, 1st Earl of Bedford, whom the contemporary historian John Leland stated to have been holding it, amongst his other vast possessions, in 1540. After the death of King Henry VIII, the manor and castle of Tiverton were granted by the infant King Edward VI (1547–1553) to his uncle and the Lord Protector of the kingdom, Edward Seymour, 1st Duke of Somerset (c. 1500–1552), apparently the result of an exchange of lands between Russell and Seymour. The Duke was executed in 1552 by his nephew the king, who re-granted the manor and castle to Sir Henry Gates (1515–1589), MP, gentleman usher of the privy chamber and brother of Sir John Gates, knighted at the coronation of Edward VI, whom he served as captain of the guard. Sir John was an associate of John Dudley, 1st Duke of Northumberland (1504–1553) and a supporter of the claim to the throne of his daughter-in-law Lady Jane Grey and thus his brother Sir Henry Gates also fell under suspicion. On the accession of Queen Mary I (1553–1558) in 1553 Sir Henry Gates was tried for treason and attainted but escaped execution. Later that year of 1553 he was pardoned, but his lands were not restored to him.

=== Restored to Courtenay ===
Queen Mary restored Tiverton to Edward Courtenay (d.1556), the only son of the executed Henry Courtenay, 1st Marquess of Exeter, 2nd Earl of Devon, and created him Earl of Devon, under a new creation. On the death in 1556 of Edward Courtenay, 1st Earl of Devon (1527–1556) (1st Earl of the 5th creation of the Earldom of Devon granted by Queen Mary), without progeny, the manor and Castle of Tiverton devolved to his distant cousins, descended from the four sisters of his great-grandfather Edward Courtenay, 1st Earl of Devon (d.1509), KG. These sisters had married into the West Country families of Arundell of Talvern, Trethurfe, Mohun and Trelawney, and thus the Courtenay estates had been divided into four parts. Some of the heirs sold their shares.

=== Giffard ===
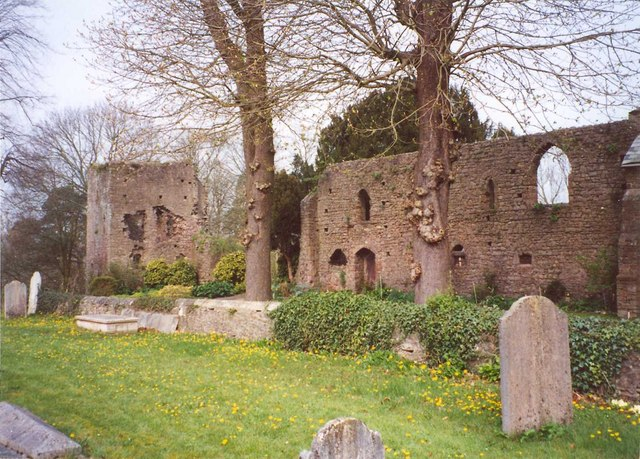
Mediaeval walls of Tiverton Castle viewed from the south from the churchyard of Tiverton parish church, in which was formerly situated the "Courtenay Chantry", containing monuments to the family, destroyed in the 16th century. Courtenay armorials survive above the south porch and high up on both sides of the chancel arch

One of the earliest purchasers of a share was Roger Giffard (1533–1603), who made Tiverton Castle his family home, and who was in the words of the Devonshire biographer John Prince "A worthy and eminent person, though it must be acknowledged the history of those actions which made him so is for the most part perished".

Roger Giffard was the 5th son of Sir Roger Giffard (d. 1547), who was born at Halsbury, the family's ancient seat in the parish of Parkham, but who married the heiress of Brightley in the parish of Chittlehampton, Margaret Coblegh (d.1548), daughter and sole heiress of John Coblegh of Brightley, whose monumental brass can be seen in Chittlehampton Church. Margaret Coblegh brought many estates to the Giffards of Brightley, including Stowford Snape, Wollacombe Tracy (near Braunton, where her son Roger Giffard was baptised and married), Bremridge (near South Molton) and Nymet St George (George Nympton), of which she was seized at her death. John Giffard (d.1622) of Brightley, the nephew of Roger Giffard (d.1603) of Tiverton Castle, is commemorated by an effigy in Chittlehampton Church. The armorials of Giffard and Coblegh of Brightley are visible on this elaborate monument at Chittlehampton and also appear above the porch of Brightley Barton. These also appear on the mural monument in Tiverton Church to Roger Giffard (d.1603) of Tiverton Castle. The line of Giffard which remained at Halsbury still owned that estate in about 1630, according to the Devon historian Tristram Risdon who was writing at that time. Halsbury was sold by the Giffards to the Benson family and then to the Davie's of Orleigh Court, in the adjacent parish of Buckland Brewer. In about 1800 Joseph Davie Bassett sold the estates of Halsbury and Orleigh to Edward Lee.

Roger Giffard (d. 1603) of Tiverton Castle married Audrey Stucley, daughter of Sir Hugh Stucley (1496–1560) who lived at Affeton Castle and his wife Jane Pollard, on 27 January 1563 at Braunton and was one of the feoffees under the will of Peter Blundell, the founder of Blundell's School in Tiverton. To this position were subsequently elected his son George Giffard in 1617, and his grandson Roger Giffard in 1633 . He purchased a quarter share of the manor of Tiverton, which was not incorporated as a town until 1615, and all the buildings comprising Tiverton Castle, which became known for a while as "Giffard's Court". He built the projecting tower porch situated within the courtyard in the angle where the gatehouse range meets the 17th-century north range, as evidenced by a date-stone set into the wall inscribed with the date "1588" and the initials "RG" (Roger Giffard). He lived through the devastating fire in Tiverton which broke out in the daytime of 3 April 1598 which killed 33 people, destroyed 400 houses and several chapels and destroyed merchandise valued at £150,000. His son George Giffard, named on his monument, was baptised at Braunton on 27 September 1564, matriculated at Exeter College, Oxford on 11 October 1583 aged 17 and died aged 58 on 26 June 1622. His son, named by Dunsford as Roger Giffard, died without male progeny and left a daughter his sole heiress who married Roger Burgoyne (or Burgoin, Esquire. In 1663 Burgoyne was elected feoffee of Blundell's Charity to occupy the former position held by the Giffards. He had two sons Robert and William Burgoyne, who sold the Castle and their quarter of the manor of Tiverton to Peter West, Esquire, who made it his home and served as Sheriff of Devon in 1707.

=== West ===
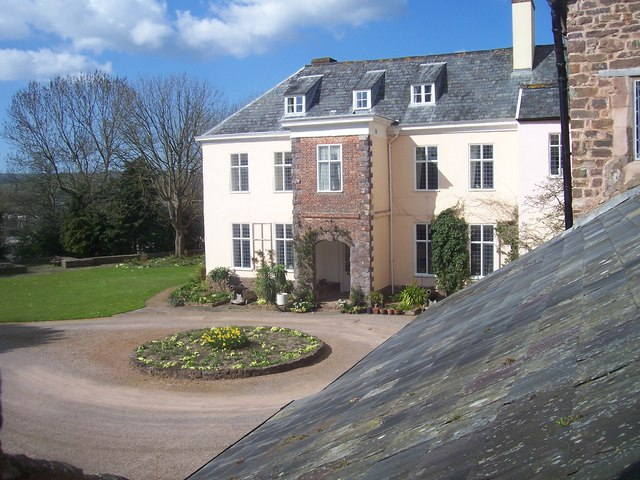
Late 17th-century north range, the residence of the Wests, view into the castle courtyard from the SE tower

In about 1605 Sir Reynell Mohun sold his quarter share to Mr John West (d.1630), a Tiverton merchant, whose monument exists in Tiverton Church. The West family had also purchased the Trelawney share. It appears that the Wests lived in the Castle until it was dismantled after the Civil War, but part was later rebuilt by the Wests for their residence.

=== Carew ===
On the death of John West, Esquire, in 1728, his family had amassed shares amounting to 6/8ths of the original manor, and as he died without male progeny, the property passed via one of his daughters and co-heiresses, Dorothy West, to her husband Sir Thomas Carew, 4th Baronet (c. 1692-c. 1746) of Haccombe. In 1822 Lysons wrote that the then possessor of the Castle was Sir Henry Carew, 7th Baronet (1779–1830) who had increased the family's share in the manor to 7/8ths, the additional 1/8th having been purchased by Dorothy, Lady Carew from the Rev. Mr Spurway, whose family had owned it for a considerable time. The Carews had seemingly let it to the tenant of the adjoining Barton, but it was repossessed and fitted up as a residence for Lady Carew, the mother of Sir Henry Carew, and it was her home in 1822 as reported by Lysons. The remaining 1/8th. in 1822 was held by Rev. Dr. Short, Archdeacon of Cornwall, who had purchased it from Edward Colman, Esquire, Serjeant of Arms to the House of Lords, whose family lived locally at Gornhay and had held the share for more than two hundred years.

=== Campbell ===
Carews descendants sold Tiverton Castle in 1923 and following various changes of ownership, it was purchased in 1960 by Ivar Campbell, whose nephew Angus Gordon inherited it in 1985.

== Sources ==
- Lysons, Daniel & Samuel, Magna Britannia, Vol 6, Devonshire, 1822, pp. 496–520
- Dunsford, Martin, Historical Memoirs of the Town of Tiverton, 1836 edition
- Listed building text, Tiverton Castle
