= Ladock =

Village in Cornwall, England

Coordinates: 50.320°N 4.959°W

Ladock: Cornish: Egloslajek
- Location within Cornwall
- Population: 1,513 (United Kingdom Census 2011 including Brighton)
- OS grid reference: SW895509
- Civil parish: Ladock
- Unitary authority: Cornwall
- Ceremonial county: Cornwall
- Region: South West
- Country: England
- Sovereign state: United Kingdom
- Post town: TRURO
- Postcode district: TR2
- Dialling code: 01726
- Police: Devon and Cornwall
- Fire: Cornwall
- Ambulance: South Western
- UK Parliament: Truro and Falmouth

Ladock (Cornish: Egloslajek (village) or Pluw Lajek (parish)) is a village and civil parish in Cornwall, England, United Kingdom. It is about six miles (9.5 km) north-east of Truro.

Historically, Ladock was two small settlements; Bissick by the river and Ladock on the hill. Notable features include the church, the school, the village hall and the historic Falmouth Arms pub. At the 2011 census the total population was 4,241.

The village had a station, Probus and Ladock halt, on the Cornish Main Line railway but services to the station ended in 1957.

== Parish church ==
The parish church of St Ladoca has a fine west tower built of granite blocks. The north side of the church is 13th-century in date while the south aisle is 15th-century. Repairs and alterations were carried out by George Edmund Street in 1862–1864. Street's interventions are notable for being his first professional collaboration with William Morris, his former student, whose windows in the church have been characterised as "the best display of Morris & Co. glass in Cornwall". Interesting features include the carved base of the rood screen and the font of Catacleuse stone. The feast traditionally celebrated in the parish is held on the Sunday after the first Thursday in January.

== Sustainable village ==
Ladock, in a joint venture with the nearby village of Grampound Road, has launched an effort to be Cornwall's premier sustainable village and set an example for the rest of the county. The scheme has been orchestrated by The Ladock and Grampound Road Transition group. The group today consists of around fifty active members and was set up in 2008 by people within the community concerned about socioeconomic and environmental issues such as climate change, the rising cost of oil and population growth.

In 2009, the transition group submitted an application for a nationwide government grant which they subsequently won. The grant of £500,000 was given to twelve varying communities across England and Wales to find out how small-scale communities could reduce carbon emissions from the bottom up. The communities are acting as test-beds for achieving sustainable living on a community-wide scale. In 2010 the villages together were named Cornwall Sustainable Village of the Year and awarded an additional £1,000 first prize to be invested in the community. The transition group encompassing the two villages has been praised for its high scores in five categories – local economy, village amenities, renewable energy and reducing environmental impact, plans for the future and the buzz factor.

As of early 2011, the project had completed the installation of carbon-reduction measures in sixteen homes (with varying housing types, age and occupancy), two schools, six local businesses and two community halls. Measures include heat pumps, biomass boilers, solar photovoltaic and solar thermal panels, as well the installation of dry lining and insulation in many properties. In addition, smart meters have been installed in participating properties to assist the monitoring of the behavioural change activities. The overall aim of the scheme is to deliver a reduction of 33% to the current carbon emission, equating to a saving of 123 tonnes of CO_{2} a year.

In the wider community, a carbon sequestration project has seen the planting of fruit and nut trees and 5-acre allotments site to naturally absorb and hold carbon while providing a boost to local food production. A community owned 20k wind turbine has also been installed. The generation of energy by means of renewables will be sold back to the National Grid, with money being generated via the government's adoption of Feed-in tariffs. A community managed fund will be set up to ensure that income made by electricity generating aspects of the scheme remain a rolling resource that will benefit the wider community. Income from feed-in tariffs and anticipated Renewable Heat Incentives from the government will be reinvested in more carbon saving measures so that the benefits of the programme will far exceed the initial targets of the project. In 2012 it delivered £20,000 profits to the local community. To reduce flooding, Ladock applied for funding to make weirs. When no funding came, they applied for beavers, which have since made terraced ponds on the streams, thereby successfully mitigating the potential for flooding.

== Cornish wrestling ==
Cornish wrestling tournaments, for prizes, were held in Ladock in the 1800s.

== Historic estates ==
- Trethurffe, Ladock
