= John Greenway (died 1529) =

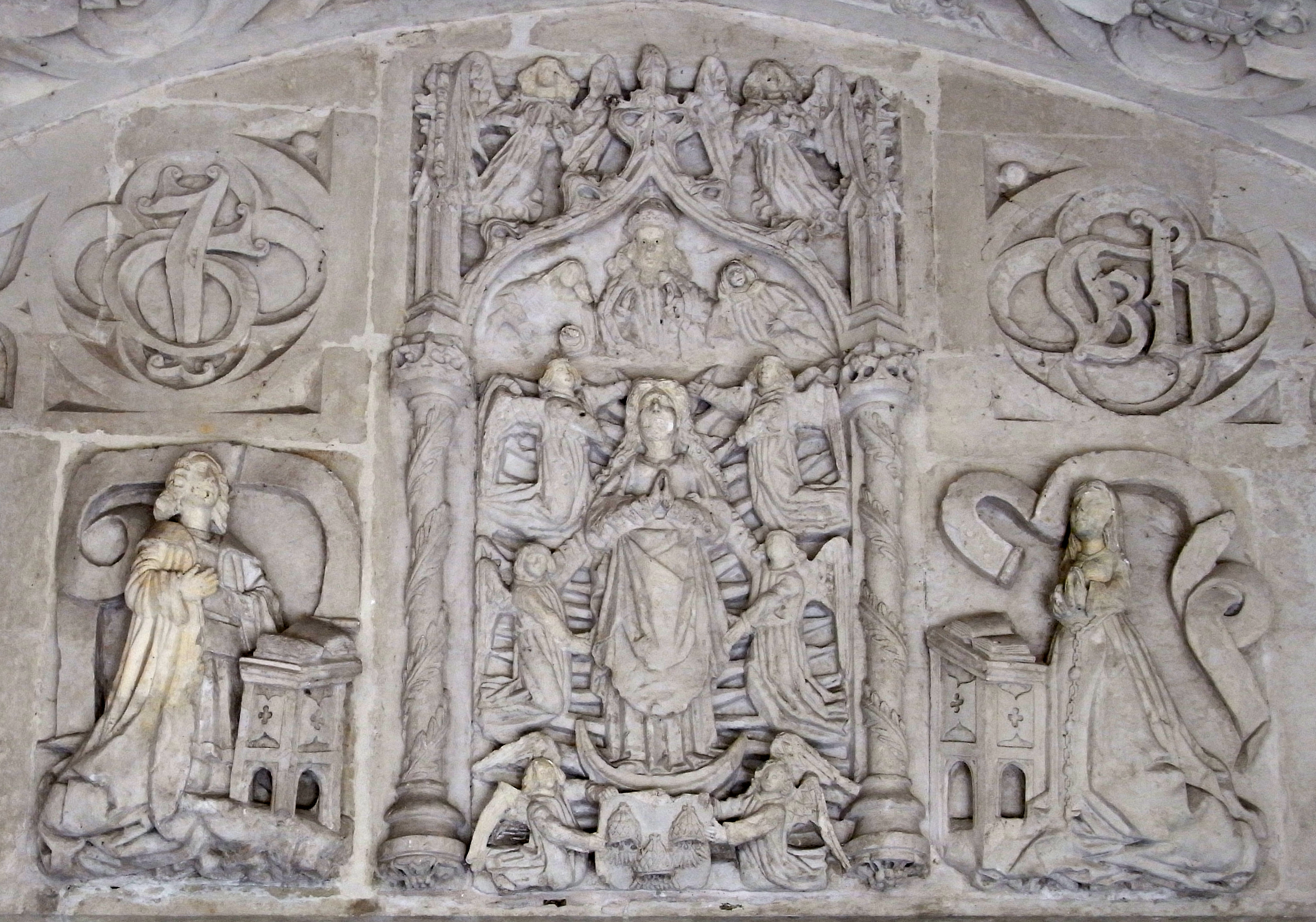
Assumption of the Virgin relief sculpture, 1517, in the Greenway Porch, showing John Greenway (left, with initials "JG" above) and his wife kneeling either side of the Virgin Mary who stands on a crescent moon and ascends to Heaven, with backdrop of a martyr's palm-frond, lifted up by angels to a figure of God the Father crowned as the King of Heaven, above. Below the Virgin is an heraldic escutcheon showing the arms of the Drapers Company (Azure, three clouds radiated proper each adorned with a triple crown or), with the very rarely surviving pre-Reformation angel supporters, the Virgin being the patroness of the Drapers Company

John Greenway (c. 1460—1529) was a wealthy wool merchant of Tiverton in Devon who is chiefly remembered for his surviving building works in that town, namely the Greenway Chapel and the Greenway Porch (both 1517) in St Peter's Church, and the Greenway Almshouse (1517) in Gold Street. He was a member of the Company of Merchant Adventurers of London and of the Worshipful Company of Drapers, the arms of which Companies adorn the Greenway Chapel. He is one of the Worthies of Devon of the Devonshire biographer John Prince (1643–1723).

== Origins ==
Greenway was born in Tiverton "of very mean parentage". Prince discovered no information concerning his ancestry but speculated that he was possibly descended from the Greenway family of Greenway in the parish of Brixham near Dartmouth, Devon, which family died out in the male line leaving a sole heiress Joan Greenway who became the wife of one of the "knightly family" of Gilbert of Compton Castle, which marriage is not however recorded in the Gilbert pedigree in the Heraldic Visitations of Devon up to 1620. Prince concluded that in his case ancestry was not "much material, a worthy man carries honor about him whatever his descent be".

== Career ==
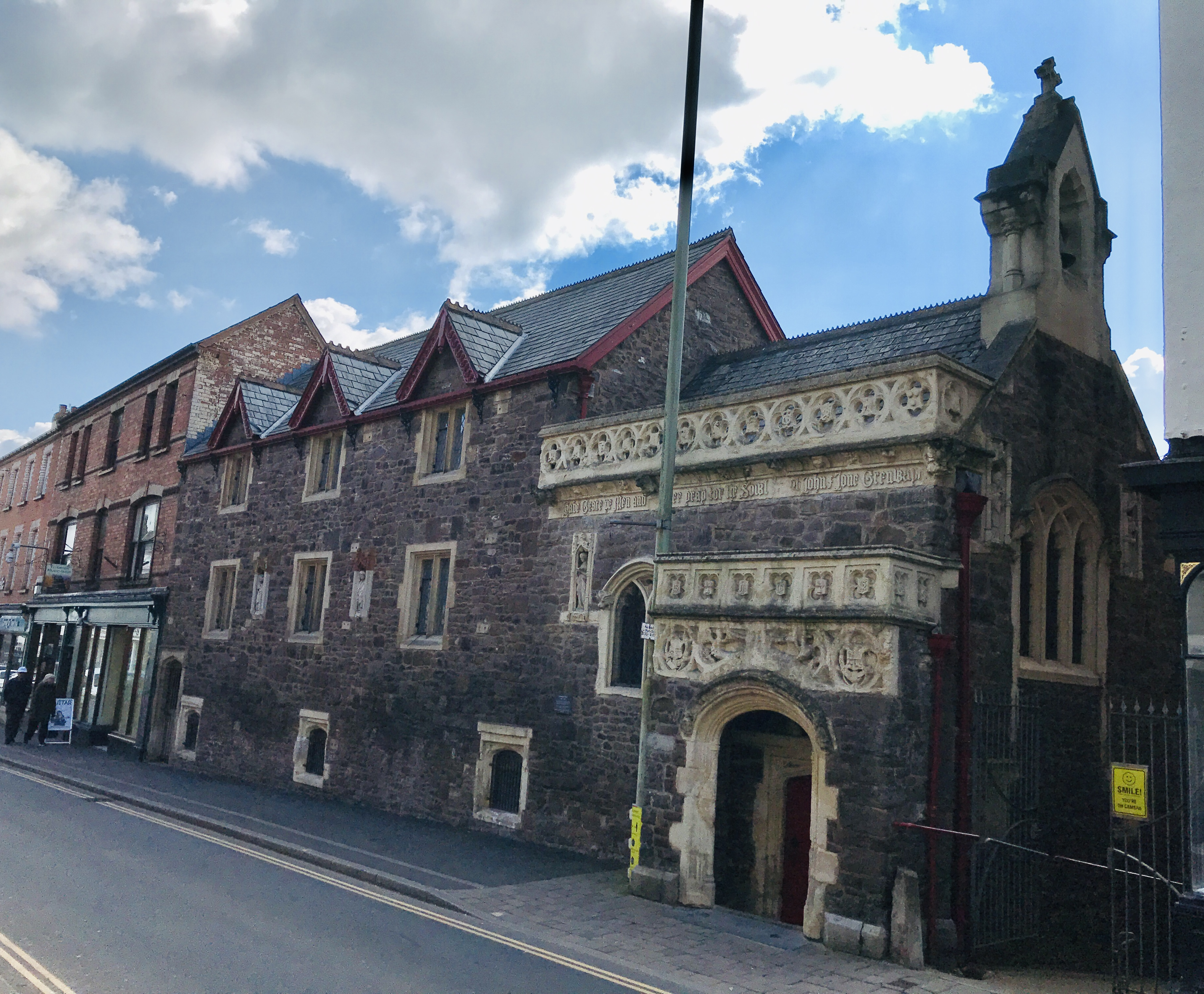
Greenway Almshouse on Gold Street in 2021

Prince states that "by the blessing of God and a diligent hand he grew vastly rich". His main business was the very profitable trade of importing Irish wool into England.

== Death and burial ==
He died in 1529 and was buried in the "Greenway Chapel" which he had built against the southern wall of St Peter's Church in Tiverton.

== Sources ==
- Prince, John, (1643–1723) The Worthies of Devon, 1810 edition, London, pp. 438–9, Greenway, John
- Goodall, John, Parish Church Treasures: The Nation's Greatest Art Collection, Chapter 68: The Church of St Peter, Tiverton, Devon, pp. 119–120 Google books
