= Pitt family =

English aristocratic family

The Pitt family were an English aristocratic family whose members included the Earls of Chatham, the Earls of Londonderry and the Barons Camelford. The family produced two British Prime Ministers: William Pitt, 1st Earl of Chatham, and his son William Pitt the Younger.

The family's fortunes were boosted greatly by Thomas Pitt who while serving as Governor of Madras acquired the Regent Diamond and sold it on at a great profit in 1717.

== Coat of arms ==
Pitt Coat of Arms

== Family tree ==
Family tree

John Pitt (died 1602)
Sir William Pitt (died 1636)	Thomas Pitt
Edward Pitt (died 1643)	The Rev. John Pitt (died 1672)
George Pitt (1625–1694)	John Pitt	Thomas Pitt (1653–1726)
George Pitt (died 1735)	John Pitt (died 1731)	John Pitt (died 1703)	Robert Pitt (died 1727)	Thomas Pitt, 1st Earl of Londonderry (died 1729)	John Pitt (died 1754)
George Pitt (died 1745)	John Pitt (died 1787)	George Morton Pitt (1693–1756)	Thomas Pitt (died 1761)	William Pitt, 1st Earl of Chatham (1708–1778)	Thomas Pitt, 2nd Earl of Londonderry (died 1734)	Ridgeway Pitt, 3rd Earl of Londonderry (died 1765)
George Pitt, 1st Baron Rivers (1721–1803)	Sir William Augustus Pitt (died 1809)	William Morton Pitt (1754–1836)	Thomas Pitt, 1st Baron Camelford (1737–1793)	Lady Hester Pitt (1755–1780)	John Pitt, 2nd Earl of Chatham (1756–1835)	William Pitt the Younger (1759–1806)
George Pitt, 2nd Baron Rivers (1751–1828)	Louisa Pitt (1754–1791)	Anne Pitt (1772–1864)	Thomas Pitt, 2nd Baron Camelford (1775–1804)
George Dean Pitt (died 1851)

== Other relatives ==
- Robert Nedham, married Catherine Pitt daughter of Robert Pitt and Harriet Villiers, on 21 May 1733.
- Louisa Pitt married into the Beckford family marrying Peter Beckford
