= Reginald Mohun =

Reginald Mohun may refer to:

- Reginald Mohun (died 1567), MP for Liskeard, Launceston, Helston, Rye
- Sir Reginald Mohun, 1st Baronet (1564-1639)
- Reginald Mohun (died 1642), MP for Lostwithiel, a son of Sir Reginald Mohun, 1st Baronet
