= Anne Pitt as Hebe =

Painting by Élisabeth Vigée Le Brun

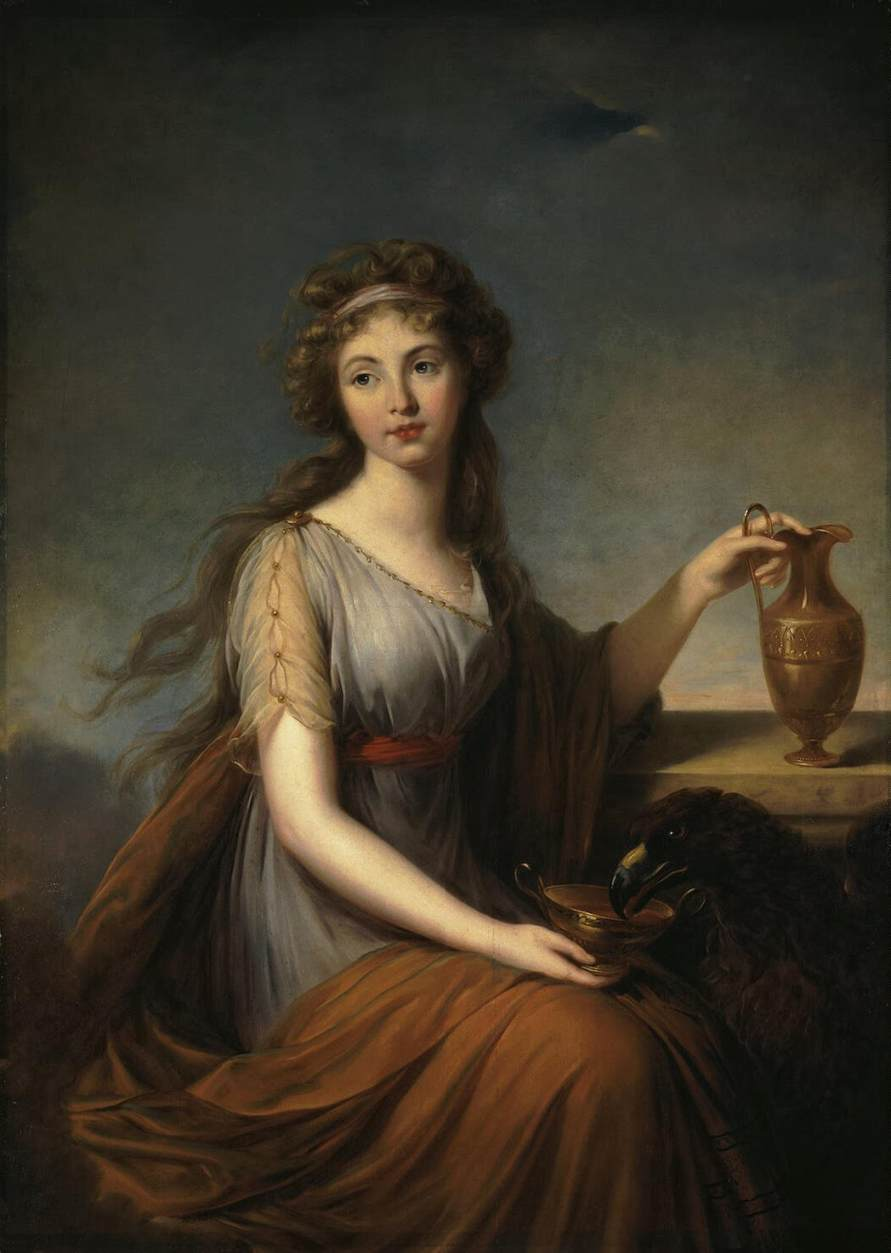
- Artist: Élisabeth Vigée Le Brun
- Year: 1792
- Type: Oil on canvas, portrait painting
- Dimensions: 140 cm × 99.5 cm (55 in × 39.2 in)
- Location: Hermitage Museum; Saint Petersburg

Anne Pitt as Hebe is a 1792 portrait painting by the French artist Élisabeth Vigée Le Brun. It depicts the English noblewoman Anne Pitt, the daughter of Thomas Pitt, 1st Baron Camelford of Boconnoc in Cornwall. She was part of the extended Pitt dynasty, a dominant force in British politics in the eighteenth century. She married her cousin the politician William Grenville and as Baroness Grenville was his wife when he held office as Prime Minister of the United Kingdom as leader of the Ministry of All the Talents from 1806 to 1807.

She was in Rome accompanying her father on a visit to Italy when she posed for Le Brun, the portrait taking seven sittings. She returned to England in June the same year and married Grenville in July. The portrait shows her in the role of Hebe, a figure from Greek mythology. Today the painting is in the collection of the Hermitage Museum in Saint Petersburg.

== Bibliography ==
- Baillio, Joseph & Baetjer, Katharine & Lang, Paul. Vigée Le Brun. Metropolitan Museum of Art, 2016.
- Helm, W.H. Elisabeth Louise Vigée-Lebrun. Parkstone International, 2018.
- Ingamells, John. A Dictionary of British and Irish Travellers in Italy, 1701–1800. Yale University Press, 1997.
- Lorigan, Catherine. Boconnoc: The History of a Cornish Estate. The History Press, 2017.
- Pomeroy, Jordana & Blakesley, Rosalind Polly (ed.) An Imperial Collection: Women Artists from the State Hermitage Museum. Merrell, 2003.
- Sheriff, Mary D. The Exceptional Woman: Elisabeth Vigee-Lebrun and the Cultural Politics of Art. University of Chicago Press, 1997.
