= Reginald Mohun (died 1642) =

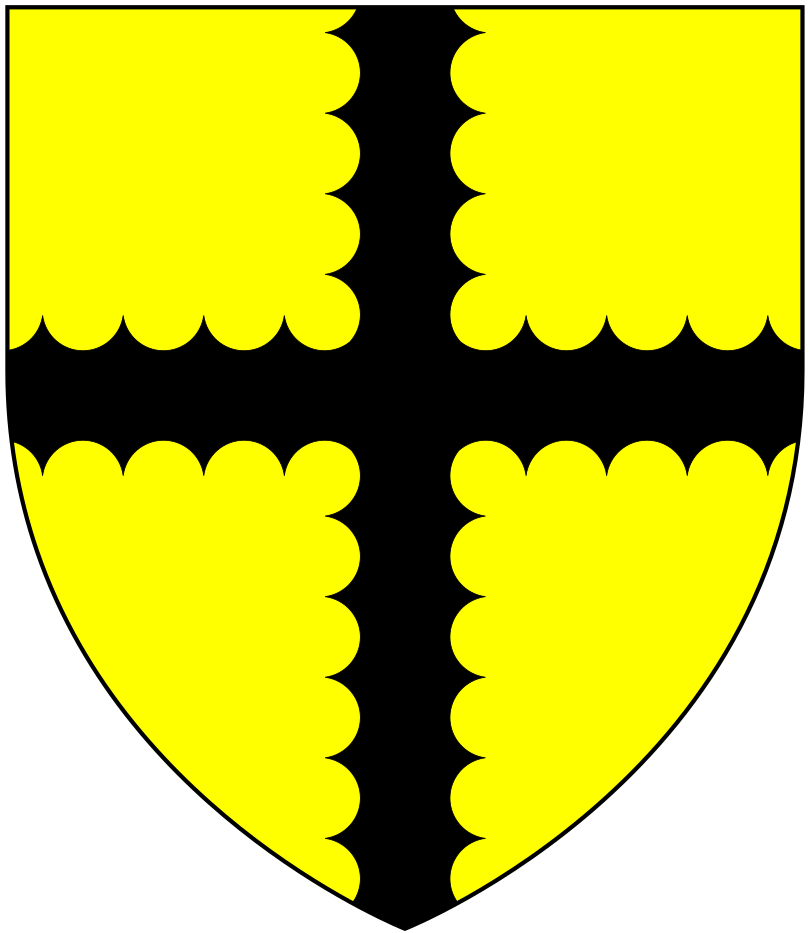
- Arms of Mohun: Or, a cross engrailed sable

Member of the England Parliament for Lostwithiel
- In office 1625–1626 Serving with: George Chudleigh 1625; Henry Vane 1625; Nicholas Kendall 1625; Robert Mansell 1626
- Preceded by: John Chichester; John Hobart
- Succeeded by: Robert Carr; Thomas Badger

Personal details
- Born: c. 1605
- Died: c. 1642
- Parent: Sir Reginald Mohun, 1st Baronet (father)

Reginald Mohun (c. 1605 – c. 1642) of Trewynard (Trewinnard, St Erth) in Cornwall, was a Member of Parliament for Lostwithiel, Cornwall, in 1626.

== Origins ==
He was born in 1605, the 2nd son of Sir Reginald Mohun, 1st Baronet (1564–1639) of Boconnoc in Cornwall, by his 3rd wife Dorothy Chudleigh, a daughter of John Chudleigh (1565-1589), MP, of Ashton in Devon, and sister of Sir George Chudleigh, 1st Baronet (c.1578-1658), MP for Lostwithiel, Cornwall, in 1621 and 1625 and for East Looe, Cornwall, in 1614.

== Career ==
He matriculated at Exeter College, Oxford on 13 December 1622, aged 17, and was awarded BA on 10 June 1624. He was a student of law at the Middle Temple in 1625. In 1625, he was elected a Member of Parliament for Lostwithiel, Cornwall, in a double return which was probably not resolved in the time of the parliament.

This election result is not recognised in his History of Parliament biography. He was definitively re-elected MP for Lostwithiel in 1626.

== Marriage and children ==
He married twice:

- Firstly to Mary Southcote, a daughter of Sir George Southcote of Shillingford, Devon, MP, by whom he had one son and one daughter:
  - Reginald Mohun, a minor at the death of his father;
  - Dorothy Mohun (born 1636)
- Secondly, to a certain Dorothy, of unrecorded family, who survived him.

== Death ==
He died before 15 August 1642 when his will was proved.

== Sources ==
- History of Parliament biography

Parliament of England
Preceded by Double return	Member of Parliament for Lostwithiel; 1626; With: Sir Robert Mansell 1626	Succeeded by Sir Thomas Badger; John Chudleigh
