= Anne Grenville, Baroness Grenville =

English noblewoman

The Right Honourable The Lady Grenville
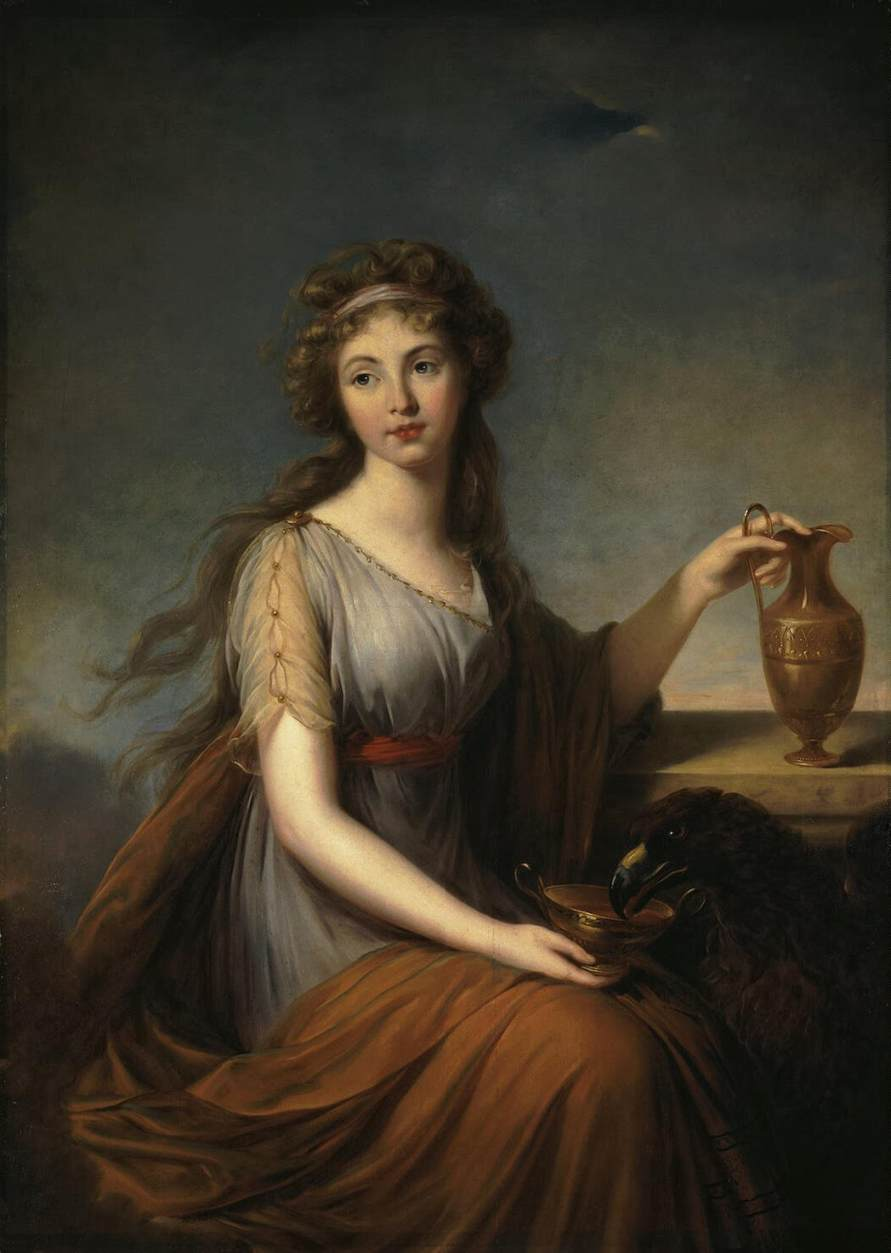
- Anne Pitt as Hebe (1792)
- Born: Anne Pitt; September 1772
- Died: June 1864 (aged 91)
- Occupations: Author, noblewoman
- Known for: Spouse of the prime minister of the United Kingdom (1806–1807)
- Spouse: William Grenville, 1st Baron Grenville (m. 1792; died 1834)
- Parent(s): Thomas Pitt, 1st Baron Camelford; Anne Wilkinson
- Relatives: William Pitt, 1st Earl of Chatham (granduncle); William Pitt the Younger (first cousin once removed)
- Family: Pitt

Anne Grenville, Baroness Grenville (née Pitt, September 1772 – June 1864) was an English noblewoman and author, and a member of the Pitt family, which at the time dominated British politics. She was Spouse of the Prime Minister of the United Kingdom between 1806-1807.

== Biography ==
Anne Pitt was the daughter of Thomas Pitt, 1st Baron Camelford and his wife, Anne Wilkinson. Her granduncle was William Pitt the Elder. She accompanied her father on a visit to Italy. While in Rome she posed for Anne Pitt as Hebe, a portrait by the French artist Élisabeth Vigée Le Brun depicting her in the role of Hebe.

She married then-Foreign Secretary William Wyndham Grenville, Baron Grenville, on 18 July 1792. The Grenville family was already associated with the Pitts family, through Pitt the Elder's marriage to Hester Grenville, William Grenville's aunt. Both Anne Pitt and William Pitt the Younger were his cousins. The union was supported by her father, Baron Camelford and Grenville's uncle, The Marquess of Buckingham, a dominant figure in the Grenville family who provided a £20,000 dowery. Grenville went on to be Prime Minister from 1806 to 1807.

In 1804, Anne Pitt inherited the considerable wealth of her brother "the half-mad Lord", Thomas Pitt, 2nd Baron Camelford, who had been killed in a duel. The inheritance amounted to £500,000 in value, including the Boconnoc House and estates in Cornwall, and Camelford House in London.

Grenville died in 1834, and Anne survived him until June 1864.

== Archives of her correspondence ==
Two archives of her correspondence exist in the British Library and in the Hampshire Archives.

== Arms ==
Coat of arms of Anne Grenville, Baroness Grenville
