= Baron Mohun of Okehampton =

Extinct barony in the Peerage of England

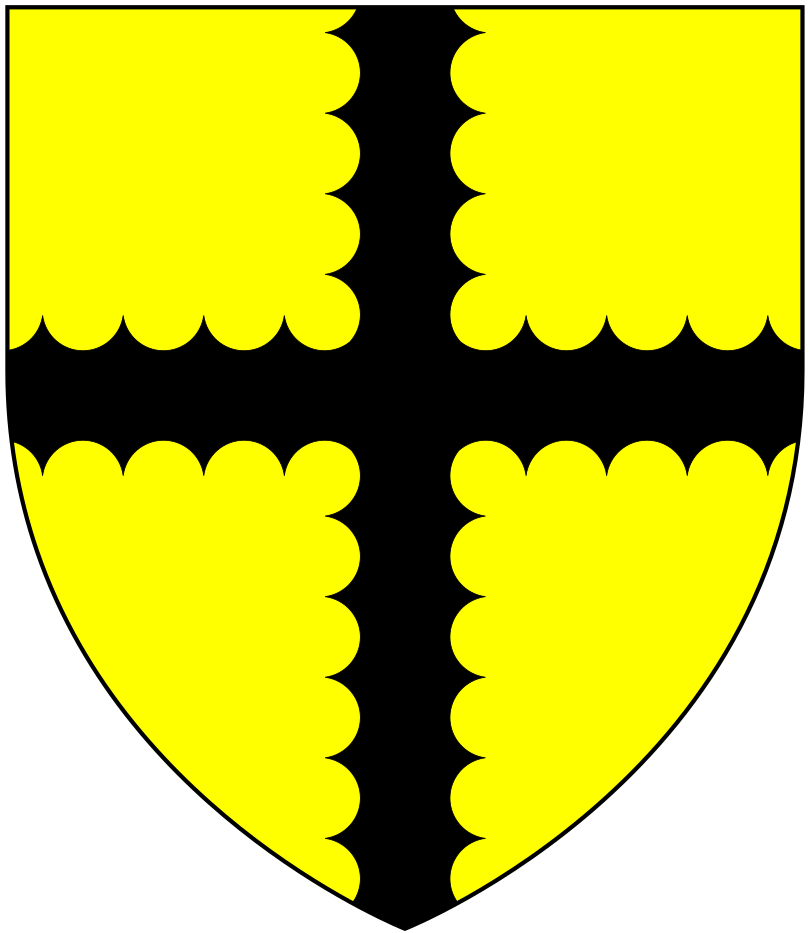
Arms of Mohun: Or, a cross engrailed sable

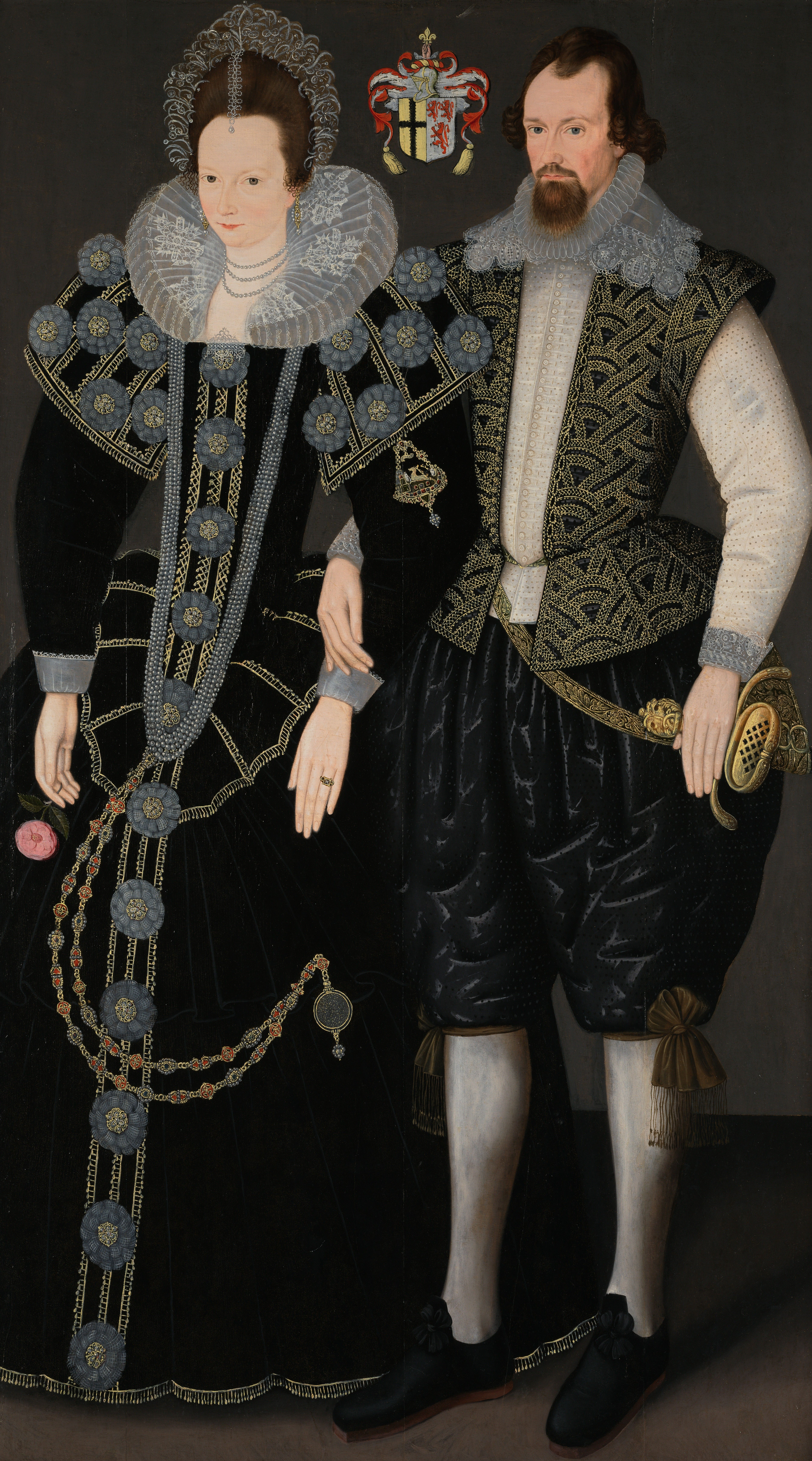
Sir Reginald Mohun, 1st Baronet, and his 3rd wife Dorothy Chudleigh, parents of John Mohun, 1st Baron Mohun of Okehampton

Baron Mohun of Okehampton was a title in the Peerage of England. It was created on 15 April 1628 for John Mohun, formerly a Member of Parliament for Grampound, Cornwall.

The family was formerly seated at Hall in the parish of Lanteglos-by-Fowey in Cornwall, and was a junior branch of the Mohun family, feudal barons of Dunster, of Dunster Castle in Somerset, of whom the first member, the warrior William de Moyon (died post 1090), had come over with William the Conqueror during the Norman Conquest of 1066. The family of Mohun of Hall was also seated at Bodinnick (alias Bodinnoc, etc.) also in the parish of Lanteglos-by-Fowey and later at Boconnoc, both in Cornwall, and was one of the four co-heirs of Edward Courtenay, 1st Earl of Devon (1527–1556), feudal baron of Plympton, feudal baron of Okehampton, etc., of Tiverton Castle, Okehampton Castle, etc., the last of the old Courtenay Earls of Devon. This was due to the marriage of William Mohun of Hall to Elizabeth/Isabel Courtenay, one of the four daughters of Sir Hugh Courtenay (d.1471) of Boconnoc (nephew of Edward de Courtenay, 3rd/11th Earl of Devon (1357–1419), "The Blind Earl"), whose son Edward Courtenay, 1st Earl of Devon (d.1509) was created Earl of Devon following the extinction of the mediaeval Courtenay Earls during the Wars of the Roses. The great-grandson of the latter was Edward Courtenay, 1st Earl of Devon (1527–1556), who died without progeny, one of whose co-heirs was his distant cousin Sir Reginald Mohun (born 1509) of Hall, great-grandson of Elizabeth Courtenay and William Mohun.

In recognition of this ancestry, in 1628 the senior representative of the Mohun family of Hall was created Baron Mohun of Okehampton, namely John Mohun, 1st Baron Mohun of Okehampton (1595-1641) eldest son and heir of Sir Reginald Mohun, 1st Baronet (1564–1639) of Boconnoc. The family of Mohun of Hall and Boconnoc died out in the male line in 1712, following the death by duel of Charles Mohun, 4th Baron Mohun of Okehampton (1677-1712), who died without progeny. However, the family had long out-lived the senior Dunster line which died out in the male line in 1375, following the death of John de Mohun, 2nd Baron Mohun, KG, (c.1320-1375), of Dunster.

John Mohun, 1st Baron Mohun of Okehampton (1595-1641) was the son of Sir Reginald Mohun, 1st Baronet of Boconnoc in the County of Cornwall, in the Baronetage of England, which baronetcy had been created on 25 November 1611. Sir Reginald Mohun subsequently sat as Member of Parliament for East Looe and Lostwithiel. In 1639, eleven years after his elevation to the peerage, Lord Mohun of Okehampton succeeded his father in the baronetcy. The 4th and last Baron was best known for his frequent participation in duels, which was the cause of his death, and for his reputation as a rake. The titles became extinct on his death on 15 November 1712.

The family surname was pronounced "Moon".

== Mohun baronets, of Boconnoc (1611) ==
- Sir Reginald Mohun, 1st Baronet (c. 1564–1639)
- Sir John Mohun, 2nd Baronet (1596–1640) (had been created Baron Mohun of Okehampton in 1628)

== Barons Mohun of Okehampton (1628) ==
- John Mohun, 1st Baron Mohun of Okehampton (1595–1640)
- Warwick Mohun, 2nd Baron Mohun of Okehampton (1620–1665)
- Charles Mohun, 3rd Baron Mohun of Okehampton (c. 1645–1677)
- Charles Mohun, 4th Baron Mohun of Okehampton (1677–1712)

Baronetage of England
| Preceded by Englefield baronets | Mohun baronets 25 November 1611 | Succeeded by Gorges baronets |
