= Howell Gwynne (MP) =

British politician

Howell Gwynne (16 April 1718 – 1780) was a British politician. He was a Member of Parliament (MP) for Radnorshire from 1755 to 1761, and Old Sarum 1761 to 1768.

Educated at Christ Church, Oxford, Howell stood unsuccessfully at the 1754 general election as candidate for Breconshire. The following year he was chosen by chosen by the agents of the Duke of Newcastle as their candidate for the Radnorshire seat which had been vacated by Sir Humphrey Howorth. He was elected unopposed, and his expenses £173 were paid out of secret service money.

His subsequent appointment as Lord Lieutenant of Radnorshire offended Lord Carnarvon, and a deal was eventually reached whereby Gwynne would remain Lord Lieutenant for five years, and at the next election abandon Radnorshire in favour of a seat in the rotten borough of Old Sarum. Carnarvon took the Radnorshire seat, and Gwynne was duly returned for Old Sarum at the 1761 general election, and held it until 1768. Described as "dim", he not recorded as having ever spoken in the House of Commons.

By 1765 he was canvassing again in Radnorshire. However, Chase Price then entered the race and won such support that Gwynne did not contest the 1768 general election.

Parliament of Great Britain
Preceded by Sir Humphrey Howorth	Member of Parliament for Radnorshire; 1755 – 1761	Succeeded by Marquess of Carnarvon
Preceded by Sir William Calvert; Viscount Pulteney	Member of Parliament for Old Sarum; 1761 – 1768; With: Thomas Pitt of Boconnoc; Thomas Pitt the younger	Succeeded by William Gerard Hamilton; John Craufurd
