= Humphrey Howorth =

British landowner and Whig politician

Sir Humphrey Howorth (c.1684–1755), of Maesllwch Castle, Radnorshire, was a British landowner and Whig politician who sat in the House of Commons for 33 years from 1722 to 1755.

Howorth was the son of Humphrey Howorth and a daughter of Charles Lloyd (died 1698) who brought Maesllwch into the family. He married Sibel Mainwaring daughter of Roger Mainwaring, He or his father rebuilt the house at Maesllwch Castle and established the surrounding park in 1715.

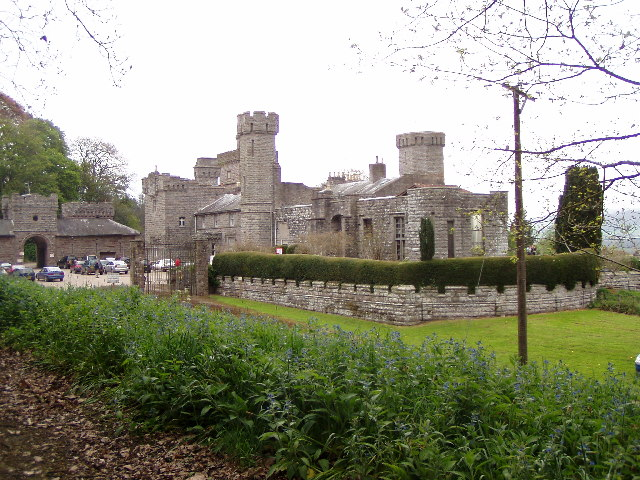
Maesllwch Castle

Howorth was receiver of crown rents in Cheshire from 1714 to 1730 and was knighted on 21 August 1715. Because he owned Maesllwch, he had a strong electoral interest in Radnorshire and as a Whig, he was led to believe that it was impossible for the Tories to put up against him. However the Duke of Chandos, Lord Lieutenant of the county, who also had a strong interest through stewardship of the King’s manors, decided to lead a sustained campaign against him.

In 1719 he was one of the original backers of the Royal Academy of Music, establishing a London opera company which commissioned numerous works from Handel, Bononcini and others.

At the 1722 general election Howorth was elected convincingly as Whig Member of Parliament for Radnorshire but it was a fierce and expensive contest. He faced further expensive contests in 1727 and 1734 which he won but had to counter petitions against the results. By this time, the contests had cost him at least £10,000, and in 1740 he wrote to Walpole petitioning for the Lord Lieutenant to be replaced. This was unsuccessful and at the 1741 he again faced an expensive contest, which he won. His financial difficulties were compounded when he was ordered to pay into the Treasury £3,000 arrears from the crown rents which he had collected in Cheshire before he lost the receivership in 1730. As a result, he had to sell much of his estate to his tenants, which affected his political influence. The Duke of Chandos died in 1744 and in 1746 the stewardship of the Kings Manors was passed to the brother of Howorth’s friend and ally, Thomas Lewis, and thus the interests were brought together. At the 1747 general election, there was opposition, but no contest. By about 1750 Howorth was described as miserably poor and dependent on any Administration. At the 1754 general election he was returned unopposed. He voted regularly with the Administration but, for all the expense, seems to have made little impression in Parliament.

Howorth’s wife Sibel died on 4 March 1742 and he married as his second wife Mary Williams, widow of Henry Williams of Gwernyfed, Breconshire and daughter of John Walbeoffe of Llanhamlach, Breconshire. He died on 4 February 1755, leaving a son and daughter by his first wife. Maesllwch was encumbered by a mortgage of £26,000, and by the Treasury claim amounting in 1765 to £8,000. It was bought by the Clive family.

== See also ==
- Henry Howorth

Parliament of Great Britain
Preceded by Richard Fowler	Member of Parliament for Radnorshire; 1722–1755	Succeeded by Howell Gwynne
