= Baron Camelford =

Barony in the Peerage of Great Britain

Arms of Pitt: Sable, a fesse chequy argent and azure between three bezants

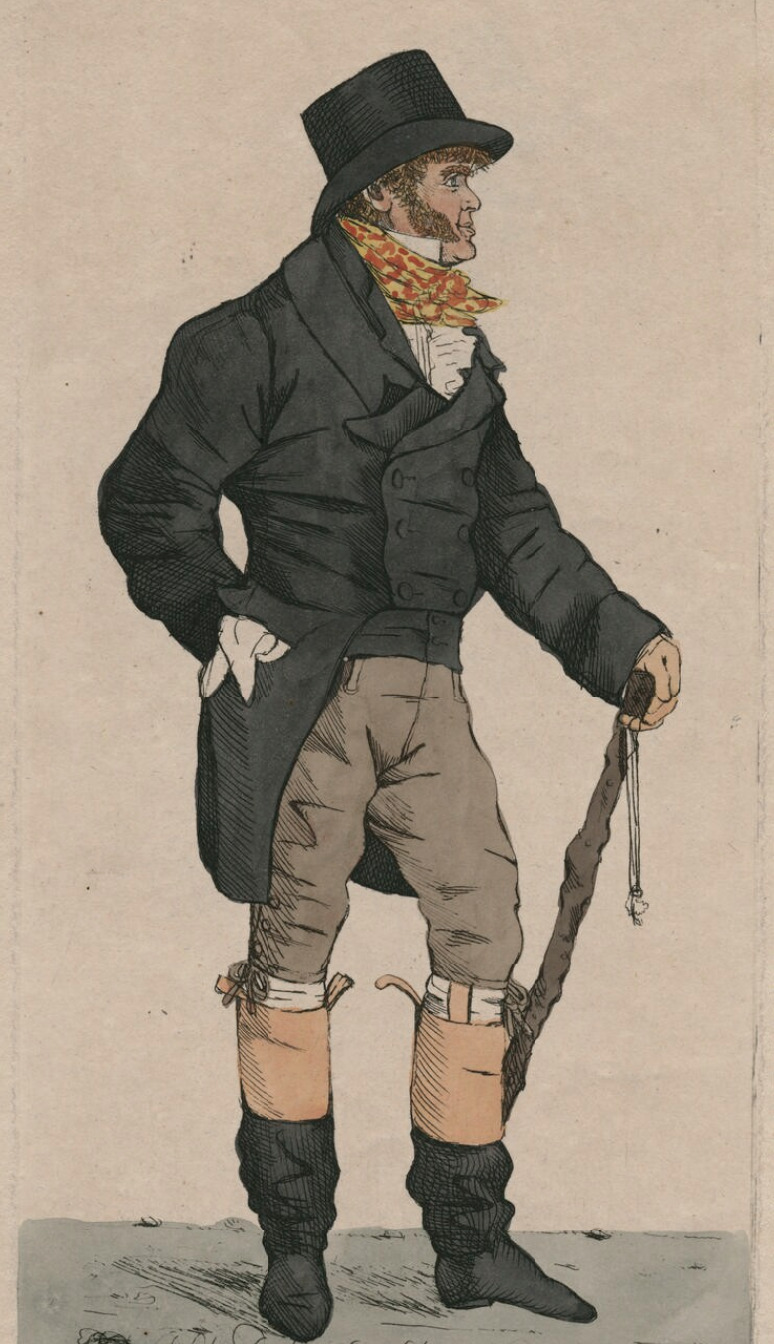
1804 portrait of Thomas Pitt, 2nd Baron Camelford by Robert Dighton Jr.

Baron Camelford, of Boconnoc, in the County of Cornwall, was a title in the Peerage of Great Britain. It was created, as Lord Camelford, Baron of Boconnoc, on 5 January 1784 for Thomas Pitt, who had previously represented Old Sarum and Okehampton in Parliament. A member of the famous Pitt family, he was the eldest son of Thomas Pitt of Boconnoc; a great-grandson of Thomas Pitt, President of Madras, who purchased Boconnoc House; a great-nephew of Thomas Pitt, 1st Earl of Londonderry; a nephew of William Pitt, 1st Earl of Chatham and first cousin of William Pitt the Younger. Lord Camelford was also the father-in-law of William Grenville, 1st Baron Grenville. The title became extinct on the death of his only son, the 2nd Baron, who was killed in a duel in 1804.

== Barons Camelford (1784) ==
- Thomas Pitt, 1st Baron Camelford (1737–1793)
- Thomas Pitt, 2nd Baron Camelford (1775–1804)

== See also ==
- Earl of Londonderry (1726 creation)
- Earl of Chatham
