= Nicholas Kendall (Royalist) =

English politician and Royalist

Nicholas Kendall (c. 1577–1643) was an English politician who sat in the House of Commons in 1625 and 1640. He was killed in action fighting on the Royalist side in the English Civil War.

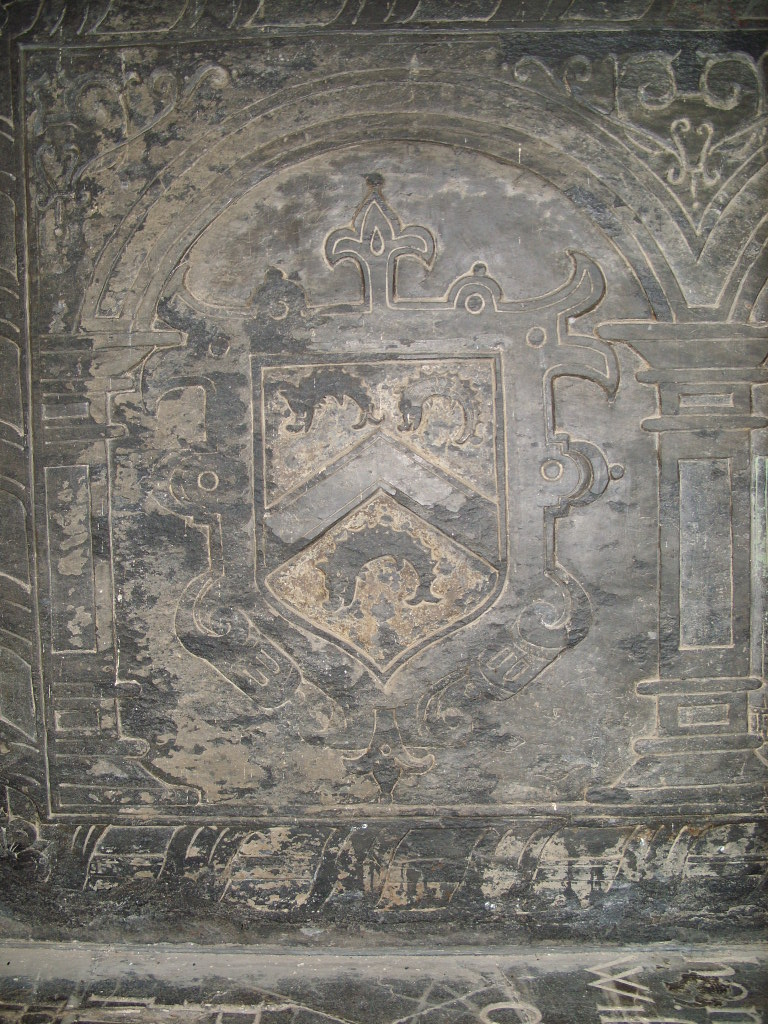
Coat of arms of the Kendall family of Pelyn in Cornwall.

Kendall was the son of Walter Kendall of Pelyn, Cornwall. He matriculated at Exeter College, Oxford in October 1594 aged 17. He became recorder of Lostwithiel.

In 1625, Kendall was elected Member of Parliament for Lostwithiel in a double return. He was elected again as MP for Lostwithiel in April 1640 for the Short Parliament.

Kendall became a colonel in the King's army. He led a troop of Royalist soldiers into Bodmin, where they routed the Parliamentarian troopers who were raiding the town. He was killed at the siege of Bristol in 1643. He was buried in St Brevita's Church, Lanlivery.

Kendall married by Emlyn Treffrey, daughter of Thomas Treffrey of Lostwithiel. Their son Walter was also MP for Lostwithiel.

Parliament of England
Preceded by Sir John Hobart, 2nd Baronet; Sir John Chichester	Member of Parliament for Lostwithiel; 1625; With: Sir Henry Fane; Sir George Chudleigh, 1st Baronet; Reginald Mohun	Succeeded by Sir Edward Mansell; Reginald Mohun
Vacant Parliament suspended since 1629	Member of Parliament for Lostwithiel; 1640; With: Richard Arundell	Succeeded by John Trevanion; Richard Arundell
