= Warwick Mohun, 2nd Baron Mohun of Okehampton =

English politician

Warwick Mohun, 2nd Baron Mohun of Okehampton (25 May 1620 – 1665) was an English politician who sat in the House of Commons in 1640 until he inherited his peerage and sat in the House of Lords.

Mohun was the son of John Mohun, 1st Baron Mohun of Okehampton and his wife Cordelia Stanhope, daughter of Sir John Stanhope. In April 1640, Mohun was elected Member of Parliament for Grampound in the Short Parliament in what appeared to be a double return. He inherited the Barony on the death of his father on 28 March 1641.

On the outbreak of the English Civil War Mohun left Westminster and retired to his house in Cornwall. He eventually took up arms for the Royalist cause in September 1642 and raised a regiment of foot in his own area in spite of his unpopularity there. He resigned his commission a year later. He was fined for delinquency although the disputes about the amount to be paid lasted a long time.

Mohun died between April and July 1665 at the age of 45.

Mohun married Catherine Welles of Brember in Hampshire and had two sons and three daughters.

Parliament of England
Parliament suspended since 1629	Member of Parliament for Grampound; 1640; With: John Trevanion; William Coryton	Succeeded by William Coryton; James Campbell
Peerage of England
Preceded by John Mohun	Baron Mohun of Okehampton; 1640–1665	Succeeded by Charles Mohun
