= John Craufurd (MP, died 1814) =

British politician (died 1814)

John Craufurd (c. 1742–1814) of Errol, Perth and Kinross, was a British politician who sat in the House of Commons between 1768 and 1790.

== Early life ==
Craufurd was the son of Patrick Craufurd of Auchenames, Renfrew, and Crosbie and Drumsoy, Ayr and his wife Elizabeth Middleton, daughter of George Middleton of Errol, Perth and Kinross. He was educated at Eton College from 1753 to 1757 where he was nicknamed 'The Fish' for his avid curiosity. There, he was a schoolfellow of Stephen Fox. He entered Glasgow University in 1757 and undertook a Grand Tour with Fox from 1760 to 1761. Through Fox he became an intimate of the Holland House circle. After his tour he made annual visits abroad and was as well known in French as in English society. He was a small man with a weak physique but exceptionally intelligent. His temperament was mercurial swinging between poles of gaiety, wit and restless activity on one hand and melancholy, hypochondria and indolence on the other. He was a notorious gambler and in 1764 was one of the early members of Almack's. He hoped to succeed his uncle Col. John Craufurd as MP for Berwick but was disappointed. He spent most of 1765 with Horace Walpole and David Hume in Paris, and formed an attachment to Madame du Deffand, whose devotion to her 'petit Craufurd' lasted many years. Early in 1766 he went home deep in debt. He managed to pacify his angry father by 'prudence, management and submission', and persuaded him to make over to him the revenues of the Errol estate. Considering Scotland as 'a vile country' where 'neither love nor wit can flourish', he became bored in the company of his father and returned to fashionable London life. He was cultivating Grafton's favour on behalf of his father and himself at the next election.

== Political career ==
Craufurd hoped for a seat at Stockbridge but it fell through. He went to Bath obsessed by his health and later went to Paris with Lord March and G. A. Selwyn, in a bored and despondent mood. He kept in touch with political changes, and maintained contact with Shelburne and with Grafton, who, shortly after Craufurd's return home in December, offered him the place of Chamberlain of Fife and Strathearn which he held from 1767 to his death. He also obtained from Thomas Pitt the promise of a seat at Old Sarum and in addition proposed to contest Renfrew in place of his father. In the 1768 general election he was elected Member of Parliament for Old Sarum Shortly after his election Craufurd had a dispute with Grafton and considered 'throwing up' his place, but was dissuaded by Hume. He gave up speaking in Parliament after his speech in support of a Government bill concerning the East India Company on 18 December 1768. He said "It was a prepared speech, ill-timed, ill-received, ill-delivered, languid, plaintive, and everything as bad as possible. Add to this, that it was very long, because being prepared and pompously begun, I did not know how the devil to get out of it ... The only thing I said which was sensible or to the purpose, was misrepresented by Edmund Burke. Certainly it was not the intention of nature that I should be a public speaker and I shall never attempt it any more".

During the recess in 1771 he remained at home for once, where he persuaded his father to give him full possession of Errol. Mme du Deffand commented: "Il n’en est pas plus riche mais son credit en augmente et il aura la satisfaction de se pouvoir ruiner." In the House his attendance was erratic. He later became concerned about his father's determination to curb expenditure and entail all the family estates. He consulted William Mure on this and on his election prospects, particularly as Sir Lawrence Dundas had offered to bring him in elsewhere if he failed in Renfrewshire. He showed considerable skill in election intrigue in Renfrewshire, Ayrshire, and Perthshire, in the 1774 British general election and was returned as MP for Renfrewshire.

In 1775 Craufurd induced Lord North to give him life tenure of his post as Chamberlain of Fife, hitherto held at pleasure. Shortly afterwards his absurd behaviour became as notorious as his gambling. He plagued his friends with his imaginary ailments, his 'ennui and jealousies', with requests to pay his debts 'pour le delivrer des Juifs', 'gate-crashed' parties, but seldom attended when invited. Selwyn wrote in December 1775 'I think verily he grows more tiresome every day, and everybody's patience is à bout.' At the 1780 general election, he was faced by a combination against him at Renfrewshire and withdrew. With the support of the Hamilton and Argyll interest he transferred to Glasgow Burghs where he was returned.

In the new Parliament he continued to keep a foot in each camp. Having sold his estates of Errol and Drumsoy, he was now well funded and renewed his solicitations on behalf of his brother James Craufurd. In May he was toadying to Lord North, but in July, when he had received nothing, he "took occasion to say everything disagreeable to Lord North that one could well imagine". Selwyn wrote in October 1781 "That abominable cortigiano-ism with his affected disinterestedness and noblesse d'âme make him intolerable." When he was in a quandary Craufurd usually made illness his excuse. Before the motion of censure against the Admiralty, Selwyn wrote "I hope that Government will send two yeomen of the guard to carry the Fish down in his blankets, for he pretends to have the gout ... He should be deposited ... and be fairly asked his opinion and forced to give it one way or the other en pleine assemblée."

In 1784 in the expectation of a dissolution, Craufurd was planning to stand for Ayrshire as well as for Renfrewshire and Glasgow, and to put his brother in for the former and some friend in for the latter. When no immediate dissolution took place, he fell 'ill' and went to Bath. In the event, at the 1784 general election he did not attempt Renfrewshire, he had little chance in Ayrshire and he lost his seat at Glasgow Burghs.

Craufurd did not contest an Ayrshire by-election of 1789. Coutts commented "I do not imagine he thinks of Ayr or Renfrew any more. Politics is by no means his natural bent; yet had he taken a public line early, few have better abilities." Glasgow Burghs fell vacant in 1790 and Craufurd won back his old seat in a by-election on 26 February 1790. After a few months, he lost it again at the 1790 general election and his bid for Dysart Burghs also failed.

== Later life ==
Soon after losing his seat, Craufurd fell seriously ill. In 1792 he went to Paris but was horrified by revolutionary excesses and returned home. Thereafter he did not try to re-enter Parliament and abandoned his Foxite friends. He died on 26 May 1814.

Parliament of Great Britain
Preceded by Thomas Pitt (the younger); Howell Gwynne	Member of Parliament for Old Sarum; 1768–1774; With: William Gerard Hamilton	Succeeded by Pinckney Wilkinson; Thomas Pitt (the younger)
Preceded by William Macdowall	Member of Parliament for Renfrewshire; 1774–1780	Succeeded by John Shaw-Stewart
Preceded by Lord Frederick Campbell	Member of Parliament for Glasgow Burghs; 1780–1784	Succeeded by Ilay Campbell
Preceded by Ilay Campbell	Member of Parliament for Glasgow Burghs; 1790–1790	Succeeded by William McDowall
