= Couch's Mill =

Hamlet in Cornwall, England

Coordinates: 50.401°N 4.604°W

Couch's Mill: Cornish: Melincouch
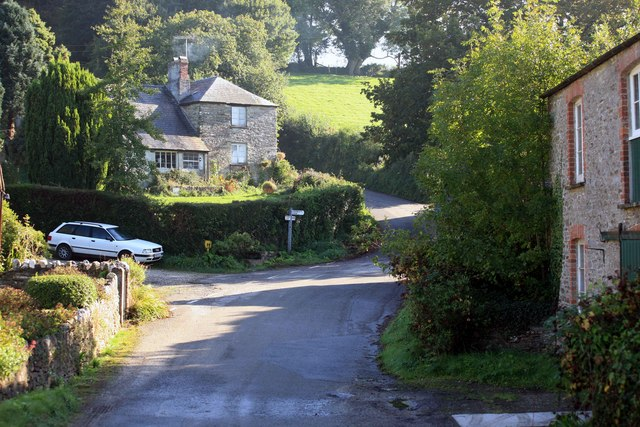
- Couch's Mill

- Location within Cornwall
- OS grid reference: SX1460
- Civil parish: Boconnoc
- Unitary authority: Cornwall
- Ceremonial county: Cornwall
- Region: South West
- Country: England
- Sovereign state: United Kingdom
- Post town: LOSTWITHIEL
- Postcode district: PL22
- Dialling code: 01208; 01503
- Police: Devon and Cornwall
- Fire: Cornwall
- Ambulance: South Western
- UK Parliament: South East Cornwall

Couch's Mill (Cornish: Melincouch, meaning the Couch family mill) is a small hamlet in east Cornwall, England, United Kingdom. It is in the parish of Boconnoc, a large private estate that borders the hamlet to the north.

== Location ==
Couch's Mill lies roughly 4 miles (6.4 km) from the centre of the nearest town, Lostwithiel, and about 1.5 miles (2.4 km) from the nearby village Lerryn.

== Name ==
The true format in which to write the name seems not to have been decided. Even local signposts vary. The three different ways commonly found of writing the name of the hamlet are Couchs Mill, Couch's Mill and Couches Mill. These are all deemed correct, although the last variation is less commonly found, and generally less accepted.

The actor Nigel Havers discovered in the programme Who Do You Think You Are?, broadcast in 2013, that he is descended from the Couch family who operated the mill in the 19th century.
