= Richard Lyttelton =

British Army general

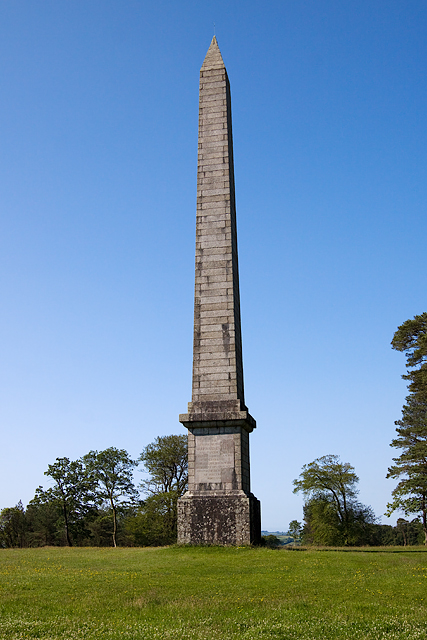
Obelisk erected to the memory of Sir Richard Lyttelton at Boconnoc in 1771 by his nephew Thomas Pitt, 1st Baron Camelford. Inscribed:In gratitude and affection to the memory of Sir Richard Lyttelton and to perpetuate that peculiar character of benevolence which rendered him the delight of his own age and worthy of the veneration of posterity MDCCLXXI

Lieutenant-General Sir Richard Lyttelton KB (1718 – 1 October 1770) was a British soldier and politician who served in the British Army.

He was the fourth son of Sir Thomas Lyttelton, 4th Baronet. He served as Governor of Menorca from 1763 until 1766 after its restoration to British rule following the fall of Menorca to the French in 1756 – later returning to Britain where he died in 1770. He was also Governor of Guernsey.

He was the younger brother of George Lyttelton, 1st Baron Lyttelton, a leading MP and a friend of William Pitt, and the uncle of Thomas Lyttelton, 2nd Baron Lyttelton and Thomas Pitt, 1st Baron Camelford, MP.

Lyttelton married Rachel, Duchess of Bridgewater (widow of Scroop Egerton, 1st Duke of Bridgewater) on 14 December 1745. He was an employer of John Burrows, a physician who served as his secretary in Menorca, and later made groundbreaking research into venereal disease.

His nephew Thomas Pitt, 1st Baron Camelford, son of his sister Christian, erected an obelisk to his memory in 1771 at the family seat at Boconnoc.

== See also ==
- List of governors of Menorca

== Bibliography ==
- Black, Jeremy. Pitt the Elder. Cambridge University Press, 1992.
- Linda E. Merians (ed). The Secret Malady. Medical, 1996

Parliament of Great Britain
Preceded by Sir Paul Methuen; Sewallis Shirley	Member of Parliament for Brackley; 1747–1754; With: Sewallis Shirley	Succeeded by Marshe Dickinson; Thomas Humberston
Preceded by Joseph Gulston; George Trenchard	Member of Parliament for Poole; 1754–1761; With: Joseph Gulston	Succeeded by Joseph Gulston; Thomas Calcraft
Military offices
Preceded by Louis-Félicien de Boffin d'Argenson et Pusignieu	Governor of Menorca; 1763–1766	Succeeded by George Howard
Preceded by The Earl De La Warr	Governor of Guernsey; 1766–1770	Succeeded by Sir Jeffrey Amherst
