= Thomas Pitt, 1st Baron Camelford =

British politician

The Right Honourable The Lord Camelford
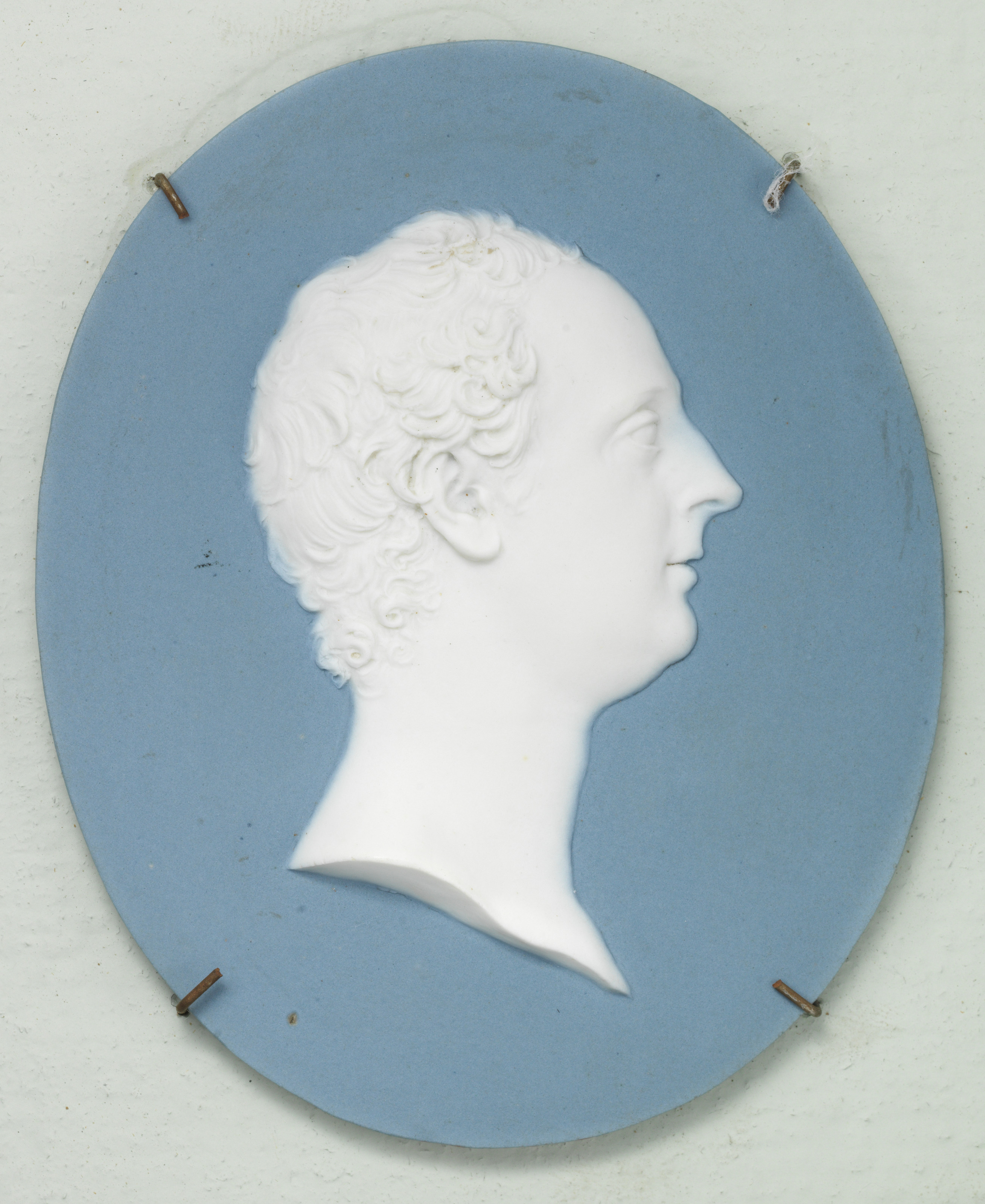
- Wedgwood jasperware miniature, c. 1780

Personal details
- Born: 3 March 1737 Boconnoc, Cornwall, England
- Died: 19 January 1793 (aged 55) Florence, Italy
- Resting place: Boconnoc, Cornwall
- Spouse: Anne Wilkinson (m. 1771)
- Children: Thomas Pitt, 2nd Baron Camelford; Anne Grenville, Baroness Grenville
- Parent(s): Thomas Pitt of Boconnoc; Christian Lyttelton
- Relatives: William Pitt the Elder (uncle)
- Education: Clare College, Cambridge
- Occupation: Politician

Thomas Pitt, 1st Baron Camelford (3 March 1737 – 19 January 1793) was a British politician who sat in the House of Commons from 1761 until 1784 when he was raised to the peerage as Baron Camelford. He was an art connoisseur.

== Early life ==
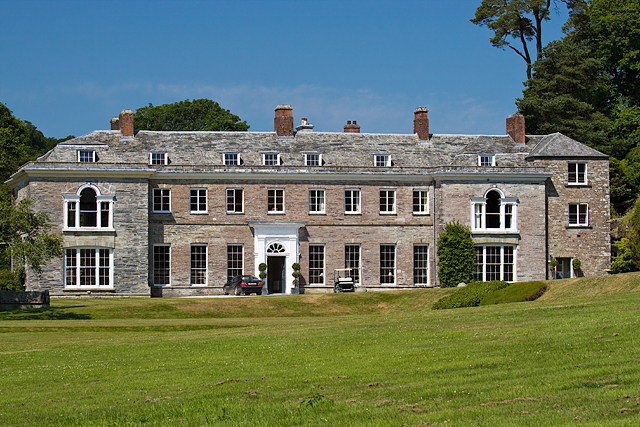
Boconnoc House

Pitt was born and baptised at Boconnoc in Cornwall on 3 March 1737, the son of Thomas Pitt of Boconnoc (died 1761), elder brother of William Pitt the Elder. His mother was Christian, eldest daughter of Thomas Lyttelton, 4th Baronet, of Hagley. He was admitted fellow-commoner at Clare College, Cambridge, on 7 January 1754, and resided there until 1758. In 1759 Pitt obtained the degree of Master of Arts (MA) per literas regias.

Thomas Pitt accompanied Thomas Hay, 9th Earl of Kinnoull, British ambassador to the court of Portugal, on his journey to Lisbon in January 1760. Thomas Gray and his friends contrived that John Bowes, 9th Earl of Strathmore and Kinghorne, a college companion, should go with him; and Philip Francis, a lifelong friend, also joined the expedition. They entered the Tagus on 7 March 1760, and left Lisbon on 21 May 1760. Passing through Spain to Barcelona, they crossed to Genoa, and passed some time in Italy. Pitt corresponded with Gray, and wrote a manuscript journal of his travels; Cole notes that the description of the bullfight in the manuscript is identical with that in Edward Clarke's Letters on the Spanish Nation. Horace Walpole introduced Pitt to Sir Horace Mann at Florence, and praised his conduct in cutting off the entail to pay his father's debts and to provide for his sisters. Pitt was staying at Florence with his uncle, Richard Lyttelton, when news arrived of the death of his father, on 17 July 1761.

== In politics ==
Thomas Pitt now became owner of the controlling interest in the rotten borough of Old Sarum and a considerable share in that of Okehampton in Devon. At intervals, Pitt now played an active part in politics. He was a Member of Parliament of the House of Commons for Old Sarum from December 1761 until 1768, for Okehampton from 1768 until 1774, and again for Old Sarum from 1774 until he was raised to the peerage in 1784. He followed in politics his near relative, George Grenville, who made him a lord of the admiralty in his ministry of 1763. He was invited, in compliment to his uncle, Chatham, to continue in office with the Rockingham ministry; but he was politically at variance with Chatham, and followed Grenville into opposition.

Pitt was one of the seventy-two whig members who met at the Thatched House Tavern, London, on 9 May 1769, to celebrate the rights of electors in the struggle for the representation of Middlesex; he seconded Sir William Meredith in his attempt to relax the subscription to the Thirty-nine Articles, and he spoke against the Royal Marriage Bill. Through his influence, supported by Lady Chatham, the reconciliation of his uncle and Richard Grenville-Temple, 2nd Earl Temple was effected in 1774. Horace Walpole, who quarrelled with him on political topics, calls him a 'flimsy' speaker, but Wraxall remarked that, although he rarely spoke, his family position guaranteed him an audience when he did. He made a speech in 1780 on John Dunning's motion to limit the influence of the Crown. He was one of the strongest opponents of Lord North's ministry, and a warm antagonist of the coalition. In November 1781, he protested against voting supplies until grievances were redressed. In February 1783, he moved the address for the Shelburne ministry, protesting that he had always been opposed to the use of force against the American colonies, and he attacked Charles James Fox's East India Bill.

He spoke carefully in 1782 against parliamentary reform. Next year, when the same question was brought forward, he was ridiculed for a change of opinion, and his offer to sacrifice his rotten borough for the public good. He was satirised by the authors of the Rolliad (1795), and was chaffed in the House of Commons by Fox (13 March 1784) and Edmund Burke (28 February 1785). In March 1783, when the king was endeavouring to form an administration in opposition to North and Fox, the leadership of the House of Commons and the seals of a secretary of state were offered to him, despite opposition from Lord Ashburton. On 5 January 1784 he was raised to the peerage as Baron Camelford of Boconnoc, a promotion attributed to the influence of his cousin William Pitt the Younger.

== Dilettante ==
From March 1762, Pitt lived at Twickenham, playfully calling his house the 'Palazzo Pitti', a punning reference to the Pitti Palace in Florence. He was then the neighbour of Horace Walpole of Strawberry Hill House, who recognised his skill in Gothic architecture, and went so far as to call him 'my present architect.' On the death in 1779 of William Stanhope, 2nd Earl of Harrington, he bought the lease of Petersham Lodge (beneath Richmond Park, but now demolished and the grounds included in the park boundaries), and he purchased the fee-simple in 1784 from the crown, an act of parliament being passed for that purpose. In 1790 it was sold by him to the Duke of Clarence.

Thomas Pitt also built Camelford House, fronting Oxford Street, at the top of Park Lane, London; and as a member of the Dilettanti Society, to which he had been elected on 1 May 1763, he proposed in February 1785 that the shells of two adjoining houses constructed by him in Hereford Street should be completed by the society for a public museum, but financial considerations put a stop to the project. Although an amateur, Pitt was involved in architecture at the highest level, particularly at Stowe House in Buckinghamshire during the period 1770–1779. Earl Temple having first obtained a design from Jacques-François Blondel for the new south front of the house, which did not meet with the Earl's approval, in 1771 Robert Adam produced a new design for the south front; this design was adapted and made more uniform by Thomas Pitt assisted by Giovanni Battista Borra and was finished in 1779. The interiors of the new state apartments were not completed until 1788, much of the interior work being by an Italian, Vincenzo Valdrè (1740–1814).

Pitt interested himself in the porcelain manufactory of Plymouth porcelain, where they used the white saponaceous china stone found on his land in Cornwall. Angelica Kauffman wrote to him on the free importation into England by artists of their own studies and designs. Pitt was a friend of Mary Delany, to whom he gave for her lifetime portraits of Sir Bevil Grenville, his wife, and his father, and he proposed to John Maurice, Count of Brühl that they should jointly assist Thomas Mudge in his plans for the improvement of nautical chronometers. The wainscoting of the stalls in Carlisle Cathedral, where his uncle Charles Lyttelton was bishop, was designed by him.

== Later years ==
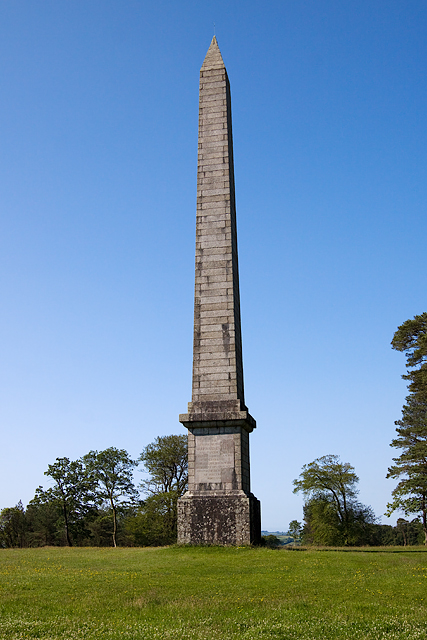
The obelisk, Boconnoc Estate

From 1789 to 1792 he was in Italy, and, although he landed at Deal in June 1792, he left for continental Europe again in September. Peter Beckford says in his 'Familiar Letters' (1805 edit. i. 159), that Lord Camelford 'left Florence for Pisa with the gout upon him, and died immediately on his arrival;’ but it is generally said that he died at Florence on 19 January 1793. He was buried on 2 March at Boconnoc, where he had added to the old mansion, from his own designs, a second wing and gallery. In 1771, he had erected, on the hill above the house, an obelisk, 123 feet high, to the memory of his uncle, Sir Richard Lyttelton.

== Attributed works ==
Some tracts have been attributed to Camelford. Sir John Sinclair credits him with a reply to his own 'Lucubrations during a Short Recess,’ 1782 . A few days after his elevation to the peerage a pamphlet, in which 'the constitutional right of the House of Commons to advise the sovereign' was upheld, was attributed to Camelford, and referred to in parliament by Burke, who also ridiculed him as the alleged author of a tract relating to parliamentary reform. In the autumn of 1789 Camelford found it necessary to deny that he had published a treatise on French affairs. He is included in Park's edition of Walpole's 'Royal and Noble Authors,’ iv. 348–50, as 'the reputed author of a tract concerning the American war.'

== Family ==
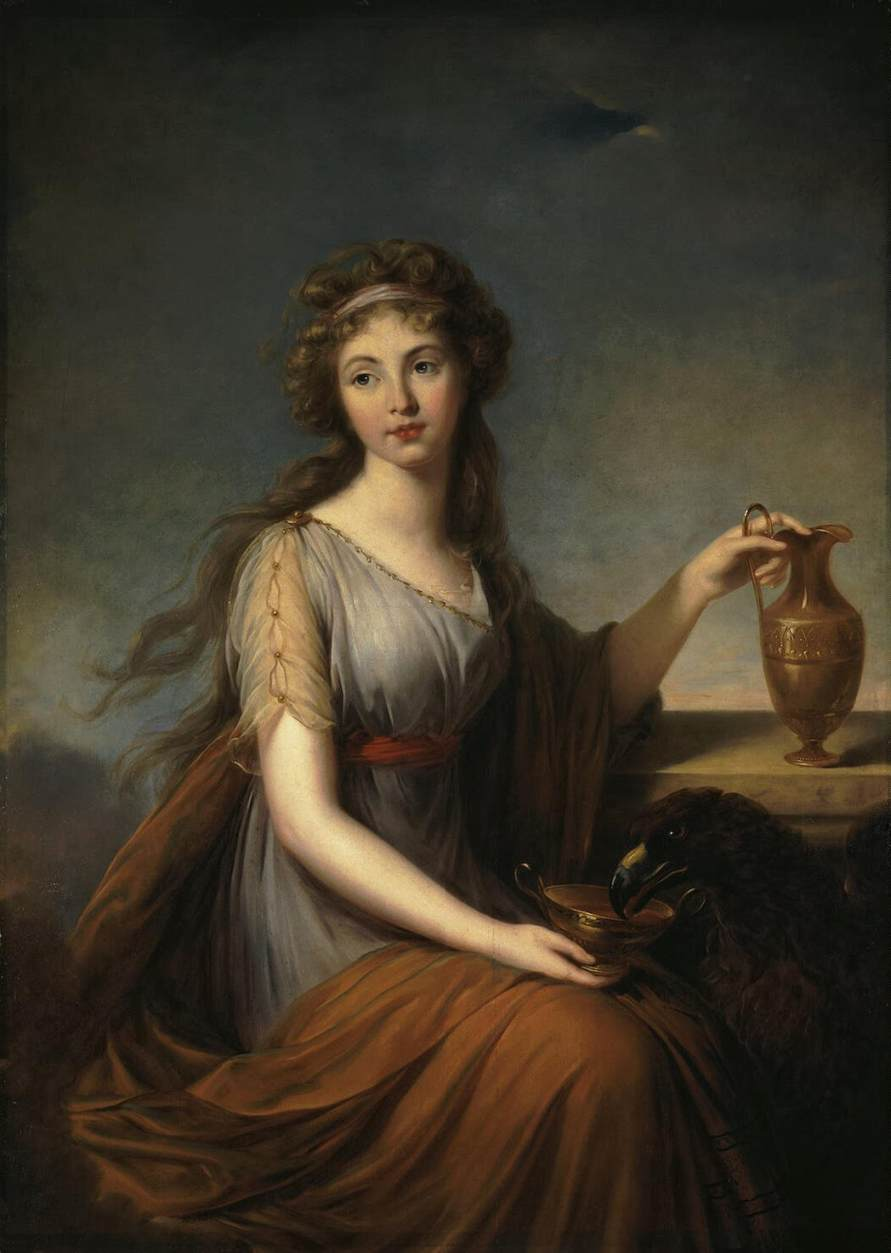
Anne Pitt as Hebe by Élisabeth Vigée Le Brun. His daughter, the wife of a future Prime Minister Lord Grenville, painted in Rome in 1792

In July 1771, Pitt married Anne Wilkinson, the younger daughter and coheiress of Pinckney Wilkinson, a rich merchant of Hanover Square, London, and Burnham Westgate, Norfolk. She died at Camelford House, Oxford Street, London, on 5 May 1803, aged 65, pining from grief at the career of her son, and was buried in the vault in Boconnoc churchyard on 19 May. Anne's sister Mary made an unhappy marriage, in 1760, with Captain John Smith, by whom she was mother of Admiral Sir Sidney Smith – Thomas Pitt treated his sister-in-law and her children with much kindness and in 1785 printed a 'Narrative and Proofs' of Smith's bad conduct.

Thomas and Anne had two children:

- Thomas Pitt, later 2nd Baron Camelford
- Anne Pitt (September 1772 – 1864)

Hester Thrale described Pitt as 'a finical, lady-like man' and Sir J. Eardley-Wilmot dubbed him in 1765 'the prince of all the male beauties,’ and 'very well bred, polite, and sensible'. In his biography of Horace Walpole, Timothy Mowl took these comments to claim Pitt was a homosexual.

== See also ==
- Conway's Bridge

Parliament of Great Britain
Preceded by Thomas Pitt; Howell Gwynne	Member of Parliament for Old Sarum; 1761–1768; With: Howell Gwynne	Succeeded by William Gerard Hamilton; John Craufurd
Preceded by Alexander Forrester; Wenman Coke	Member of Parliament for Okehampton; 1768–1774; With: Thomas Brand 1768–1770; Richard Fitzpatrick 1770–1774	Succeeded by Richard Vernon; Alexander Wedderburn
Preceded by William Gerard Hamilton; John Craufurd	Member of Parliament for Old Sarum; 1774–1784; With: Pinckney Wilkinson	Succeeded by Pinckney Wilkinson; John Villiers
Peerage of Great Britain
New creation	Baron Camelford; 1784–1793	Succeeded by Thomas Pitt
