= John Mohun, 1st Baron Mohun of Okehampton =

English politician

John Mohun, 1st Baron Mohun of Okehampton (1595 – 28 March 1641) was an English politician.

== Life ==
He was the eldest son of Sir Reginald Mohun, 1st Baronet, and was educated at Exeter College, Oxford, graduating in 1608, and joining the Middle Temple. In the Parliaments of 1624–25 and 1625, he sat as MP for the Cornish borough of Grampound; he was a follower of the Duke of Buckingham, and it was probably through Buckingham's influence that he was appointed Vice-Warden of the Stannaries in 1620. During 1626 and 1627, he was a member of a number of several commissions in the South-West, including one which inquired into the conduct of Sir John Eliot as Vice Admiral of Devon.

At the election for the Parliament of 1628, Buckingham and his agent in the South-West, Sir James Bagg, were anxious to prevent Eliot and another of the most effective opponents of the Crown, William Coryton, from being elected Members for Cornwall. They chose Mohun as one of their alternative candidates, but the campaign was unsuccessful. Further, the campaigning was so extreme by the standards of the time that a Commons committee was set up to investigate, and Mohun was summoned to appear at the Bar of the House. However, Bagg had been trying for months to persuade the King to raise Mohun to the peerage, and his efforts now bore fruit (which not only demonstrated the King's endorsement of the efforts of his supporters in the election, but also put Mohun outside the immediate jurisdiction of the Commons as they could not arrest a member of the House of Lords). Mohun was created Baron Mohun of Okehampton on 15 April 1628.

Mohun's elevation to the peerage, however, could not entirely protect him from the efforts of his enemy, Sir John Eliot. Eliot succeeded in having a committee appointed to investigate Mohun's record as vice-warden of the Stannaries: the committee brought formal charges against him and a conference of the Lords and Commons convened to hear them. But the death of Eliot's wife intervened, and with its chief mover otherwise preoccupied the matter was allowed to drop.

But Mohun's disposition ensured further disputes. In 1633, he publicly quarrelled with another peer at the christening of the Duke of York. In 1634, he fell out with his former ally Bagg, and charged him in the Star Chamber of cheating the King out of £20,000. The case rumbled on for some years before the King was able to suppress it and fine Mohun for "undue inquiries into his majesty's debts".

Lord Mohun died on 28 May 1640.

== Family ==
Mohun married Cordelia Aston, daughter of Sir John Stanhope and widow of Sir Roger Aston. He succeeded to the baronetcy on his father's death in 1639, and the two titles both passed to his second but oldest surviving son, Warwick. (They remained merged until they both became extinct on the death of the 4th Baron on 15 November 1712.)

== Notes ==
Attribution

- This article incorporates text from a publication now in the public domain: Courtney, William Prideaux (1894). "Mohun, John Mohun, John (1592?-1640)". In Lee, Sidney (ed.). Dictionary of National Biography. Vol. 38. London: Smith, Elder & Co.

Parliament of England
| Preceded by John Hampden; Sir Robert Carey | Member of Parliament for Grampound; 1624–1625; With: Richard Edgcumbe 1624–1625; Sir Samuel Rolle 1625 | Succeeded by Edward Thomas; Thomas St Aubyn |
Peerage of England
| New creation | Baron Mohun of Okehampton; 1628–1640 | Succeeded by Warwick Mohun |
Baronetage of England
| Preceded by Reginald Mohun | Baronet (of Boconnoc); 1639–1640 | Succeeded by Warwick Mohun |
