= Boconnoc =

Civil parish in Cornwall, England

Coordinates: 50.416°N 4.611°W

Boconnoc: Cornish: Boskennek
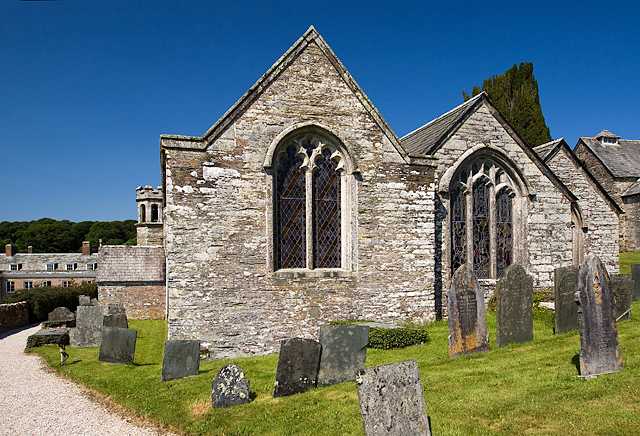

- Location within Cornwall
- Population: 122 (Parish, 2011)
- OS grid reference: SX147607
- Unitary authority: Cornwall
- Ceremonial county: Cornwall
- Region: South West
- Country: England
- Sovereign state: United Kingdom
- Post town: LOSTWITHIEL
- Postcode district: PL22
- Dialling code: 01503
- Police: Devon and Cornwall
- Fire: Cornwall
- Ambulance: South Western
- UK Parliament: South East Cornwall

Boconnoc (Cornish: Boskennek) is a civil parish in Cornwall, England, United Kingdom, approximately four miles (6 km) east of the town of Lostwithiel. According to the 2011 census the parish had a population of 96.

The parish is rural in character and is fairly well wooded. It is bordered to the west by St Winnow parish, to the south by St Veep parish, to the southeast and east by Lanreath parish, and to the north by Braddock parish. The hamlets of Couch's Mill and Brooks are in the parish. Part of ancient deer park at Boconnoc House contains an internationally important assemblage of lichens and is one of the most important sites in Europe for lichens.

== History ==
There are Cornish crosses in the churchyard, on Druids' Hill and in Boconnoc Park. The latter cross was removed to here from Lanlivery and has some curious incised ornament.

The manor of Boconnoc is listed in the Domesday Book of 1086 as Bochenod, and was then one of the many hundred possessions of Robert, Count of Mortain, the half-brother of King William the Conqueror. Robert's tenant was a Briton named as "Offers", elsewhere in the Domesday Book named "Offels, Offerd, Offers, Osfert, Osfertus", and now known as "Osfrith of Okehampton" in Devon. In 1086 Osfrith held in total 12 manors in Devon and Cornwall, and before the Norman Conquest of 1066 had held 20. The holder in 1268 was De Cant.

=== Carminow ===
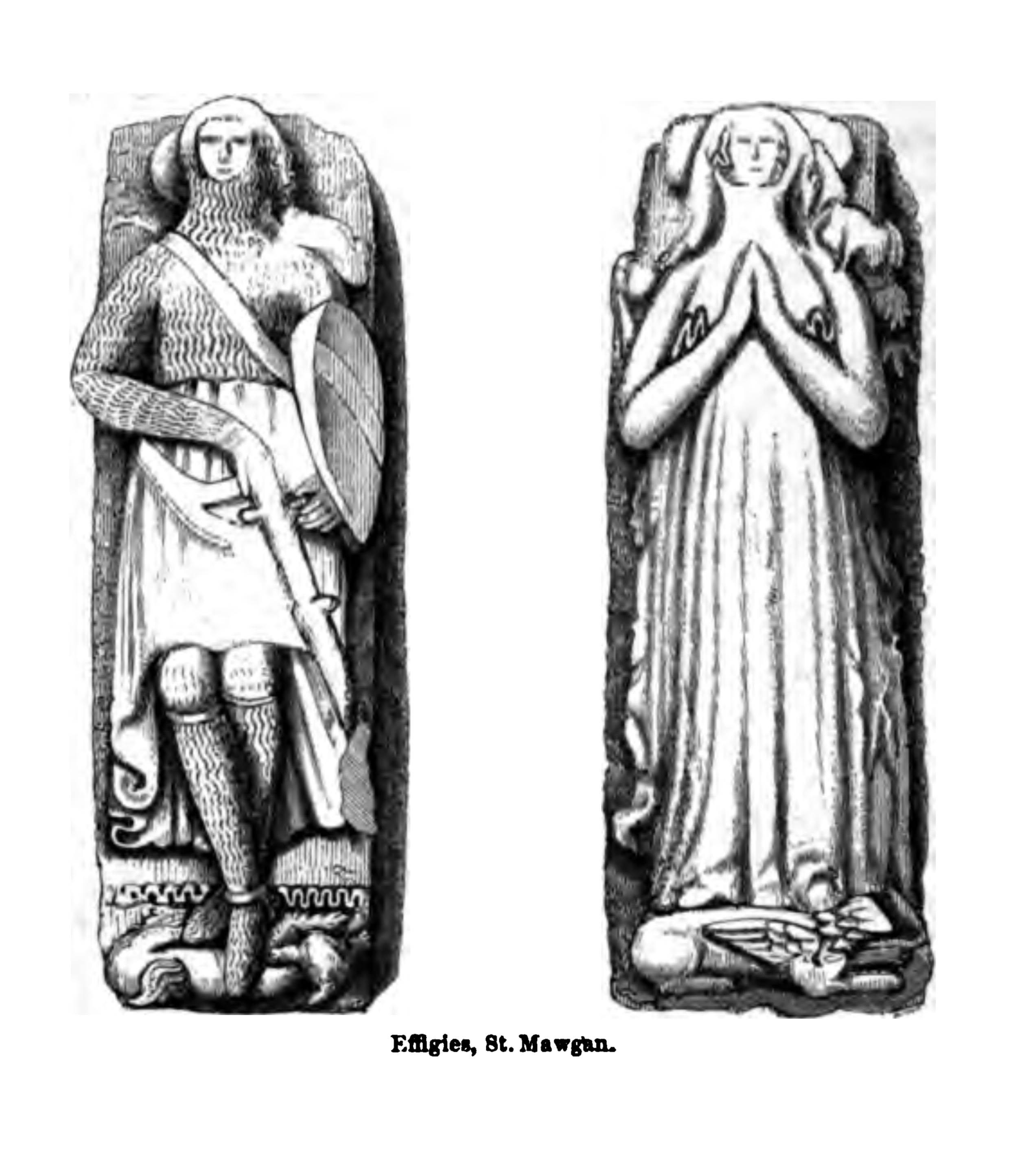
Effigies of Roger Carminow (d.1308) and his wife Joan Dinham in the church of St Mawgan-in-Meneage, Cornwall. In the cross-legged pose supposed to represent crusaders, he displays on his shield the arms of Carminow: Azure, a bend or

arms of Carminow: Azure, a bend or

At some point Boconnoc came into the possession of the Carminow family, who originated in the Cornish parish of Mawgan in Meneage. The church there contains stone effigies of Roger Carminow (died 1308) in armour beside his wife Joan Dinham, daughter of Oliver Dinham (died 1299), 1st Baron. He is said to have fought under King Edward I in his wars in Scotland and to have served as Member of Parliament for Cornwall in 1300. His son Sir John Carminow (died 1341) married Joan Glyn (died 1349), daughter of Sir John Glyn, and their son was Sir Walter Carminow, who married Alice Tintern, daughter of Sir Stephen Tintern, of St Tudy. They had two sons, the elder being Sir Ralph Carminow (died 1386), who sat three times as MP for Cornwall, in 1383, 1384 and 1386, but left no surviving children.

Some details of Sir Ralph's time at Boconnoc can be found in the “History of Parliament”. In the 1370s he and his brother petitioned Edward the Black Prince, as Duke of Cornwall and his father King Edward III of England against John Sergeaux, husband of his wife’s sister, alleging that Sergeaux had sent men to Boconnoc, viciously assaulted him and his wife, removed 200 pounds worth of goods, and left him for dead. While serving as sheriff of Cornwall, Sergeaux then launched a second effort to obtain the property by an attachment order, taking more of his possessions to an alleged value of 1,000 pounds.

On a visitation of the diocese in 1371, Bishop Thomas Brantingham of Exeter found that Sir Ralph and his first wife Catherine Champernowne were living as husband and wife illegally, their marriage being invalid in canon law as they were related in both the third and the fourth degrees of consanguinity. Summoned before the bishop in 1372, Sir Ralph presented letters he had obtained from the papal nuncio, Cardinal Simon Langham, granting the couple dispensation for the marriage.

In 1381 a royal commission found that William Botreaux, 1st Baron, hearing of the Peasants' Revolt in London, had gathered 80 men and broken into the park at Boconnoc, hunted the deer, killing 20 of them, and generally damaged the property. Botreaux’s wife appealed against the charge, saying that her husband was then on military service in Portugal and that the accusation against him was false. In 1383 Sir Ralph was one of 18 major landowners in Cornwall ordered to reside near the sea, in his case probably at Boconnoc which is at the head of the Fowey estuary, in order to provide prompt defence in case of French invasion.

He was supposed to be at Westminster for the opening of Parliament on 1 October 1386 but had not left Boconnoc by 9 October 1386, when he went out hunting with a pair of greyhounds, who pulled him to his death over the edge of a cliff (the fate of the dogs is not recorded).

The estate passed to his younger brother, Sir William Carminow (died 1407), Sheriff of Devon in 1391 and MP for Cornwall in 1407, who married Margaret Kelly (died 1420), and his heir was his son Thomas Carminow (died 1442), husband of Joan Hill, the daughter of Sir Robert Hill, of Shilstone in Modbury. They left two daughters, the elder being Margaret Carminow, who married first Sir John St Loe, secondly Wiliiam Botreaux, and thirdly Sir Hugh Courtenay (died 1471) who was executed after the Battle of Tewkesbury. Boconnoc then passed to his eldest son, Edward Courtenay, 1st Earl of Devon.

=== Courtenay ===
The Courtenay family, Earls of Devon, during the Wars of the Roses, showing the ancestry and descendants of Courtenay of Boconnoc

Sir Edward de Courtenay of Goodrington was the second son of Hugh de Courtenay, 2nd/10th Earl of Devon (1303–1377), of Tiverton Castle in Devon and of Okehampton Castle in Devon, feudal baron of Okehampton, and feudal baron of Plympton. By his wife Emeline Dauney he was the father of Edward de Courtenay, 3rd/11th Earl of Devon (1357–1419), "The Blind Earl", the ancestor of the 4th, 5th, 6th and 7th Earls, which senior line was extinguished during the Wars of the Roses, the last of whom was killed in the Battle of Tewkesbury in 1471. Sir Edward de Courtenay's second son (and therefore the brother of "The Blind Earl") was Sir Hugh Courtenay (1358-1425) of Haccombe in Devon, Sheriff of Devon for 1418/19 and thrice knight of the shire for Devon in 1395, 1397 and 1421, the grandfather of Edward Courtenay, 1st Earl of Devon (d.1509), KG, created Earl of Devon in 1485 by King Henry VII.

Sir Hugh Courtenay (1358-1425) inherited the manor of Haccombe from his heiress wife (his 2nd wife) Philippa Archdekne (alias Ercedecne), a daughter and co-heiress of Sir Warin Archdekne (1354-1400), MP. His son and heir by his 3rd wife Matilda Beaumont, was Sir Hugh Courtenay (d.1471) of Boconnoc, who married the heiress Margaret Carminowe. Boconnoc was visited by the antiquary William Worcester (1415-c.1482) who described the house then standing as "Blekennoc House, a turretted old mansion, lately the seat of Sir Hugh Courtenay".

It is believed that Boconnoc reverted to the crown in consequence of an attainder in the Courtenay family, and was later regranted to John Russell, 1st Earl of Bedford (c.1485-1555). It was sold in 1579 by Francis Russell, 2nd Earl of Bedford (1527–1585) to Sir William Mohun, who died seised of it in about 1587. Sir William Mohun was in any case one of the rightful co-heirs of the Courtenay family of Boconnoc.

Edward Courtenay, 1st Earl of Devon (c.1527-1556) was unmarried and childless at the time of his death. The manor and Castle of Tiverton and his other numerous estates devolved to his distant cousins, descended from the four sisters of his great-grandfather Edward Courtenay, 1st Earl of Devon (d.1509), all children of Sir Hugh Courtenay (d.1471) of Boconnoc and his wife, Margaret Carminow. These four sisters were as follows:

- Elizabeth Courtenay, wife of John Trethurffe of Trethurffe in the parish of Ladock, Cornwall.
- Maud Courtenay, wife of John Arundell of Talvern
- Isabel/Elizabeth Courtenay, wife of William Mohun of Hall in the parish of Lanteglos-by-Fowey in Cornwall, a descendant of John Mohun (d.1322) of Dunster Castle in Somerset, feudal baron of Dunster by his wife Anne Tiptoft. In 1628 her descendant John Mohun (1595–1641) was created by King Charles I Baron Mohun of Okehampton, his ancestor having inherited as his share Okehampton Castle and remnants of the feudal barony of Okehampton, one of the earliest possessions of the Courtenays. The Mohuns' held the manor of Boconnoc not (as might be expected) as a share of the Courtenay inheritance, but by lease from the Russell family, Earls of Bedford.
- Florence Courtenay, wife of John Trelawny

Thus the Courtenay estates were divided into four parts. On the death of Edward Courtenay, Earl of Devon, in 1556, the actual heirs to his estates were the following descendants of the four sisters above:

- Reginald Mohun (1507/8-67) of Hall in the parish of Lanteglos-by-Fowey in Cornwall, who inherited Okehampton Castle and had leased Boconnoc from the Earl of Bedford. His descendant was John Mohun, 1st Baron Mohun of Okehampton (1595–1641) who was elevated to the peerage by King Charles I as Baron Mohun of Okehampton, in recognition of his ancestor having inherited Okehampton Castle as his share of the Courtenay inheritance.
- Margaret Buller;
- John Vivian;
- John Trelawny;

=== Mohun ===
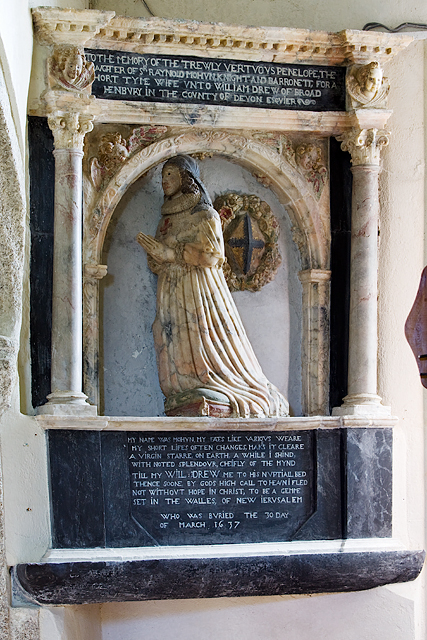
Mural monument with kneeling effigy, in Boconnoc Church, of Penelope Mohun (d.1637), a daughter of Sir Reginald Mohun, 1st Baronet (c.1564-1639) of Boconnoc, with arms of Mohun: Or, a cross engrailed sable

The Mohuns of Boconnoc and of Hall in the parish of Lanteglos-by-Fowey, in Cornwall, were a junior branch of the Mohun family, and were descended from John Mohun (d. 1322) of Dunster Castle in Somerset, feudal baron of Dunster by his wife Anne Tiptoft. William Mohun of Hall married Elizabeth Courtenay, one of the greatest heiresses of her time, one of the four eventual co-heiresses of Edward Courtenay, 1st Earl of Devon (1527–1556) the last of the mediaeval Courtenay Earls of Devon. The Mohun share of the Courtenay inheritance included Boconnoc in Cornwall and Okehampton Castle in Devon, and other remnants of the feudal barony of Okehampton, one of the earliest possessions of the Courtenays.

The grandson of William Mohun of Hall and Elizabeth Courtenay was Reginald Mohun (1507/8–1567) of Hall and Boconnoc, who married Jone Trevanion, daughter of Sir William Trevanion and sister of Sir Hugh Trevanion.

The son of Reginald Mohun and Jone Trevanion was Sir William Mohun (c.1540 – 1588) of Hall and Boconnoc, a Member of Parliament. By his first wife Elizabeth Horsey, the daughter of Sir John Horsey (d. 1564), MP, he had two sons and one daughter, of whom the eldest son and heir was John Mohun, 1st Baron Mohun of Okehampton (1595–1641) who was elevated to the peerage by King Charles I as Baron Mohun of Okehampton, in recognition of his ancestor having inherited Okehampton Castle as his share of the Courtenay inheritance.

The widow of Charles Mohun, 4th Baron Mohun (c.1675-1712) sold Boconnoc to Thomas Pitt (1653-1726).

=== Pitt ===
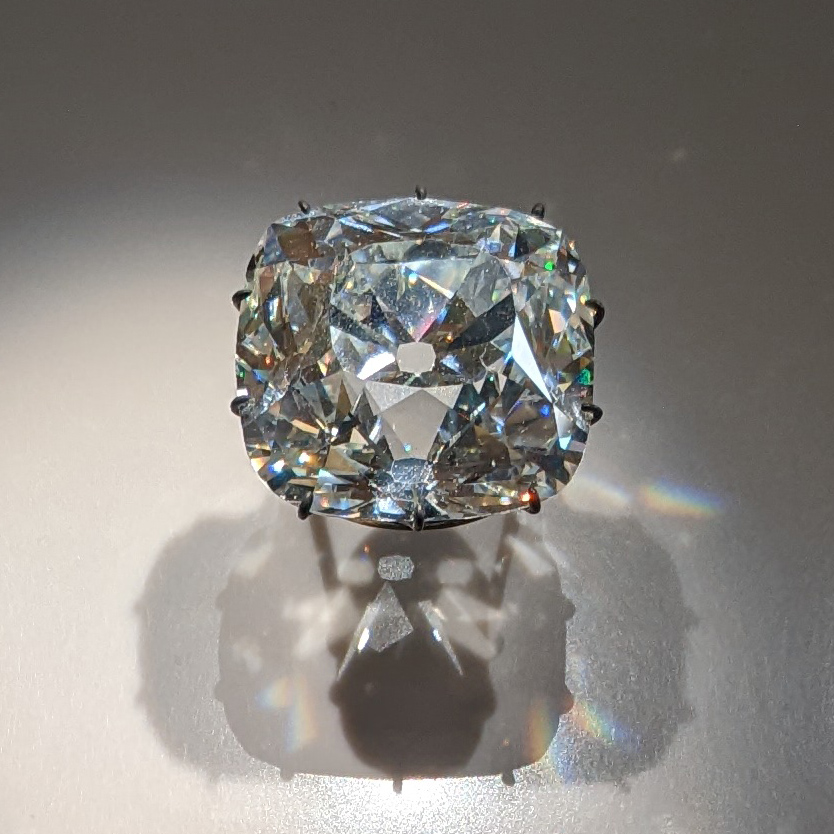
The "Pitt Diamond", 40% of the proceeds of which were used by Thomas Pitt to purchase the Boconnoc estate after 1717

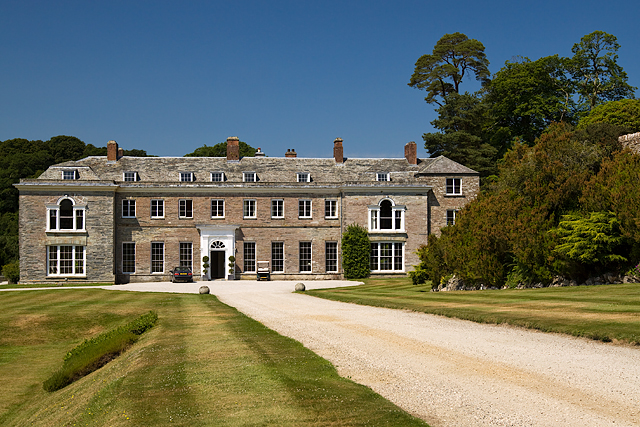
Boconnoc House, east front, re-built in 1721 by Thomas Pitt, President of Madras, and expanded in 1772 by his great-grandson Thomas Pitt, 1st Baron Camelford

Thomas Pitt (1653-1726) of Blandford St Mary in Dorset, was President of Madras in India and six times a Member of Parliament. He was the grandfather of William Pitt, 1st Earl of Chatham ("Pitt the Elder"), the father of William Pitt the Younger, both prime ministers of Great Britain. Thomas Pitt was a wealthy trader who had made a fortune in India, where he acquired for the sum of £20,400 a large and valuable diamond, known as the "Pitt Diamond" (now the "Regent Diamond"). Having sold it in 1717 to the French Regent, Philippe II, Duke of Orléans, for £135,000, he was able to purchase the Boconnoc estate for £54,000. The "Regent Diamond" is today on display in the Louvre Museum and is valued at about £60 million. He also used his great wealth to acquire political influence which he did by purchasing the rotten boroughs of Old Sarum in Wiltshire, where he had the power to nominate both MPs, and Okehampton in Devon, where he had the power to nominate one. He also acquired considerable influence in at least two Cornish boroughs, namely Camelford and Grampound. Many of his family entered Parliament representing these family boroughs. After his death in 1726 the estate passed to his son Robert Pitt (1680-1727), MP, who died one year later in 1727, when the estate descended to his son Thomas Pitt (c.1705-1761), Lord Warden of the Stannaries, the elder brother of William Pitt the Elder, the prime minister.

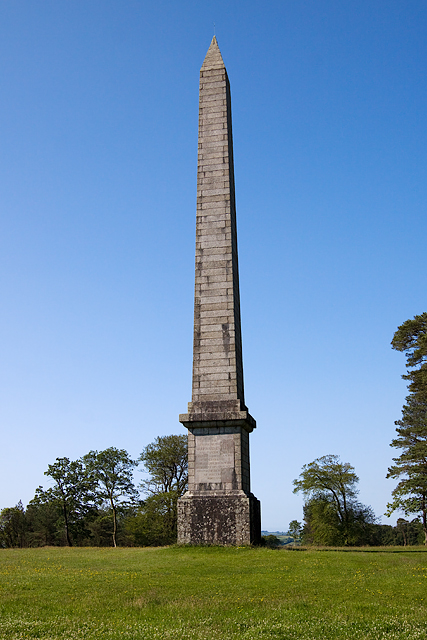
Obelisk erected at Boconnoc in 1771 by Thomas Pitt, 1st Baron Camelford in memory of his uncle and benefactor Sir Richard Lyttelton (d.1770). Situated 1 km to N-E of the house

In 1731 Thomas Pitt (c.1705-1761) of Boconnoc married Christiana Lyttelton, a daughter of Sir Thomas Lyttelton, 4th Baronet, MP, of Hagley in Worcestershire and a sister of George Lyttelton, 1st Baron Lyttelton. His only surviving son was Thomas Pitt, 1st Baron Camelford (1737-1793), of Boconnoc, who developed the china clay mine on the Boconnoc estate, and in 1772 added a south wing to Boconnoc House in the form of a picture gallery (demolished 1971). He died in Italy, but his body was brought home and buried within Boconnoc Church, next to the house. A monument survives near the house, in the form of a tall granite obelisk, in memory of the antiquary Sir Richard Lyttelton (d.1770), the uncle of the 1st Baron Camelford, who bequeathed him much of his fortune. Inscribed:

In gratitude and affection to the memory of Sir Richard Lyttelton and to perpetuate that peculiar character of benevolence which rendered him the delight of his own age and worthy of the veneration of posterity MDCCLXXI

Thomas Pitt, 2nd Baron Camelford (1775–1804), the son of the 1st Baron, was killed in a duel in 1804, when his heir to Boconnoc became his only sister Anne Pitt (1772-1864) (Lady Grenville), the wife of William Grenville, 1st Baron Grenville, Prime Minister from 1806 to 1807. Her heir was her nephew George Matthew Fortescue (1791-1877).

=== Fortescue ===
- George Matthew Fortescue (1791-1877) was the second son of Hugh Fortescue, 1st Earl Fortescue of Castle Hill, Filleigh in Devon, by his wife Hester Grenville (1767-1847), a daughter of the Prime Minister George Grenville (1712-1770). In 1833 he married Lady Louisa Elizabeth Ryder (d.1899), the 5th daughter of Dudley Ryder, 1st Earl of Harrowby (1762–1847) (her sister Lady Susan Ryder having married George Matthew Fortescue's elder brother the 2nd Earl Fortescue), and shortly thereafter inherited Boconnoc from his aunt Anne Pitt (1772-1864) (Lady Grenville).
- Cyril Dudley Fortescue (1847-1890) of Boconnoc, Lt-Col Coldstream Guards, the third son of George Matthew Fortescue. In the Return of Owners of Land survey of 1873 he was listed in the top ten landowners in Cornwall with an estate of 20,148 acres (81.54 km^{2}), or 2.65% of Cornwall. He died without issue when his heir became his younger brother John Bevill Fortescue (born 1850).
- John Bevill Fortescue (born 1850), a barrister, JP and DL for Cornwall, High Sheriff of Cornwall in 1894, who in 1891 married Dorothy Augusta Hoste, a daughter of Admiral Sir William Legge George Hoste, 2nd Baronet (1818–1868).
- John Grenville Fortescue (1896-1969) of Boconnoc (2nd son of John Bevill Fortescue) Coldstream Guards, married Daphne Marjory Bourke, only child of Hon Algernon Henry Bourke, a son of Richard Southwell Bourke, 6th Earl of Mayo. His son and heir was (John) Desmond Grenville Fortescue (1919-2017).
- Captain (John) Desmond Grenville Fortescue (1919-2017), Coldstream Guards, JP and DL for Cornwall, and High Sheriff of Cornwall for 1966/7. He married firstly, in 1942, Nina Kendall-Lane, daughter of Ernest Kendall-Lane, and secondly, in 1988, Angela Dorothy England. In 2003 his address was given as "The Stewardry, Boconnoc", having handed over the management of the house to his son Anthony Desmond Grenville Fortescue (1946-2015).
- Anthony Desmond Grenville Fortescue (1946-2015) of Boconnoc, High Sheriff of Cornwall, who married Elizabeth Ann Evered Poole, a daughter of Major Campbell Evered Poole. He was found dead in Boconnoc House on 9 November 2015 following a firearms incident. The inquest returned an open verdict. He predeceased his father by two years, and left two daughters and co-heiresses.

== Boconnoc House and estate ==
Boconnoc House (Grade II* listed) was built in the 18th century by two members of the Pitt family: one wing was built c. 1721 by Thomas Pitt, Governor of Madras, and the other in 1772 by Thomas Pitt, 1st Baron Camelford. The two wings formed an L-shape and the grounds are finely landscaped: on a hill behind the house is an obelisk in memory of Sir Richard Lyttelton (1771). During the 19th century the estate passed into the ownership of the Fortescues who made some alterations to the structure in 1883: there are some more recent additions and the south wing was demolished in 1971.

The parish church is behind the house and fairly small: its dedication is unknown. It contains an interesting 15th-century font and a monument to Penelope Mohun, 1637. The modern tower has five sides in the lower part and eight in the upper. Features of interest include a musicians' gallery, the altar table made by Sir Reginald (Raynold) Mohun, 1621, the Jacobean pulpit, and a monument to Penelope Mohun (d.1637) the wife of William Drew.

The estate, surrounding the River Lerryn, contains a deer park, lake, agricultural land and woodland. Parts of the estate are designated as Boconnoc Park Important Plant Area and Boconnoc Park & Woods Site of Special Scientific Interest, noted for its biological characteristics.

The estate includes the largest landscaped deer park in Cornwall, the home of the Boconnoc Cricket Club. In 1993 the estate was used as a location for the film The Three Musketeers.

== Trecangate ==
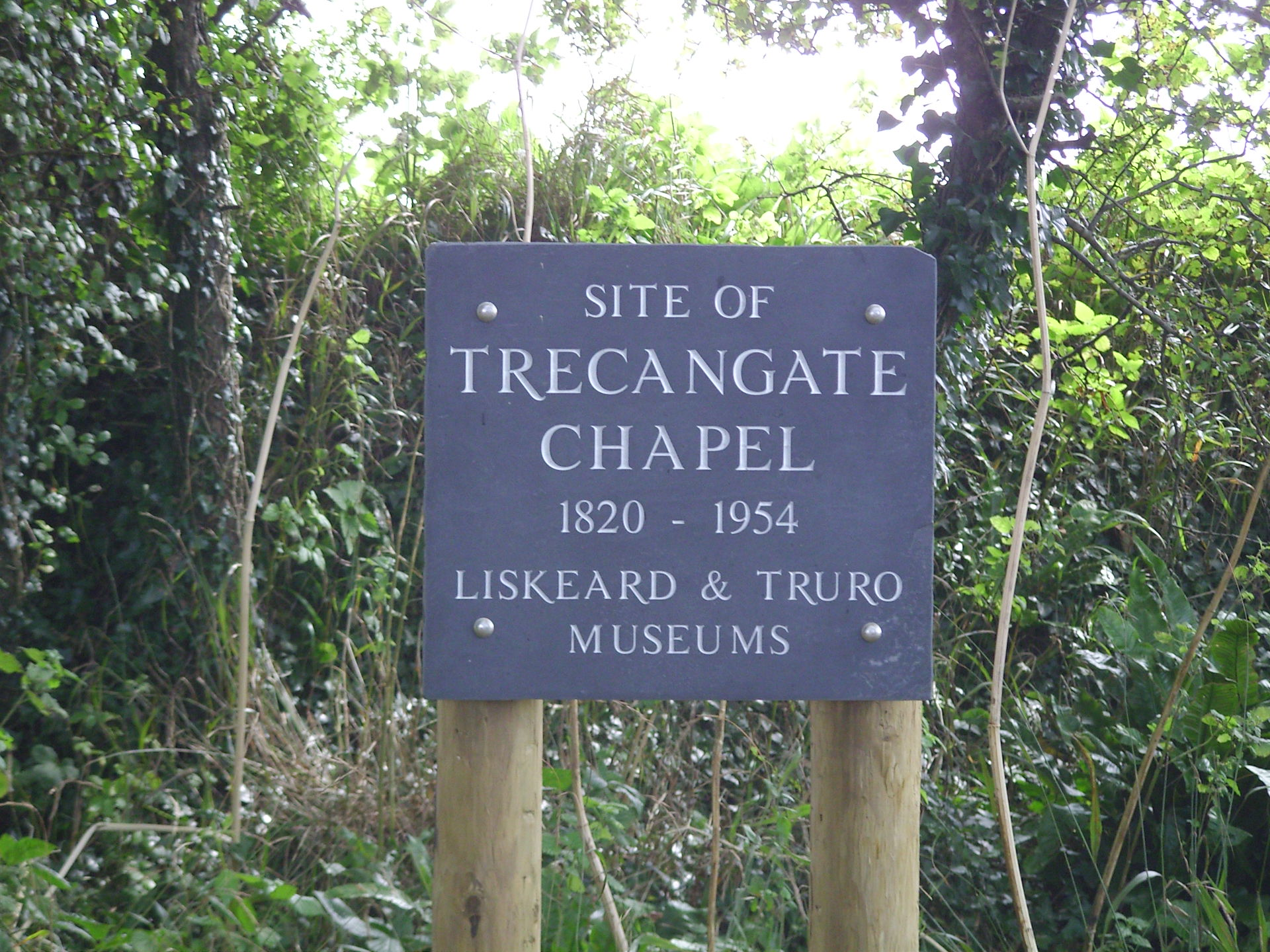
Sign marking site of Trecangate Chapel

Between 1820 and 1954 a Methodist chapel stood in the hamlet of Trecangate, in the parish of Boconnoc. It was built using cob walls; a sign marking its position was erected in 2009.

== Cornish wrestling ==
Cornish wrestling tournaments, for prizes, were held in Boconnoc in the 1700s.

== Wildlife and ecology ==
Old-growth, sessile oak (Quercus petraea), growing in ravines and slopes in parts of the ancient deer park at Boconnoc House, contain an internationally important assemblage of lichens, making it one of the most important sites in Europe. The site is also considered to be the best ″old-growth, southern-oceanic oak woodland″ in the south-west.

== See also ==
- Battle of Braddock Down
