= Pinckney Wilkinson =

Pinckney Wilkinson (c. 1693–1784) was a British merchant and politician who sat in the House of Commons from 1774 to 1784.

Wilkinson was a wealthy London merchant. He married Mary Thurloe (or Thurlow) at Lincoln's Inn chapel on 16 December 1735. She was an heiress and he received about £10,000 out of her fortune. In 1752, he purchased the estate Polestead or Westgate, Norfolk and built Burnham Westgate Hall in the 1750s using Matthew Brettingham, the Holkham estate architect. He and Mary had two daughters and a son and he retired from business when this son died in 1760. In the 1760s he held about £50,000 of Government stock, and about £6,000 of Bank stock and when his wife died in 1771 he held her property in trust. His daughter Anne married Thomas Pitt on 29 July 1771. It was said he gave her £30,000 down, and at least as much more in expectation, and Pitt referred to "the great inheritance’ his wife brought". Wilkinson's second daughter Mary married John Smith without her parents’ consent.

At the 1774 general election Wilkinson was returned by his son-in-law Pitt, who stood himself, as Member of Parliament for Old Sarum. They were returned again in 1780. Wilkinson voted with the Opposition, and apparently never spoke in Parliament. He suffered a stroke in May 1782 and was incapacitated for his last two years in parliament.

Wilkinson died on 26 February 1784 aged 90. His will became a case in Chancery mainly because the Smiths had been left out of it. There were also considerable complications regarding which property was his and which that of his wife. John and Mary Smith's son, Sidney, became a distinguished admiral, serving in the American and French revolutionary wars and Napoleonic Wars.

Parliament of Great Britain
Preceded by William Gerard Hamilton; John Craufurd	Member of Parliament for Old Sarum; 1774–1784; With: Thomas Pitt (the younger) 1774-1784; The Hon. John Villiers 1784	Succeeded by George Hardinge; The Hon. John Villiers
