= Thomas Pitt, 2nd Baron Camelford =

Royal Navy officer and explorer (1775–1804)

The Right Honourable The Lord Camelford
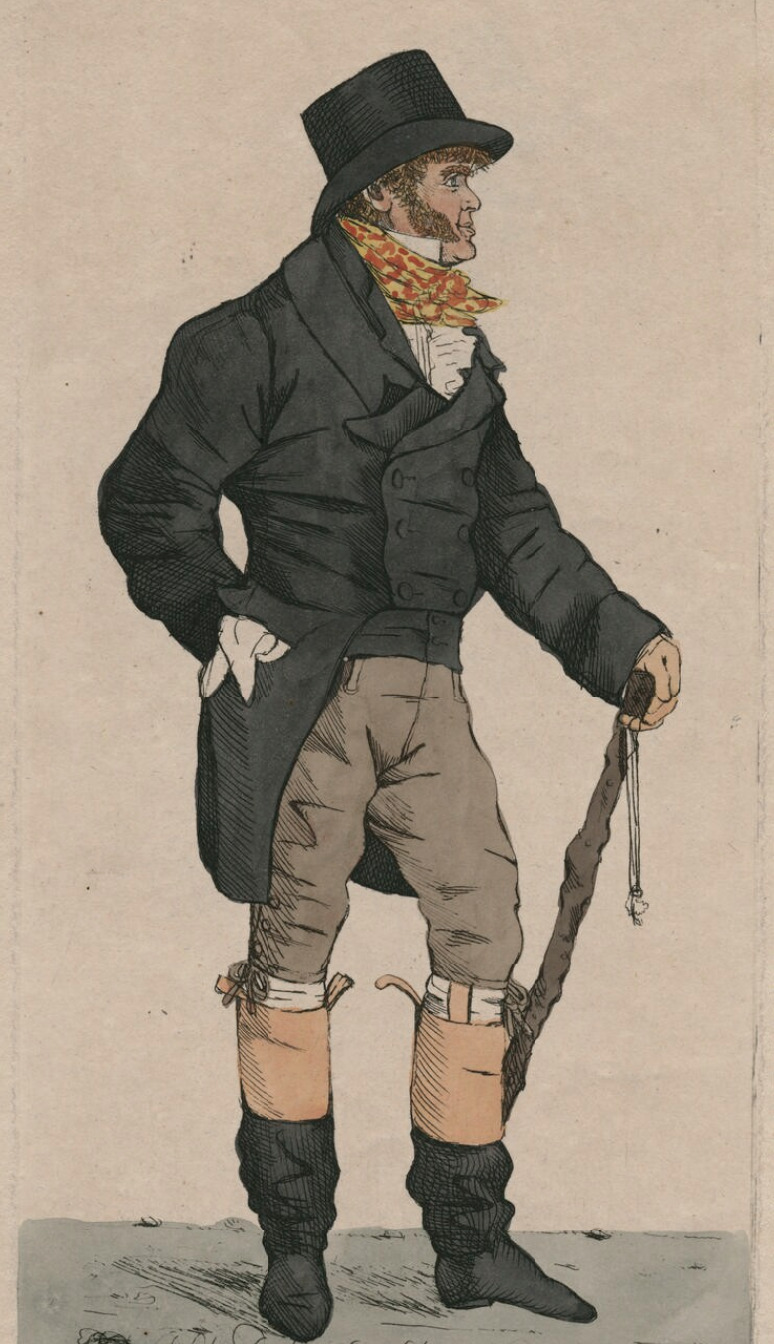
- Portrait by Robert Dighton Jr., 1804
- Born: 19 February 1775; Boconnoc, Cornwall
- Died: 11 March 1804 (aged 29); London, England
- Relatives: Prime Minister William Pitt the Younger
- Military career
- Allegiance: Great Britain
- Branch: Royal Navy
- Service years: 1781–1799
- Rank: Lieutenant
- Unit: HMS Charon
- Commands: HMS Favourite

Lieutenant Thomas Pitt, 2nd Baron Camelford (19 February 1775 – 10 March 1804) was a Royal Navy officer and explorer who participated in the Vancouver Expedition and feuded with its leader, George Vancouver, during and after the expedition.

== Early life ==
Pitt was born at Boconnoc, Cornwall, the only son of Thomas Pitt, 1st Baron Camelford and Anne, daughter of London merchant and politician Pinckney Wilkinson. He had a sister, Anne. His early years were spent in Switzerland. He was later educated at Charterhouse School. He spent a number of years there which he regarded as the happiest of his life. Having developed a love of the sea, when his father tried to have him transferred to another English public school, he refused to attend. Instead he decided to join the navy.

In the autumn of 1781, while he was under seven years of age, his name was borne on the books of HMS Tobago, but he most likely entered the navy, in actuality, some years later.

Pitt was on HMS Guardian, under Captain Edward Riou in 1789–90 when Guardian struck an iceberg near the Cape of Good Hope; most of the crew elected to leave the ship, but with Pitt and the remaining crew's assistance, Riou managed to bring her into Table Bay.

== The Vancouver Expedition ==
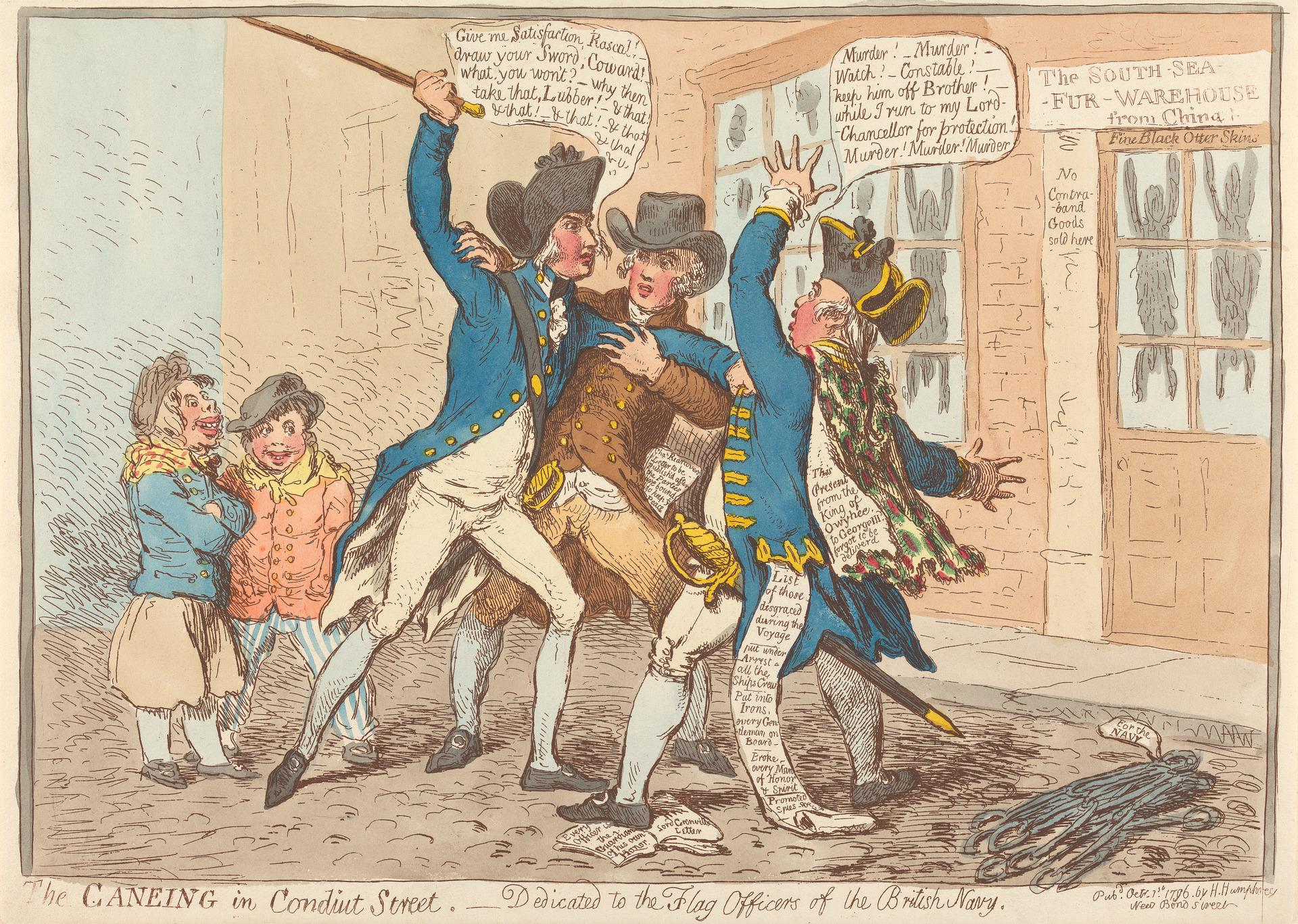
1796 cartoon mocking Pitt's assault on George Vancouver in Conduit Street

On 13 March 1791, Pitt came aboard HMS Discovery to participate in the Vancouver Expedition of diplomacy and exploration. All officer berths having been filled, he signed on as an able seaman. A friend of the family, Lt. Zachary Mudge, was informally requested to watch over the unruly 16-year-old.

When the expedition reached Tahiti, Pitt was flogged for trying to trade a piece of broken barrel-hoop for the romantic favours of an island woman. Vancouver had given strict orders against romancing the natives, since such escapades had played a major role in the mutiny on the Bounty; in addition, any captain was required to punish pilferage. Pitt was flogged again for unauthorised trade with Indians at Port Stewart and then again for breaking the binnacle glass while skylarking with another gentleman. Finally he was placed in irons for being found sleeping on watch, and served this sentence with common seamen.

No-one on the expedition could have known that Pitt had become a member of the House of Lords after his father had died on 19 June 1793, but his subsequent conduct leaves no doubt that he resented being disciplined by the 'low-born' Vancouver. When HMS Daedalus left the expedition to return home in 1793, Vancouver sent Pitt with her, along with a letter to Evan Nepean complaining of his conduct.

Pitt left Daedalus in Hawaii, found his way to Malacca and joined HMS Resistance as an able seaman on 8 December 1794. He was soon appointed acting lieutenant, and then participated in the capture of Malacca on 17 August 1795, when he led the boarding party that took over the Dutch East Indies Company's ship Constantia (1782 ship), stranded in the mud. On 24 November 1795 was summarily discharged and left to find his own way home. He took passage in the Union, which was cast away on the coast of Ceylon. He eventually made his way to Europe.

Meanwhile, Vancouver had completed his expedition and returned to England in 1795. Pitt's allies, including his cousin, Prime Minister William Pitt the Younger, treated Vancouver badly enough. However Thomas Pitt took a more direct role; on 29 August 1796 he sent Vancouver a letter heaping many insults on the head of his former captain, and challenging him to a duel. Vancouver gravely replied that he was unable "in a private capacity to answer for his public conduct in his official duty" and offered instead to submit to formal examination by flag officers. Pitt chose instead to stalk Vancouver, ultimately assaulting him on a London street corner. The terms of their legal dispute required both parties to keep the peace, but nothing stopped his civilian brother Charles from interposing and giving Pitt blow after blow until onlookers restrained the attacker. Charges and counter-charges flew in the press, with the wealthy Camelford faction having the greater firepower until Vancouver, ailing from his long naval service, died.

== Later life ==
Pitt was promoted to the rank of lieutenant on 7 April 1797 and appointed acting commander of HMS Favourite over the head of her first lieutenant, Charles Peterson, who was his senior. A contemporary account describes Pitt as being of eccentric appearance during this period of his life; dressing in a shabby lieutenant's uniform with buttons turned green with verdigris, topped by an oversized gold-laced hat. In 1798 Peterson transferred away from Favourite and was assigned command of HMS Perdrix in 1798. Both ships were at dock in Antigua when the young officers quarreled over rank. Peterson drew up his men to resist, but Pitt walked up to him, and on Peterson's thrice refusing to obey his orders, shot him dead. Pitt was court-martialled but, probably because England was currently in a panic over the recent Spithead and Nore mutinies, acquitted.

In October 1798, Pitt was transferred to serve on the frigate HMS Charon. The following January, he was arrested as a result of attempting an unauthorised visit to France. Angered, Pitt left the Royal Navy and returned to London. There, Pitt seems not to have moderated his conduct. On 17 May 1799 he was fined for knocking a man down stairs in a quarrel. In January 1802, when he refused to illuminate his house to celebrate the peace with France, an angry mob smashed his darkened windows; he fought the mob until subdued. In 1799 he contributed £1,500 to the establishment of a school by William Nicholson (the chemist) at 10 Soho Square. Reputedly, he performed other philanthropic acts, insisting on anonymity. He would visit the Seven Dials area of London under an assumed name and somewhat in disguise, looking to assist poor people "ashamed to beg". The same account reports that Pitt was actually of a mild disposition, and was not on the look-out for reasons to take offence.

== Death ==
Pitt's life came to an end when he quarrelled with his friend, Captain Best R.N., over a report that the latter had made an uncomplimentary remark about Pitt to a lady whose favours Pitt was then enjoying but who had previously been Best's mistress. Learning of this, Pitt challenged Best and insulted him. The following morning, they met again at a coffee house and Best asked Pitt to withdraw his remarks based upon their former friendship; he refused, possibly knowing that Best's famous skill with the pistol would leave him open to accusations of cowardice.

On 7 March 1804, they duelled in a meadow – adjacent to the grounds of Holland House – with pistols; Pitt missed; Best did not. The bullet had passed through Pitt's fifth rib, the right lobe of his lungs, and finally into the sixth vertebra of his spine. Following the duel, both Best and his second departed. Pitt's second and the local gardeners carried Pitt to the nearby Little Holland House, where surgeon Simon Nickolson examined him. Pitt had been left paralysed and his chest cavity was filled with blood. He died from his wounds three days later. The then owner of the house, Lord Holland, erected an antique Roman altar on the spot where Camelford fell, inscribed with the legend "HOC DIS MAN. VOTO DISCORDIAM DEPRECAMUR." (Note: The Latin would appear to read, 'To the spirits of the departed. We beg to differ' (Google Translate))

Pitt's will made clear that Best was not to be charged in the event of his death. It also pledged £1000 to the city of Berne, Switzerland. Camelford having no known heir, the title became extinct. The attitude of the public toward this violent and unrestrained man may be shown by a quip of the day. His will had directed that his body be buried on the island St. Pierre, Lake Biel, in Switzerland, a place dear to his childhood, but the war delayed this. The body was therefore embalmed and placed in a crypt at St Anne's Church, Soho, whence it disappeared without explanation. This became the object of humour, with wits merrily quipping "What has become of Lord Camelford's body?"

== Insanity ==
Throughout Pitt's life, many thought him to be mad due to his violent nature. He had a strong sense of honour, and was frequently embroiled in violence, which was ultimately the cause of his death. Furthermore, there was rarely a time in his later life when Pitt was not engaged in some legal battle. Following his death, his wish to leave £1000 to the city of Berne was viewed by one acquaintance as "proof of his madness". When a full-length biography of Pitt was published in 1978, author Nikolai Tolstoy gave it the title The Half-Mad Lord in reference to this characteristic.

== Ships ==
When Camelford died, three whalers that he owned or part-owned – Cambridge, Wilding (or Willding), and Caerwent – passed to Lord Grenville, a relative by marriage, who sold them when they returned from their voyages.

== Citations ==
Peerage of Great Britain
Preceded by Thomas Pitt	Baron Camelford; 1793–1804	Extinct
