= Sir Reginald Mohun, 1st Baronet =

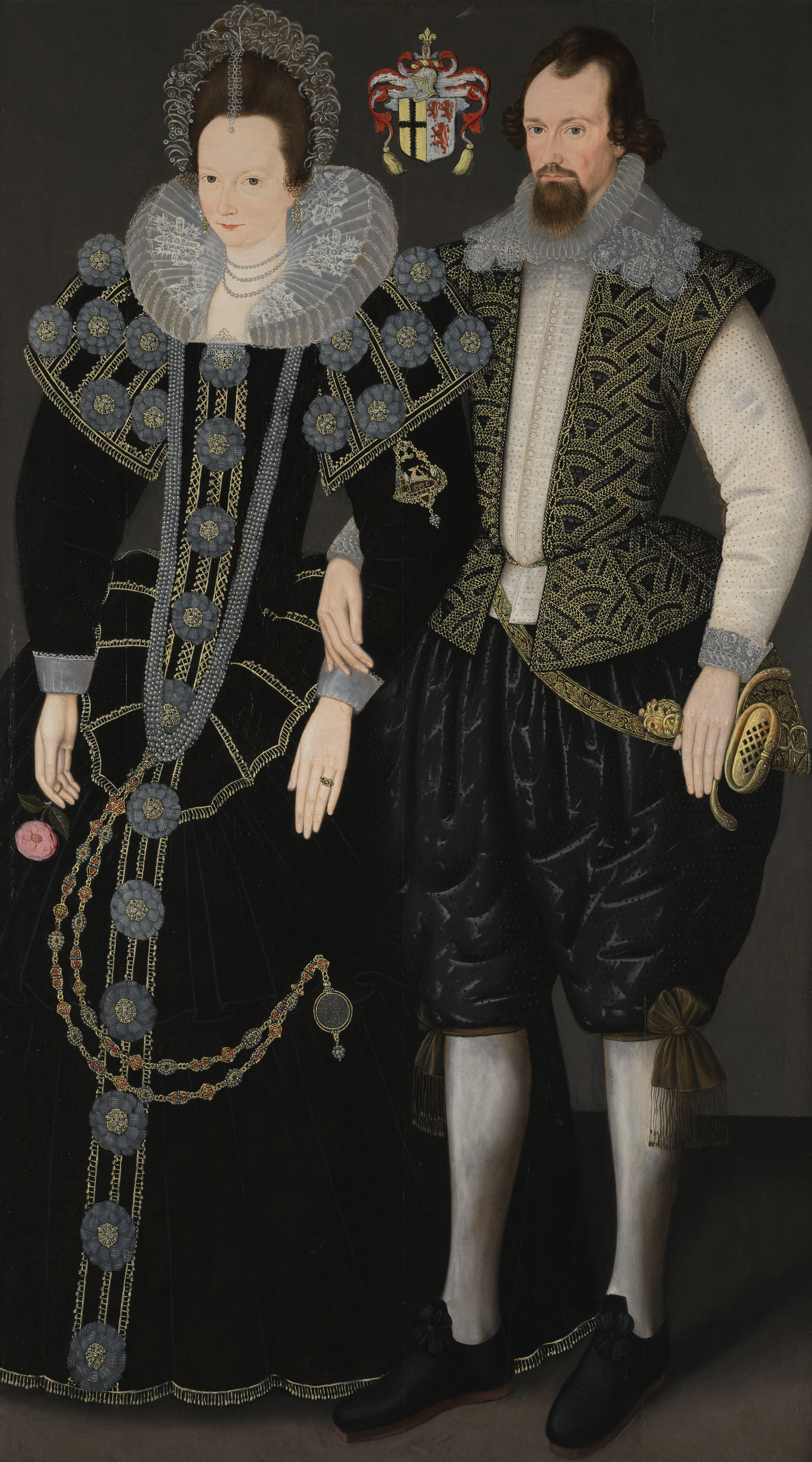
Sir Reginald Mohun and Dorothy Mohun (née Chudleigh), Yale Center for British Art

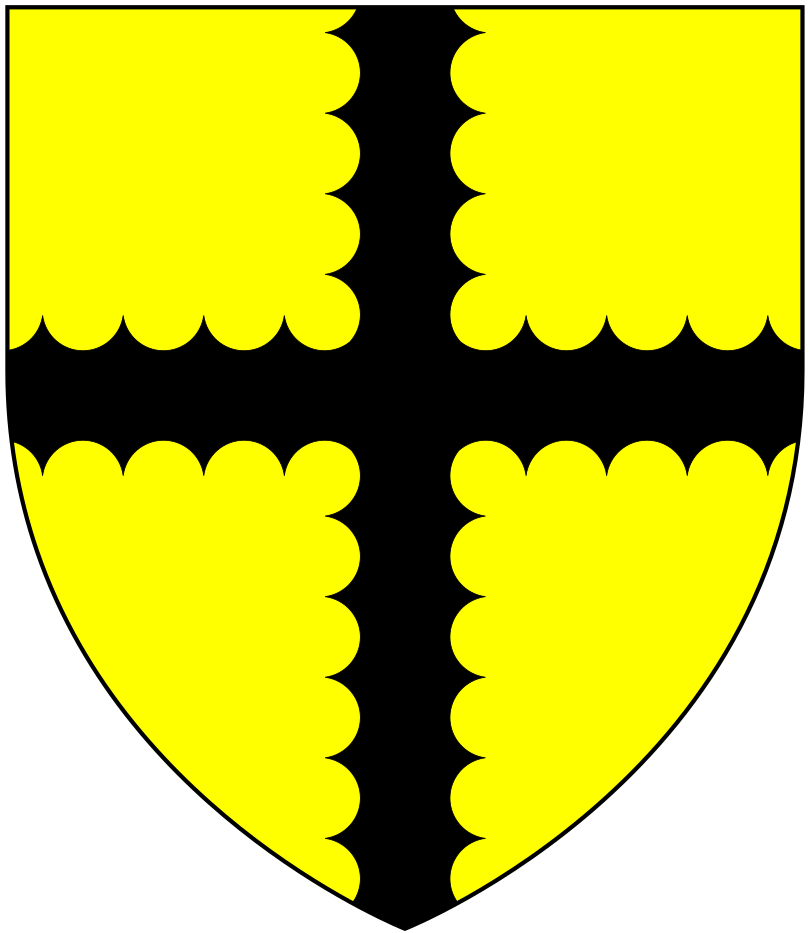
Arms of Mohun: Or, a cross engrailed sable

Sir Reginald Mohun, 1st Baronet (1564 – 26 December 1639) of Boconnoc in Cornwall, was a prominent member of the gentry of Cornwall and an MP.

== Origins ==
He was the eldest son and heir of Sir William Mohun (d. 1587) of Boconnoc, Sheriff of Cornwall in 1572, by his first wife Elizabeth Horsey, daughter and heiress of John Horsey. He was descended from the ancient Mohun family, feudal barons of Dunster in Somerset, seated at Dunster Castle.

== Career ==
He was the Member of Parliament for Fowey in 1584 and 1586 and for East Looe in 1614. He was also elected in a double return in 1625 when four names were submitted, which was not knowingly resolved by Parliament. He was selected Sheriff of Cornwall for 1592–93 and made a Deputy Lieutenant of Cornwall in 1600.

He was knighted in 1599 and created a baronet on 25 November 1612.

== Marriages and children ==
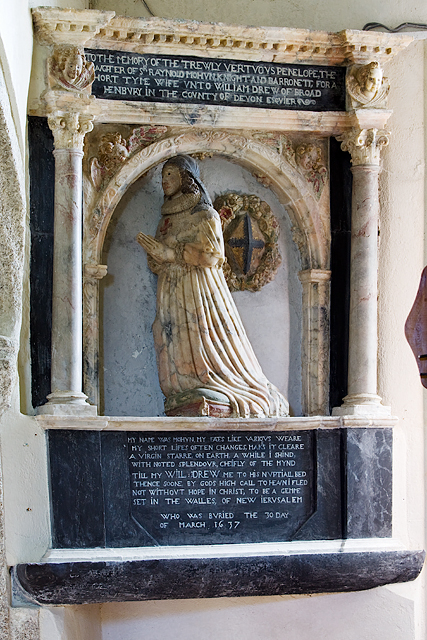
Mural monument with kneeling effigy, in Boconnoc Church, of Penelope Mohun (d.1637), a daughter of Sir Reginald Mohun, 1st Baronet (c.1564-1639) of Boconnoc, with arms of Mohun

He married three times:

- Firstly in 1589 to Mary Killigrew, 3rd daughter of Sir Henry Killigrew (c. 1528 – 1603), MP, diplomat and ambassador, by whom he had one son:
  - William Mohun (d. 1613) who predeceased his father without children.
- Secondly to Philippa Hele, a daughter of the eminent lawyer Sir John Hele (died 1608) of Wembury in Devon, by whom he had children including:
  - John Mohun, 2nd Baronet, 1st Baron Mohun of Okehampton (1595–1640), eldest son and heir, created Baron Mohun of Okehampton in 1628. This was in reference to his family being one of the heirs of the Courtenay Earls of Devon and feudal barons of Okehampton in Devon, seated at Okehampton Castle. His ancestor William Mohun of Hall in the parish of Lanteglos-by-Fowey, Cornwall, had married Elizabeth Courtenay, a daughter of Sir Hugh Courtenay (1427–1471) of Boconnoc and one of the four co-heiresses of the last of the old Earls of Devon.
  - Elizabeth Mohun (born 1593), wife of John Trelawney of Trelawney in Cornwall.
- Thirdly he married Dorothy Chudleigh, a daughter of John Chudleigh (1565–1589), MP, of Ashton, Devon, and sister of Sir George Chudleigh, 1st Baronet (c. 1578 – 1658), MP for Lostwithiel, Cornwall, in 1621 and 1625 and for East Looe, Cornwall, in 1614. By his wife he had three sons and four daughters, including:
  - Reginald Mohun (1605–1642), 2nd son, a Member of Parliament for Lostwithiel, Cornwall, in 1626.
  - Ferdinando Mohun, 3rd son.
  - George Mohun (born 1613), 4th son.

== Death ==
He died on 26 December 1639 and his will was proved on 30 April 1640.

== Sources ==
- Vivian, Lt.Col. J.L., (Ed.) The Visitations of Cornwall: Comprising the Heralds' Visitations of 1530, 1573 & 1620; with additions by J.L. Vivian, Exeter, 1887, pp 323–326, pedigree of "Mohun of Boconnoc"

Baronetage of England
New creation	Baronet (of Boconnoc); 1611–1639	Succeeded by John Mohun
