= Roger Martin =

Roger Martin may refer to:

- Roger Martin (recusant) (c. 1526/7–1615)
- Sir Roger Martin, 1st Baronet (1639–1712)
- Sir Roger Martin, 2nd Baronet (1667–1742)
- Sir Roger Martin, 3rd Baronet (1689–1762)
- Sir Roger Martin, 5th Baronet (1778–1854)
- Roger E. Martin (1935–2023), American businessman and Oregon state legislator and lobbyist
- Roger Martin (diplomat) (born 1941), Chair to Board of Trustees, Population Matters (formerly Optimum Population Trust)
- Roger H. Martin (born 1943), president of Randolph–Macon College
- Roger Martin (professor) (born 1956), former Dean of the Rotman School of Management at the University of Toronto
- Roger Martin (actor) (1952–2026), British actor
- Roger Dale Martin, heavy metal musician
- Sir Roger Martyn (lord mayor), or Martyn, mercer and Lord Mayor of London in 1567
