= Martin baronets of Long Melford (1667) =

Escutcheon of the Martin baronets of Long Melford

The Martin baronetcy, of Long Melford in the County of Suffolk, was created in the Baronetage of England on 28 March 1667 for Roger Martin. He had married in 1663 Tamworth Horner, only daughter of the court beauty Elizabeth, Lady Monson with her second husband Edward Horner. The title became extinct on the death of the 5th Baronet in 1854.

== Martin baronets, of Long Melford (1667) ==
- Sir Roger Martin, 1st Baronet (1639–1712)
- Sir Roger Martin, 2nd Baronet (1667–1742)
- Sir Roger Martin, 3rd Baronet (1689–1762)
- Sir Mordaunt Martin, 4th Baronet (1740–1815)
- Sir Roger Martin, 5th Baronet (1778–1854)
