= Roger Martyn =

Roger Martyn may refer to:

- Roger Martin (recusant) (c. 1526/7–1615)
- Sir Roger Martyn (lord mayor), mercer and Lord Mayor of London in 1567

== See also ==
- Roger Martin (disambiguation)
