= Alexander Denton =

Alexander Denton may refer to:

- Alexander Denton (died 1576), landowner in Buckinghamshire, England
- Alexander Denton (Royalist) (died 1645), English politician who sat in the House of Commons variously between 1625 and 1644
- Alexander Denton (judge) (1679–1740), English Member of Parliament and Justice of the Common Pleas
- Alexander Denton (1654–1698), Member of Parliament for Buckingham, 1690–1698
