= Sir Roger Martin, 3rd Baronet =

- Baronet
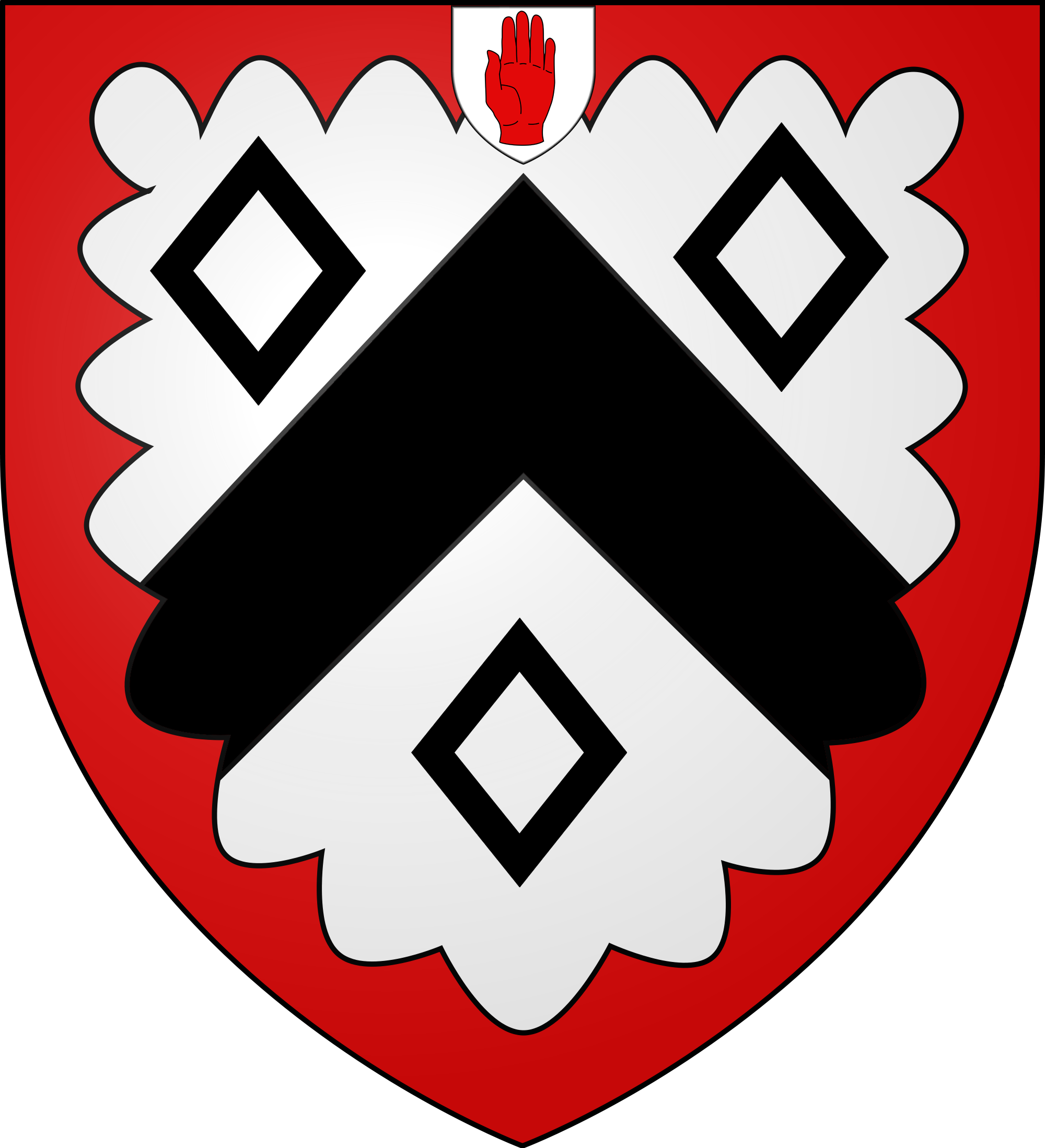
- Coat of arms of the Martins of Long Melford. Argent, a chevron between three mascles Sable within a bordure engrailed Gules. The red hand on an escutcheon signifies the arms of a baronet
- Born: 1689; Long Melford, Suffolk
- Died: 12 June 1762 (aged 72–73)
- Noble family: Martin of Long Melford
- Spouse: Sophia Mordaunt
- Issue: Sir Mordaunt Martin, 4th Baronet; Anna-Marie Martin
- Father: Sir Roger Martin, 2nd Baronet
- Mother: Anna-Marie Harvey

Sir Roger Martin, 3rd Baronet (c. 1689 - 12 June 1762) was son of Sir Roger Martin, 2nd Baronet and Anna-Marie Harvey. He inherited his baronetcy from his father, who was the second Martin Baronet of Long Melford, upon his death in 1762.

== Personal life ==
On 5 June 1739 Sir Roger married Sophia Mordaunt (1719 - 22 Dec 1752), daughter of the honourable Brigadier General Lewis Mordaunt of Massingham and niece of Charles Mordaunt, 3rd Earl of Peterborough, and by her had one son and one daughter:

- Sir Mordaunt Martin, 4th Baronet (1740 - 24 September 1815), who married first Everilda-Dorothea, daughter of Rev. William Smith of Burnham in Norfolk, and secondly Catherine, daughter of Armine Styleman of Snettisham in Norfolk.
- Anne-Marie Martin (b. 1742), who married Louis Vigoreaux.

Sir Roger died on 12 June 1762, when his title passed to his eldest son.

Baronetage of England
Preceded by Roger Martin	Baronet (of Long Melford); 1689 – 1762	Succeeded by Mordaunt Martin
