= Anne Elliot (novelist) =

English novelist (1856–1941)

Anne Elliot (1856–1941) was an English writer. Elliot's novels "show women in roles usually occupied by men."

== Biography ==
Anne was born in Newcastle upon Tyne in 1856 to Henry Elliot, a surgeon, and his wife Ann (sic). Anne and her elder sister Emma Elliott (1850–1927) were educated at home. They ran a private school at Jesmond (now a suburb of Newcastle) in the late 1870s and both later held posts as governesses. They turned to novel writing some time in the 1880s. Emma wrote five novels over a twelve-year period, writing as Margery Hollis.

Thereafter the Elliot sisters seem to have shared accommodation at boarding houses on the English coast and in the London suburbs. By 1901, they were living together in the seaside village of Burnham Sutton, Norfolk.

Neither Anne Elliot nor her sister ever married. Little is known of their personal lives. She died in 1941 and her sister at Burnham Sutton in 1927.

== Career ==
Anne Elliot's first novel of thirteen, Dr. Edith Romney (1883), centres on a female general practitioner in a country town. Margery Hollis's first, Anthony Fairfax, appeared two years later. Evelyn's Career (1891) presents "another strong-minded heroine" amid realistic scenes of London poverty. The heroine of A Woman Takes the Helm (1892) takes over the running of her father's dye works.

A critic in the 1990s concluded that "AE's novels are long and her plots over-complicated, but her writing is not without talent." They were taken by two well-known London publishers. The full list:

- Dr. Edith Romney: A Novel. 3 vols, Bentley, 1883. Reprinted as a British Library Historical Print Edition, 2011
- My Wife's Niece. 3 vols, Bentley, 1885
- An Old Man's Favour. 3 vols, Bentley, 1887
- Her Own Counsel: A Novel. 3 vols, Bentley, 1889. Reprinted as a British Library Historical Print Edition, 2011
- Evelyn's Career: A Novel. 3 vols, Bentley, 1891
- A Woman at the Helm. 3 vols, Hurst and Blackett, 1892
- The Winning of May. 3 vols, Hurst and Blackett, 1893
- A Family Arrangement. 3 vols, Bentley, 1894
- Michael Daunt: A Novel. 3 vols, Hurst and Blackett, 1895
- Lord Harborough: A Novel. 3 vols, Hurst and Blackett, 1896
- Where the Reeds Wave: A Story. 2 vols, Bentley, 1897
- A Martial Maid. 1 vol., Hurst and Blackett, 1900
- Mansell's Millions, 1 vol., Hurst and Blackett, 1903

Non-fiction:

- The Memoirs of Mimosa. Stanley Paul & Co., 1912
