= Sir Richard Martin, 1st Baronet, of Cappagh =

Martin baronets
- Escutcheon of the Martin baronets of Cappagh
- Creation date: 1885
- Status: extinct
- Extinction date: 1901
- Motto: Sic Itur Ad Astra (thus one journeys to the stars)
- Arms: Sable a cross calvary Or in chief the sun in splendour of the last between on the dexter an increscent and on the sinister a decrescent Argent.
- Crest: In front of an anchor Sable an estoile Or.
- Granted 7 May 1884 by Sir John Bernard Burke, Ulster King of Arms.

Sir Richard Martin, 1st Baronet JP, PC (17 March 1831 – 18 October 1901) was an Irish industrialist and a high sheriff of Dublin.

== Family ==
Martin was the son of the Anglo-Irish landowner James Martin of Cappagh in the county of Dublin. He was educated at Clongowes Wood College. On 4 October 1864 he married Mary, daughter of the Queen's physician-in-ordinary, Sir Dominic Corrigan, Bt. The Irish artist Fergus Martin is his great-grandnephew.

== Business and public career ==
Martin was a member of one of the oldest timber and shipowner firms in Dublin, and a successful shipping magnate in the port of Dublin. He was appointed to several public boards of the city, including the Irish Lights Board, the Loan Fund Board, and the Port and Docks Board, where he was chairman.

In 1870, he served as Prussian and North German Confederation consul in Dublin.

In 1885 he was President of the Dublin Chamber of Commerce, and on 2 June 1885 was created a Baronet, of Cappagh in the county of Dublin. In 1896 he was further honoured when he was created a member of the Privy Council of Ireland.

Sir Richard Martin died in Dublin in October 1901, aged 70, when the title became extinct.

Baronetage of the United Kingdom
New creation	Baronet (of Cappagh); 1885 – 1901	Extinct
Preceded by Guinness baronets	Martin baronets of Cappagh; 2 June 1885	Succeeded by Millais baronets
