= Thomas Denton (died 1558) =

English lawyer and politician

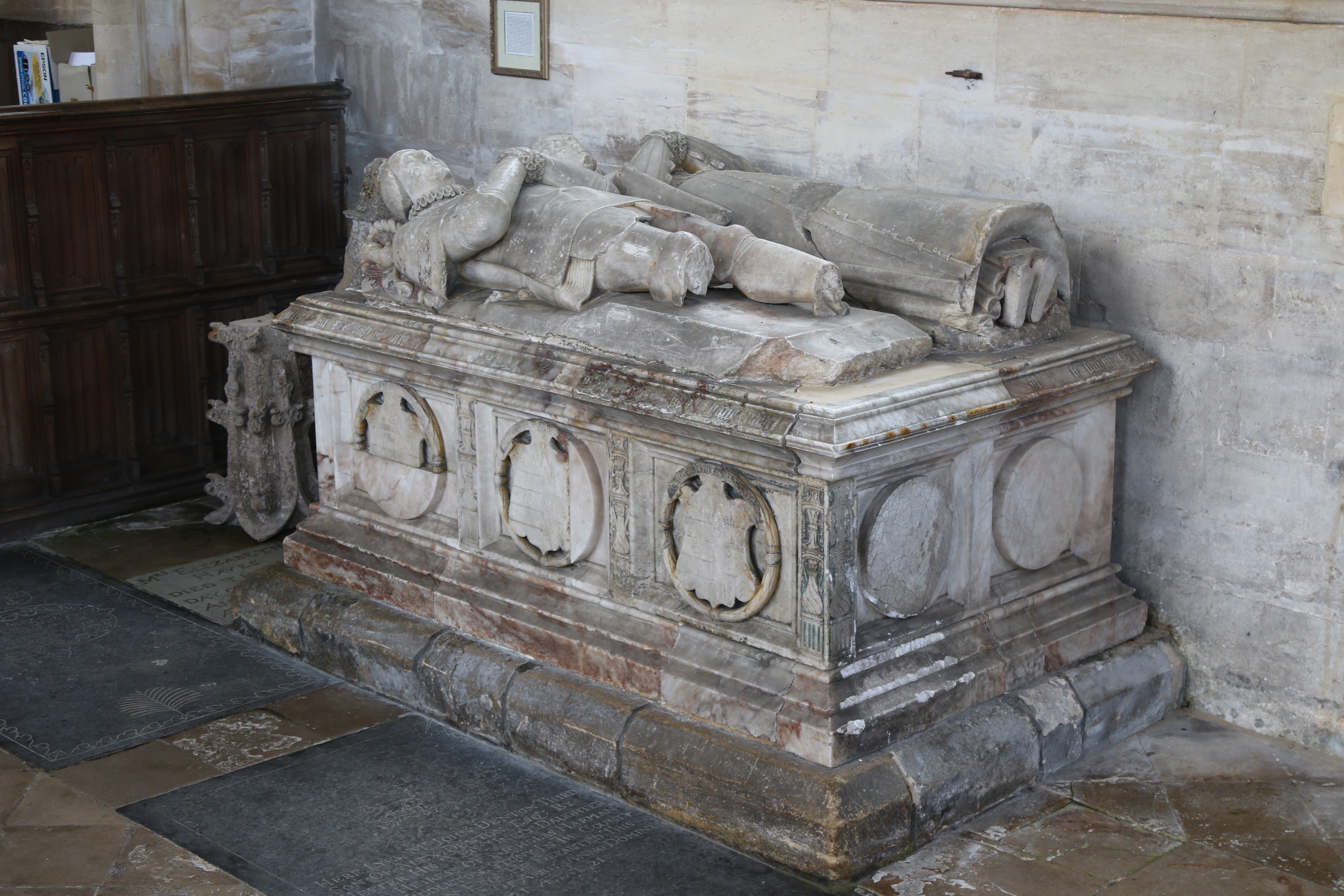
Monument with effigies of Thomas Denton and his wife in All Saints' Church, Hillesden

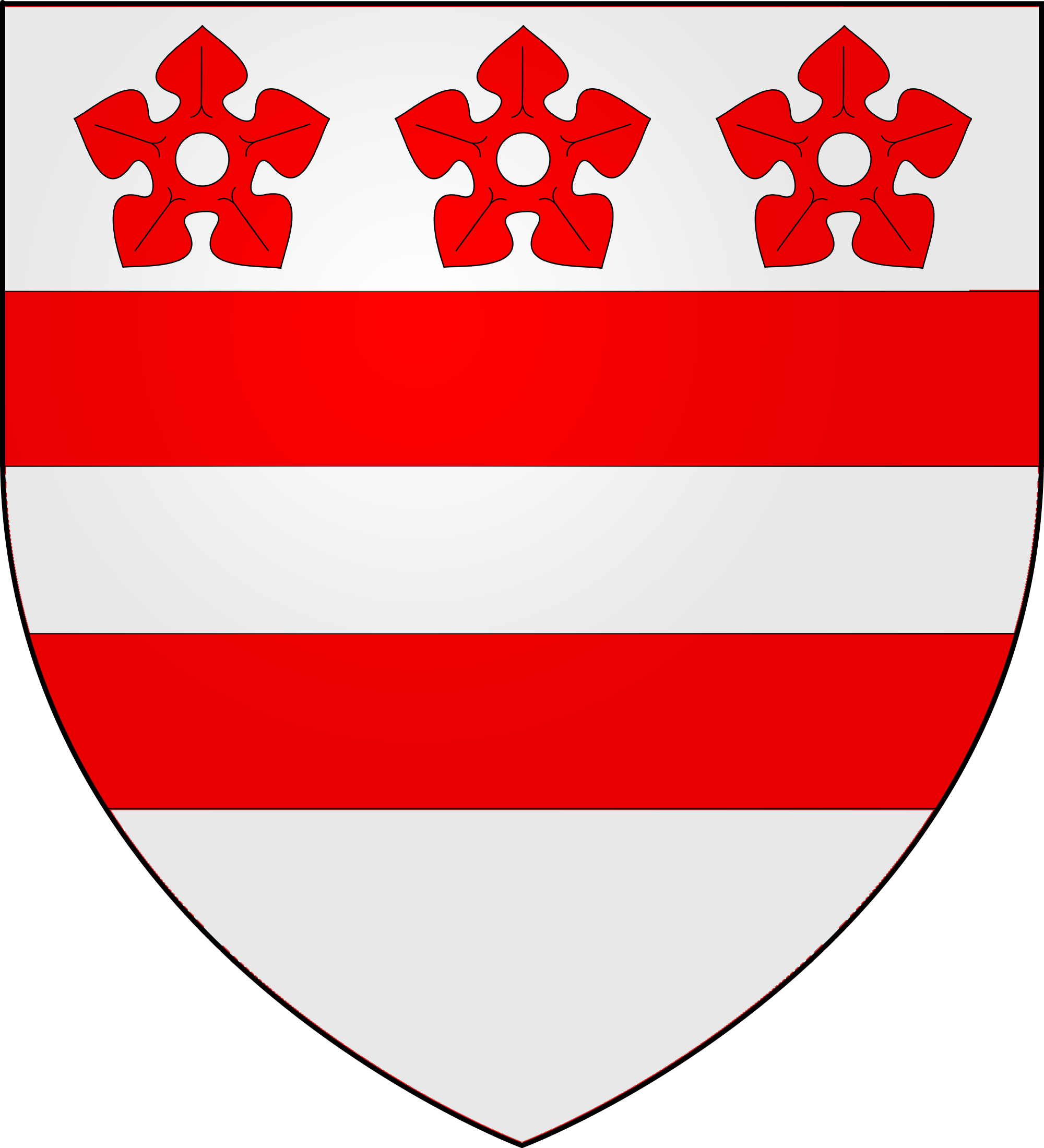
Arms of Denton of Hillesden: Argent, two bars gules in chief three cinquefoils of the second

Thomas Denton (before 1515 – 3 October 1558) was an English lawyer and politician, a Member of Parliament from 1536 until his death in 1558. He was elected, consecutively, by six parliamentary constituencies: Wallingford (1536), Oxford (1539), Berkshire (1547), Banbury (April 1554), Buckinghamshire (November 1554) and Oxfordshire (1558). Denton and Henry Stafford sponsored the creation of the parliamentary constituency in Banbury (1554). Denton's "electoral mobility" was, most likely, influenced by his speculation in land.

== Biography ==
Thomas Denton, second son of Thomas Denton of Caversfield, and junior brother to Sir John Denton, settled for a career in law. He was sent to the Middle Temple shortly before his father's death. Details of his admission and graduation were lost, but it known that in 1540 he was summoned to report the affairs of the Inns of Court to King Henry VIII. Denton, Nicholas Bacon and Robert Cary proposed creation of a new educational college financed with the revenues of former monastic properties, but the king withheld the money and the plan did not take off. Presumably, his earlier services to the King and Thomas Cromwell were rewarded by his first parliamentary appointment in 1536. Denton, who owned property in Wallingford, and was presumably the mayor of the town, replaced former MP Sir Edward Chamberlain. Denton, like Chamberlain, served without wages.

Three years later Denton became an MP for Oxford. The records for 1542 and 1545 elections for Oxford and Wallingford were lost, and, according to Bindoff et al., it is very likely that Denton represented either of these constituencies. It is known, however, that in 1547 he was chosen to represent Berkshire, and remained MP for Berkshire until his voluntary leave of absence in February 1552.

Denton stayed aside from the political crisis of 1553. Instead of active politics, he and Sir Henry Stafford quietly worked towards creation of a new parliamentary constituency for Banbury. It was officially created in January 1554, and in April Denton and Sir Edmund Peckham became the first MPs for Banbury. One year later they both failed to show up for a House session and were prosecuted at the King's Bench, with no lasting consequences for Denton. He actively participated in the Middle Temple affairs and was elected its treasurer in 1556.

In 1558 Denton won his last election, for Oxfordshire, where his brother was the returning officer.

According to archival records, Denton possessed properties in London, Berkshire, Buckinghamshire, Cheshire, Gloucestershire, Norfolk, Northamptonshire and Oxfordshire. He eventually settled in Hillesden, Buckinghamshire and passed his fortunes to his only son Alexander Denton (d.1576). The Dentons of Hillesden routinely represented Buckinghamshire in the Parliament during the 17th century, were prosecuted as royalists and became extinct in 1714.

== See also ==
- William Denton, unrelated to Dentons of Caversfield, MP for Midhurst in 1553–1565
