= Millais baronets =

Baronetcy in the Baronetage of the United Kingdom

- Escutcheon of the Millais baronets of Palace Gate and St Quen
- Creation date: 1885
- Status: extant
- Motto: Ars longa, vita brevis, Art endureth, life is short

The Millais Baronetcy, of Palace Gate in Kensington in the County of Middlesex and of St Ouen in Jersey, is a title in the Baronetage of the United Kingdom. It was created on 16 July 1885 for the painter and illustrator John Everett Millais, later President of the Royal Academy.

== Millais baronets, of Palace Gate and St Quen (1885) ==
- Sir John Everett Millais, 1st Baronet (1829–1896)
- Sir Everett Millais, 2nd Baronet (1856–1897)
- Sir John Everett Millais, 3rd Baronet (1888–1920)
- Sir Geoffroy William Millais, 4th Baronet (1863–1941)
- Sir Ralph Regnault Millais, 5th Baronet (1905–1992)
- Sir Geoffroy Richard Everett Millais, 6th Baronet (born 1941)

The heir presumptive to the baronetcy is John Frederic Millais b. 1949, cousin of the 6th Baronet.

Baronetage of the United Kingdom
Preceded by Martin baronets	Millais baronets of Palace Gate and St Quen; 16 July 1885	Succeeded by Errington baronets
