= Sir Mordaunt Martin, 4th Baronet =

- Baronet
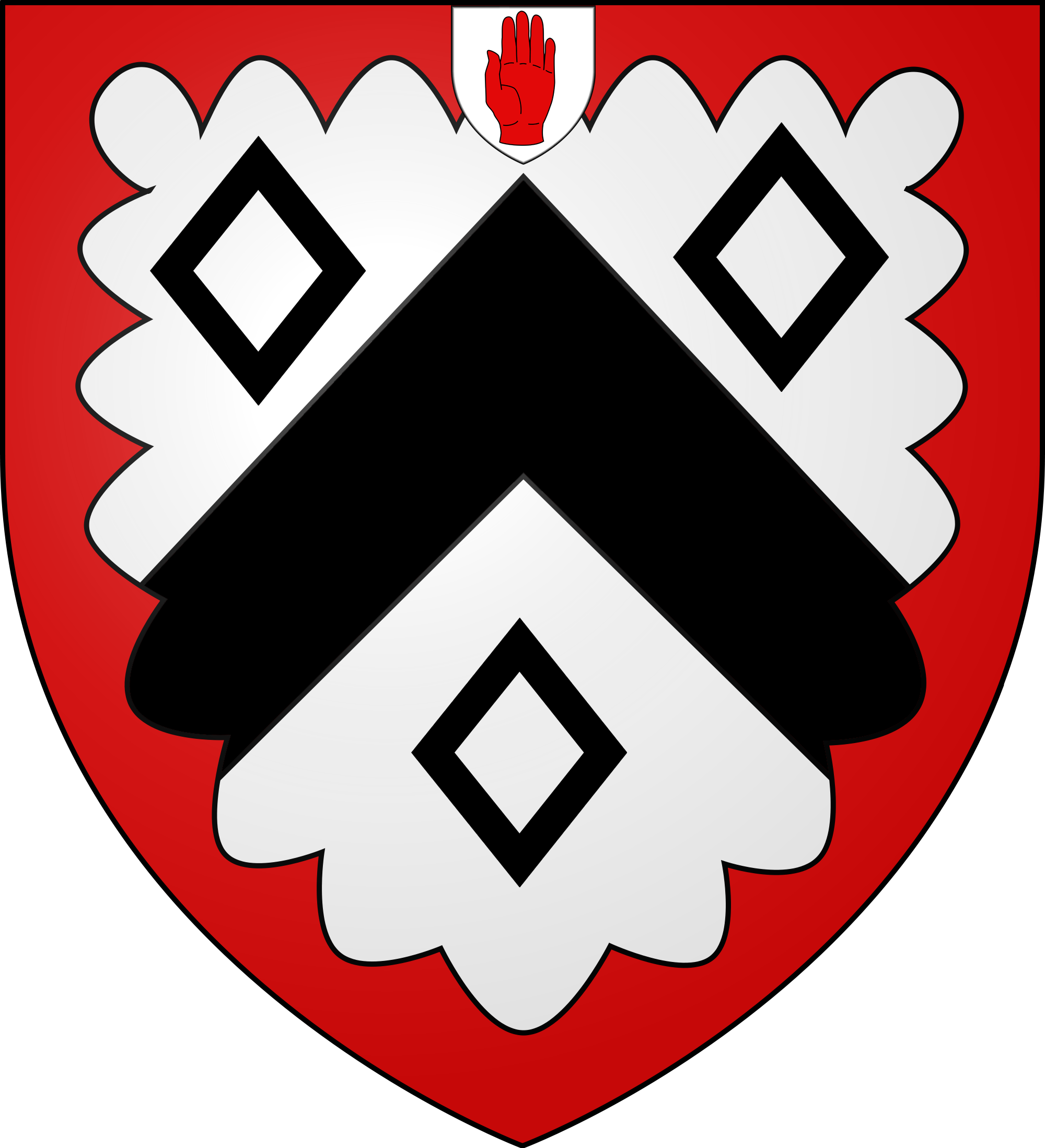
- Coat of arms of the Martins of Long Melford. Argent, a chevron between three mascles Sable within a bordure engrailed Gules. The red hand on an escutcheon signifies the arms of a baronet
- Born: 1740
- Died: 24 September 1815 (aged 74–75)
- Noble family: Martin of Long Melford
- Spouses: Everilda-Dorothea Smith; Catherine Styleman
- Issue: Sophia Elizabetha Martin; Everilda-Dorothea Martin; Mordaunt Martin; Anna-Maria Martin; Louisa Mary Ann Martin; Mordaunt Martin; Caroline Martin; Frances Martin; Sir Roger Martin, 5th Baronet; Catherine Martin
- Father: Sir Roger Martin, 3rd Baronet
- Mother: Sophia Mordaunt

Sir Mordaunt Martin, 4th Baronet (c. 1740 – 24 September 1815) was son of Sir Roger Martin, 3rd Baronet and Sophia Mordaunt. He inherited his baronetcy from his father, who was the third Martin Baronet, upon his death in 1762. He lived in Burnham Market in Norfolk

== Career ==
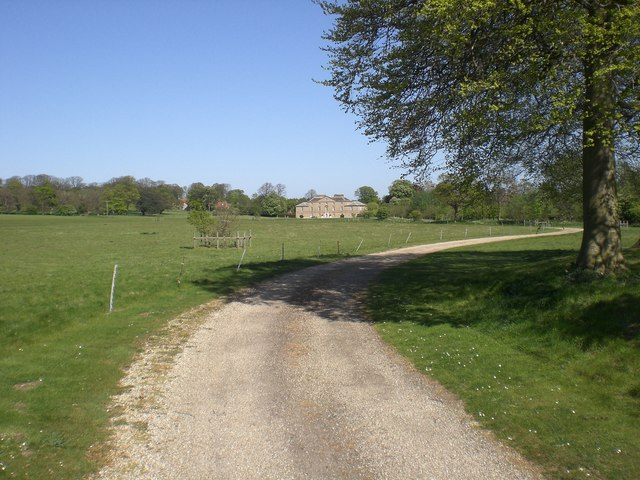
Burnham Westgate Hall

Sir Mordaunt was a marshal of the vice admiralty court in Jamaica.

In 1808 he purchased Burnham Westgate Hall, which he built onto. In particular he built a number of farm buildings. A keen agriculturalist, he wrote many letters and articles on the relative benefits of the mangel wurzel as a crop and is documented as the first person to introduce the plant, as well as sainfoin to the county and greatly improved the growth of potatoes and other vegetables. On his death he left the hall-described by White as "a hand-some mansion, beautified with pleasure grounds and shrubberies, and situated near the church", to his son and heir Roger

A portion of his early life was passed in the army, and he retained to his last moments that high sense of honour which a military-education so frequently instils. He was remarkable for generosity of sentiment, as well as liberality to those that were within reach of his bounty. He was benevolent to all, warmly loyal to his King, and regular in the service of God. He passed the last 50 years of his life in retirement at Burnham, devoting his time principally to the study and practice of agriculture.

— The Gentleman's Magazine, Obituary; with anecdotes of remarkable persons, 25 September 1815

== Personal life ==
On 29 July 1765 Sir Mordaunt married Everilda-Dorothea Smith (1743 – 21 September 1800), daughter of the Reverend William Smith rector of Burnham Market and by her had three sons and seven daughters:

- Sophia Elizbetha Martin (c. 1766 – 18 November 1827), died unmarried.
- Everilda-Dorothea Martin (5 June 1767 – 27 November 1839), married Rev. Thomas Bernard and by him had five sons.
- Mordaunt Martin (February 1769 – 25 November 1769), died an infant.
- Anna-Maria Martin (c. 1770 – 1853), married Rev. John Glasse rector of Burnham.
- Louisa Mary Ann Martin (baptised 20 August 1771) married Captain Isaac Wolley, RN.
- Mordaunt Martin (baptised 29 October 1772 - buried 10 June 1773), died an infant.
- Caroline Martin (1773 – 3 June 1848), married Rev. James Monroe of Monken Hadley in Middlesex and by him had one son.
- Frances Martin (c. 1775 – 27 July 1802), died unmarried.
- Sir Roger Martin, 5th Baronet (22 February 1778 – 15 December 1854), married Mary Ann Clark and was without issue.
- Catherina Martin

Governess to the family's first six daughters from 1775 to 1780 was a very young Jane Arden, the first friend of Mary Wollstonecraft. She later set up a school and published educational works as Jane Gardiner. She named her daughter Everilda, very likely after Lady Martin. Governesses were often isolated and oppressed, but the Martins treated her well – on a return visit, "more as a daughter than as an humble 'gouvernante' ... I am in the very height of enjoyment in this charming family, their society is so refined, so intellectual!"

Burnham was within visiting distance of Houghton Hall, then in the possession of Horace Walpole; the Martins took their former employee to admire the famous collection of paintings there.

Sir Mordaunt remarried on 4 August 1808 to Catherine (21 July 1759 – 29 April 1825), daughter of Rev. Armine Styleman and widow of Rev. Edward North, with whom he had no children and who survived him. He died on 24 September 1815, when his title passed to his eldest son. Sir Mordaunt was buried in Burnham Westgate Church with his first wife Everilda-Dorothea.

Baronetage of England
Preceded by Roger Martin	Baronet (of Long Melford); 1762–1815	Succeeded by Roger Martin
