= Burnham Westgate Hall =

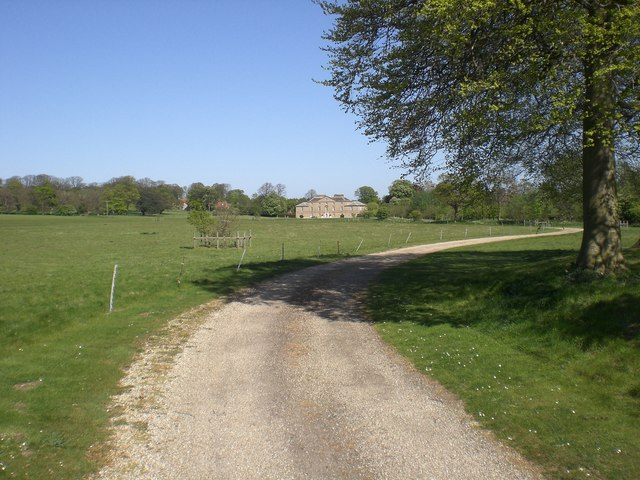
- The Hall and its surrounding parkland

- Location within Norfolk

General information
- Type: Country house
- Architectural style: Georgian, Palladian
- Location: Burnham Market, Norfolk, England
- Coordinates: 52.945788°N 0.722072°E
- Completed: 18th century

Technical details
- Floor area: 15,870

Design and construction
- Architect: Matthew Brettingham
- Other designers: John Soane

Listed Building – Grade II*
- Official name: Burnham Westgate Hall
- Designated: 5 June 1953
- Reference no.: 1274350

Burnham Westgate Hall is a Georgian country house near Burnham Market, Norfolk, about 2 mi (3.2 km) south of the north Norfolk coast. It was remodelled in Palladian style in the 1780s by John Soane: it was Soane's first substantial country house commission, immediately before he started Letton Hall in 1784.

It was used to train domestic servants in the 1930s and 1940s, before becoming a local authority old people's home from 1945 to 1990. It has been a Grade II* listed building since 1953.

It returned to use as a domestic house under the ownership of Patricia Rawlings and her partner Paul Zuckerman in 1991. It was put up for sale for £10 million in 2012, and there was speculation that it might be bought by Johnny Depp, but ultimately it was not sold then. It was put up for sale again in 2019, for £7 million and again in 2020 for £4.5 million.

== Background ==
The previous building on the site, Polstede Hall, had been built in the 1750s by Matthew Brettingham for Pinckney Wilkinson. Brettingham's house resembled a wing of the nearby Holkham Hall. Wilkinson gave the house to his daughter Anne when she married Thomas Pitt in 1783. Thomas Pitt was the nephew of the Prime Minister William Pitt, 1st Earl of Chatham and a cousin of William Pitt the Younger; he became the 1st Baron Camelford in 1784.

The current house was remodelled in 1783-1785 in Palladian style by John Soane, who also added stables and lodge. It is, however, possible that the quite conservative interior remodelling work was done by Norwich builder and sculptor John de Carle (1750-1828) and Lord Camelford to Soane's designs: de Carle supplied at least one of the fireplaces. It has been considered a smaller version of Holkham Hall nearby. Soane also added a split cantilevered staircase, and the piano nobile on the first floor. Pitt likened his new house to the Palazzo Pitti.

== Description ==
The Hall has three storeys, with about 15,870 sq ft (1,474 m^{2}) of living space, and seven bays on the main west elevation, and three on the north and south side returns. It is built of plain Gault bricks, with stone plinth, dressings and platbands between the ground and first floor, and slate roofs. The three-storey, five-bay centre block is surmounted by a three-bay triangular pediment, with a moulded brick modillion eaves cornice, and two long low chimneystacks. The three central bays have two ground floor windows, either side of a central c.1949 neo-Georgian replacement porch, with three windows on the first and second floors.

Most of the windows are sashes with glazing bars, under flat rubbed brick arches. Those on the first floor have a stone balustrade recessed between the two stone platbands running across the façade. The central window, above the porch, also has a stucco architrave with console brackets, and a segmental pediment. The second floor central window has a stucco rectangular architrave surround, and there is a fixed sash in the centre of the pediment.

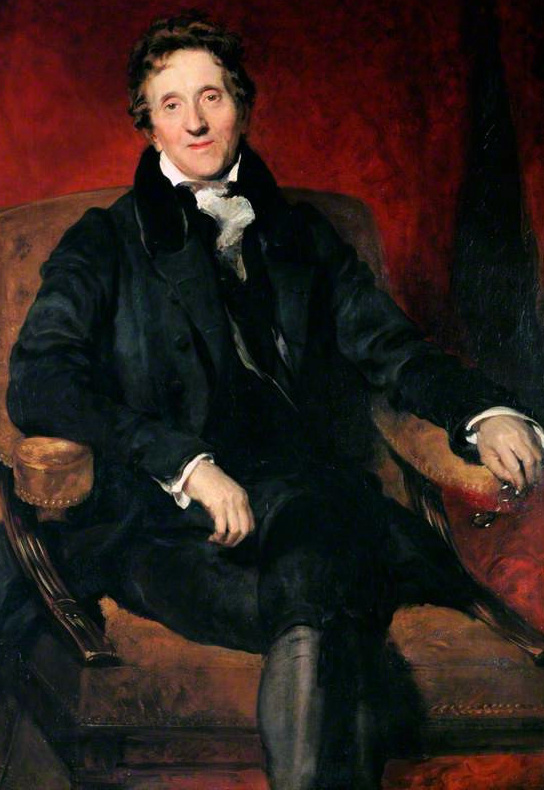
Sir John Soane, remodelled the interior of the Hall in the mid 1780s

The flanking bays of the central block are slightly recessed, with one sash window on each floor under flat rubbed brick arches. At second floor above the outer wings the corners are further recessed, with a low parapet around the slate roof. To either side is a two-storey single bay wing, brought forward in line with the pedimented central bays.

The wings have single ground and first floor sash windows, with continuations of the ground floor plinth and first floor platbands, and their own modillion eaves cornice, and hipped roofs. Each side elevation has a three-bay return with windows on the ground and first floor, stone platbands, and eaves cornice. The northern return has an extra fourth window inserted at the eastern end.

Nowadays, the main reception rooms are on the ground floor, in a series of enfilades, with the large saloon on the first floor. Original features include plaster mouldings, bolection moulded fireplaces, and rococo wood carvings. The cantilevered Imperial staircase, added by Soane, has stone treads and a cast iron baluster, leads to the piano nobile on the first floor, decorated with carved wooden fittings and moulded plaster cornices. It has 13 bedrooms, with six main bedrooms, seven bathrooms and two dressing rooms on the first floor, and seven more bedrooms and five bathrooms on the second floor. The 18th-century Italian wall-paintings were removed from the salon c. 1949.

In the grounds is a three-bedroom lodge. A winterbourne chalk stream, the Goose Beck, occasionally runs through the southern part of the park and gardens: when it appears, it drains east through the village of Burnham Market towards the River Burn. A bowl barrow located within the halls parkland is a scheduled monument.

== History ==
On the death of Thomas Pitt, 1st Baron Camelford, in 1793, the Hall was inherited by his son, also Thomas, and then in 1804 by his daughter Anne, who had married William Grenville, 1st Baron Grenville. It was sold in 1808 to Sir Mordaunt Martin, 4th Baronet, who constructed agricultural outbuildings. It was inherited on his death in 1815 by his son Sir Roger Martin, 5th Baronet, who died unmarried in 1854.

It passed through several local families until 1920, when the Cook family sold most of the land apart from the hall and 7 acres (2.8 ha) of gardens and grounds. The Hall was donated to the Women's Section of the Royal British Legion in 1933 as a war memorial, to be used to train young ladies as domestic servants. It was sold to Norfolk County Council after the Second World War. The council removed 18th-century Italian wall-paintings and the chandelier from the saloon. It was used as an old people's home from 1945 until it was closed in 1990 as being too expensive to maintain and run. The council's first attempt to sell the hall attracted no offers.

The Hall was sold for less than £1 million in 1991 to Patricia Rawlings (who became Baroness Rawlings in 1994) and her partner Paul Zuckerman, who renovated the building as a private dwelling. They opened up blocked fireplaces, removed grab rails, and lifted linoleum to reveal the original oak floorboards and parquet floors. They also increased the land attached to the house again, by buying a neighbouring plot of 28 acres (11 ha) from a local farmer, and also bought back the walled kitchen garden.

The House and its 38 acres (15 ha) garden and grounds were listed for sale for £7 million in 2012. It was speculated in the press that it might be bought by Johnny Depp for about £6.5m. In the event, the house was not sold at that time. It was relisted for sale in 2019, with the price reduced to £3.8m plus overage (but excluding 8 acres, the coach house and lodge).
