= Norfolk Burnhams =

Group of villages in Norfolk, United Kingdom

Coordinates: 52.951°N 0.740°E

The Norfolk Burnhams are a group of adjacent villages on the north coast of Norfolk, England. The villages are located near a large natural bay named Brancaster Bay and the Scolt Head Island National Nature Reserve.

A medieval verse speaks of "London York and Coventry and the Seven Burnhams by the sea". The Domesday Book of 1086 also mentions some of the Burnhams (see external links). At one time there were indeed seven Burnham villages, all within a radius of two miles. These were:

- Burnham Deepdale
- Burnham Norton
- Burnham Overy
- Burnham Sutton
- Burnham Thorpe
- Burnham Ulph
- Burnham Westgate

Hence the mnemonic for the seven Burnhams: Nelson Of Thorpe Died Well Under Sail.

It is thought that Burnham Market is one of the original seven Burnhams, but this is incorrect. Burnham Market is a modern merging of three Burnhams: Burnham Sutton, Burnham Westgate and Burnham Ulph. Over the years those three central villages have merged to form the larger village and civil parish of Burnham Market, which forms the principal centre for the Burnhams and several other nearby villages. The most westerly of the villages, Burnham Deepdale, has more or less merged with the neighbouring village of Brancaster Staithe, and both are now part of the civil parish of Brancaster.

Burnham Norton and Burnham Thorpe still exist as separate villages and civil parishes, much as they always have. Burnham Overy is still a single civil parish, but in modern times a distinction is often made between the two settlements of Burnham Overy Town (actually a small settlement adjacent to the parish church) and Burnham Overy Staithe (a rather larger settlement about a mile away and next to the creek-side harbour).

The Burnhams are all located either on the River Burn, or adjacent to its mouth, and the name Burnham may derive from this.

Burnhamthorpe Road in Toronto and Mississauga, Ontario, Canada was named after Burnham Thorpe.
