= Sir Roger Martin, 1st Baronet =

- Baronet
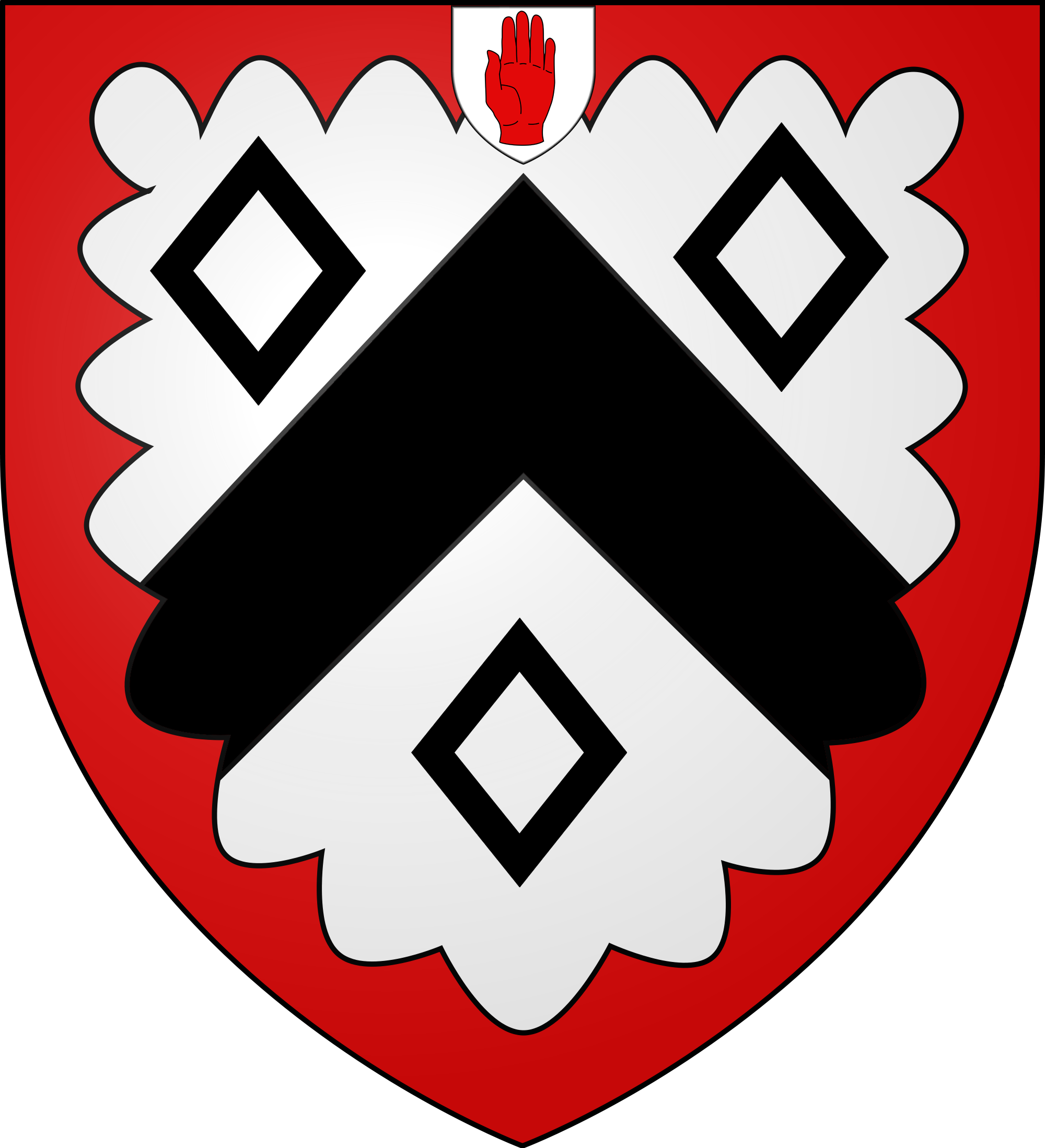
- Coat of arms of the Martins of Long Melford. Argent, a chevron between three mascles Sable within a bordure engrailed Gules. The red hand on an escutcheon signifies the arms of a baronet
- Born: 1639; Long Melford, Suffolk
- Died: 8 July 1712 (aged 72–73)
- Noble family: Martin of Long Melford
- Spouse: Tamworth Horner
- Issue: Tamworth Martin; Catherine Martin; Roger Martin; Sir Roger Martin, 2nd Baronet; Edward Martin; Henry Martin; John Martin; Francis Martin; Jermyn Martin; Joseph Martin; Jane Martin
- Father: Richard Martin
- Mother: Jane Bedingfield

Sir Roger Martin, 1st Baronet (c. 1639 – 8 July 1712) was son of Richard Martin and Jane, daughter of Sir Henry Bedingfield of Oxborough. He was created a baronet 28 March 1667 and was the first of the five Martin Baronets of Long Melford.

== Personal life ==
In 1663 Sir Roger married Tamworth Horner (d. 15 August 1698), daughter of Edward Horner Esq. of Mells, Somerset and by her had eight sons and three daughters:

- Tamworth Martin (b. 1664) married Thomas Rookwood, Esq. and died giving birth to their only daughter, Elizabeth.
- Catherine Martin (b. 1666)
- Roger Martin (b. 1666) died in infancy
- Sir Roger Martin, 2nd Baronet (1667 – 3 March 1742) married Anna-Maria Harvey
- Edward Martin (1673 – 1710)
- Henry Martin (1674 – 1710)
- John Martin (1676 – 1715)
- Francis Martin (b. 1683) died in infancy
- Jermyn Martin (b. 1685) died in infancy
- Joseph Martin (1688 – 1715)
- Jane Martin (1688)

He died 8 July 1712 and was buried four days later in the cemetery of Holy Trinity Church in Long Melford.

Baronetage of England
New creation	Baronet (of Long Melford); 1667 – 1712	Succeeded by Roger Martin
