= Burnham Market =

Burnham Markets history of fairs and markets - a chronology

Coordinates: 52.946°N 0.728°E

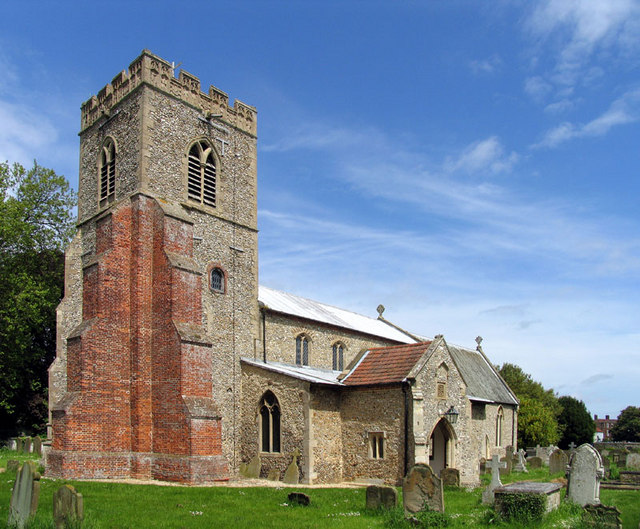
- St Mary's Church

- Location within Norfolk
- Area: 18.43 km^{2} (7.12 sq mi)
- Population: 724 (2021)
  - Density: 39/km^{2} (100/sq mi)
- OS grid reference: TF834422
- Civil parish: Burnham Market
- District: King's Lynn and West Norfolk
- Shire county: Norfolk
- Region: East
- Country: England
- Sovereign state: United Kingdom
- Post town: KING'S LYNN
- Postcode district: PE31
- Dialling code: 01328
- Police: Norfolk
- Fire: Norfolk
- Ambulance: East of England
- UK Parliament: North West Norfolk

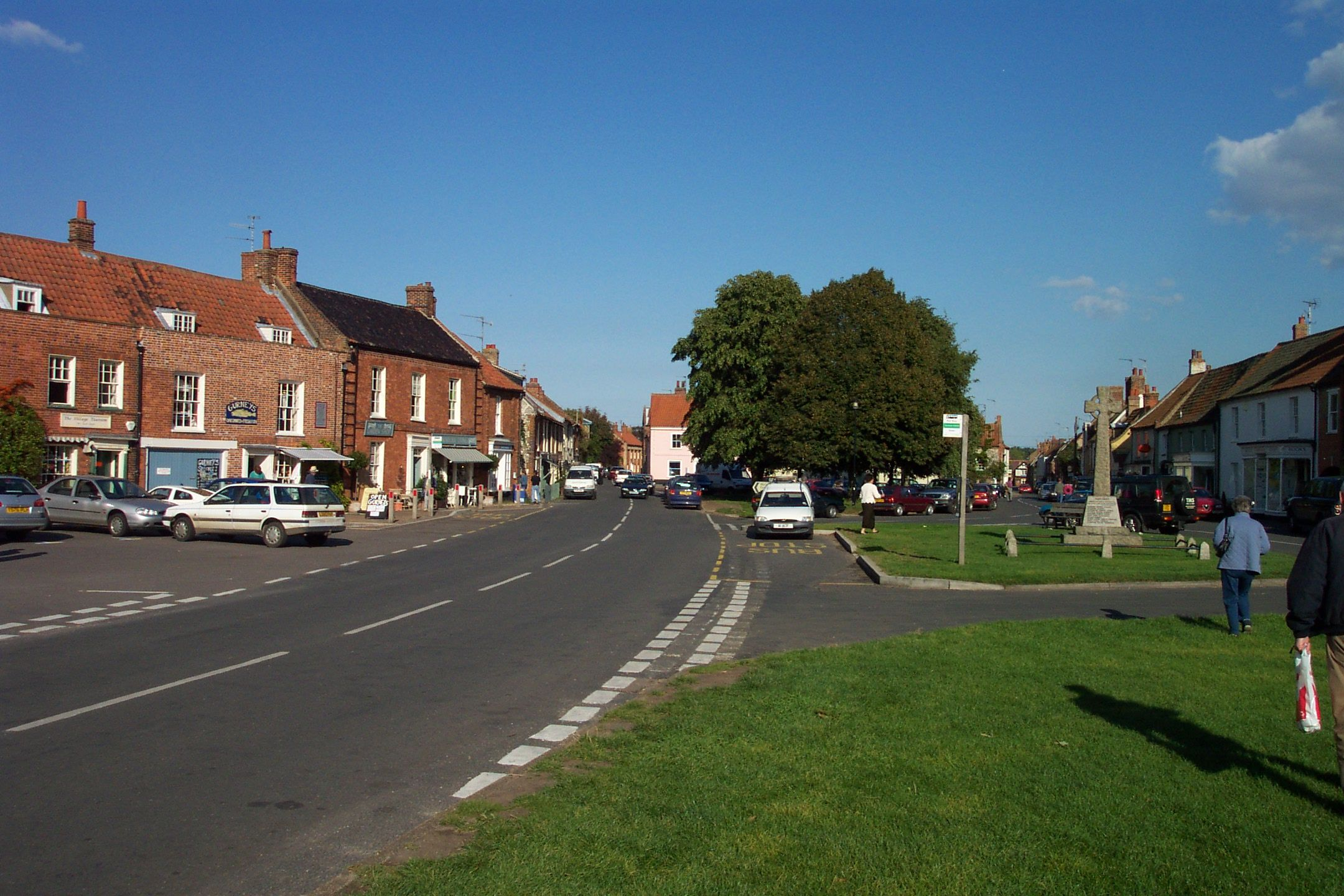
The village green

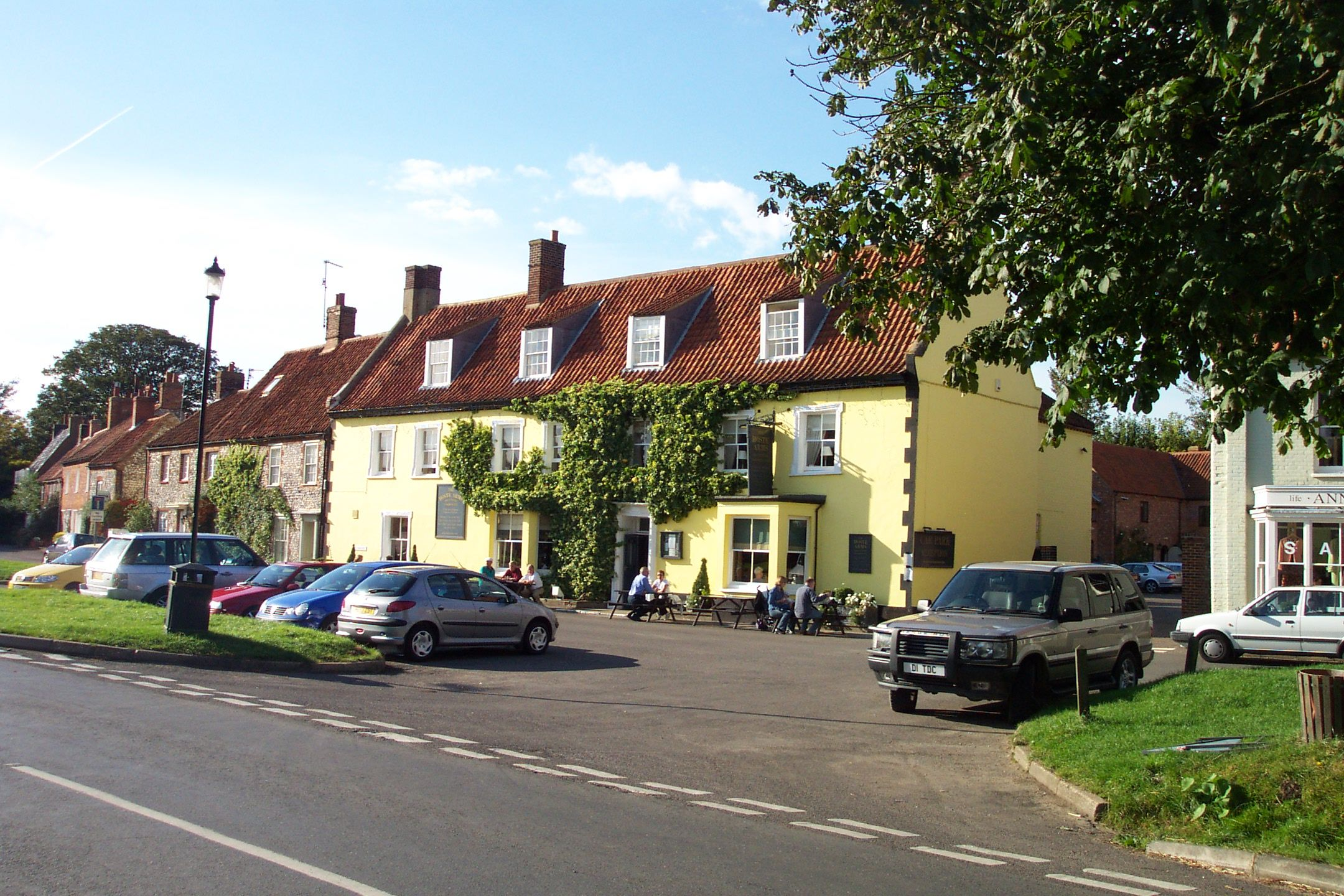
The Hoste Arms

Burnham Market is a village and civil parish in the English county Norfolk. It is 19 miles (31 km) north-east of King's Lynn and 32 miles (51 km) north-west of Norwich.

It is one of the Norfolk Burnhams. Three settlements, Burnham Sutton, Burnham Ulph, and Burnham Westgate, merged to form Burnham Market. In 2020 it was rated among the "20 most beautiful villages in the UK and Ireland" by Condé Nast Traveler.

== History ==
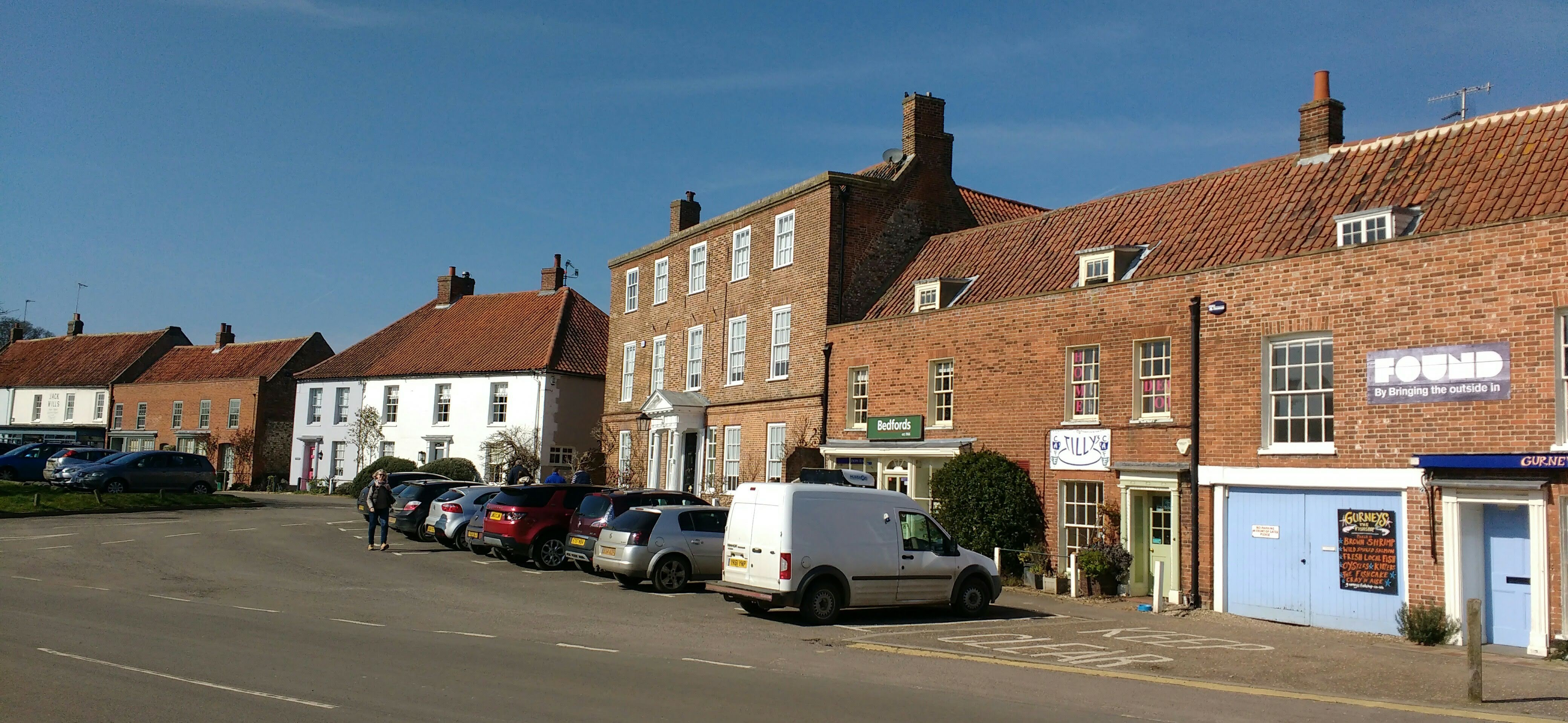
Burnham Market in the district of King's Lynn and West Norfolk

Burnham Market's name is of Anglo-Saxon origin, although the village is not listed in the Domesday Book.

In 1952, the West Norfolk Junction Railway, which ran through the village, was closed. This railway had linked with Holkham, Wells-next-the-Sea, Hunstanton and Kings Lynn. station still stands on the road to North Creake.

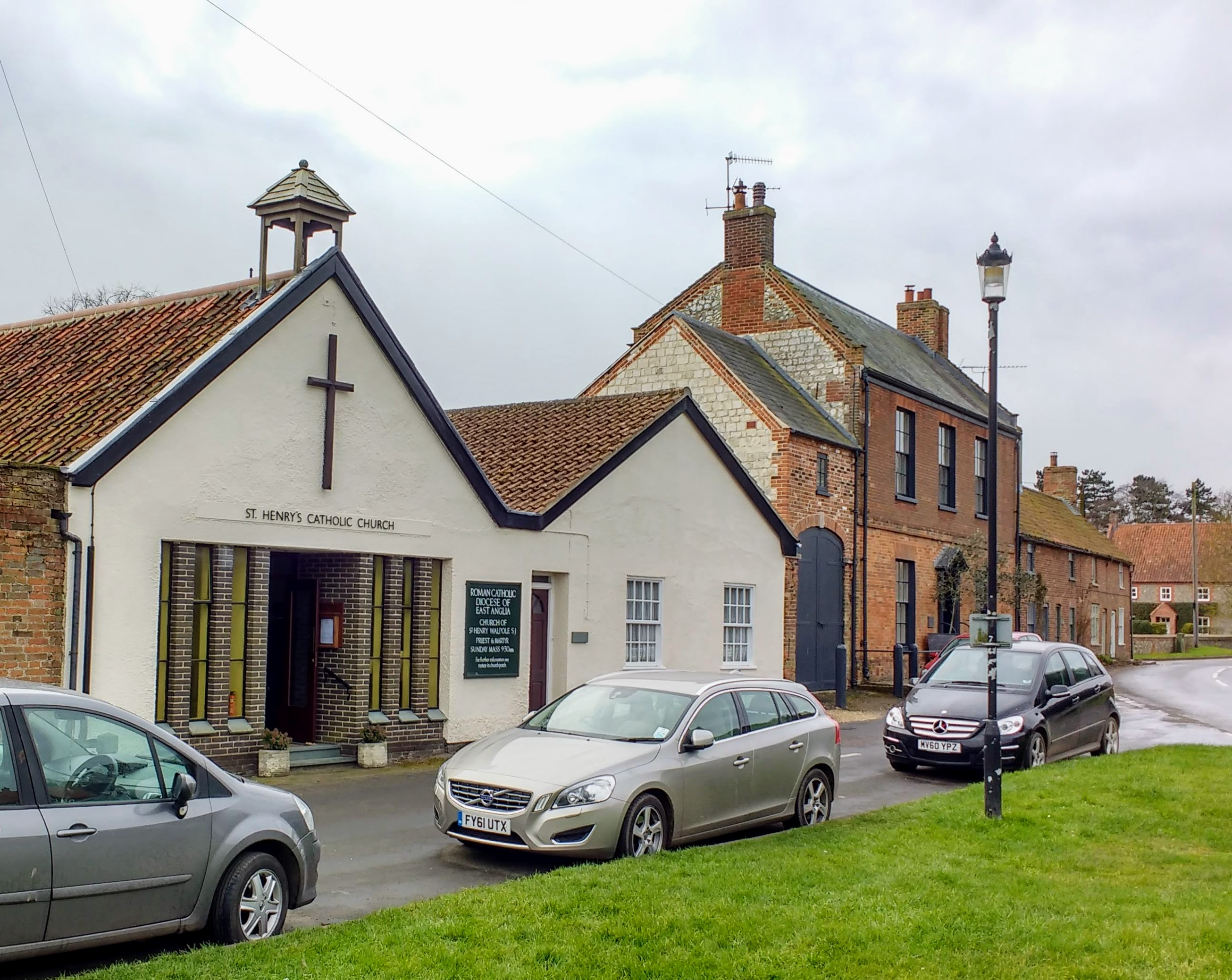
St Henry Walpole Catholic Church, Burnham Market in the Diocese of East Anglia

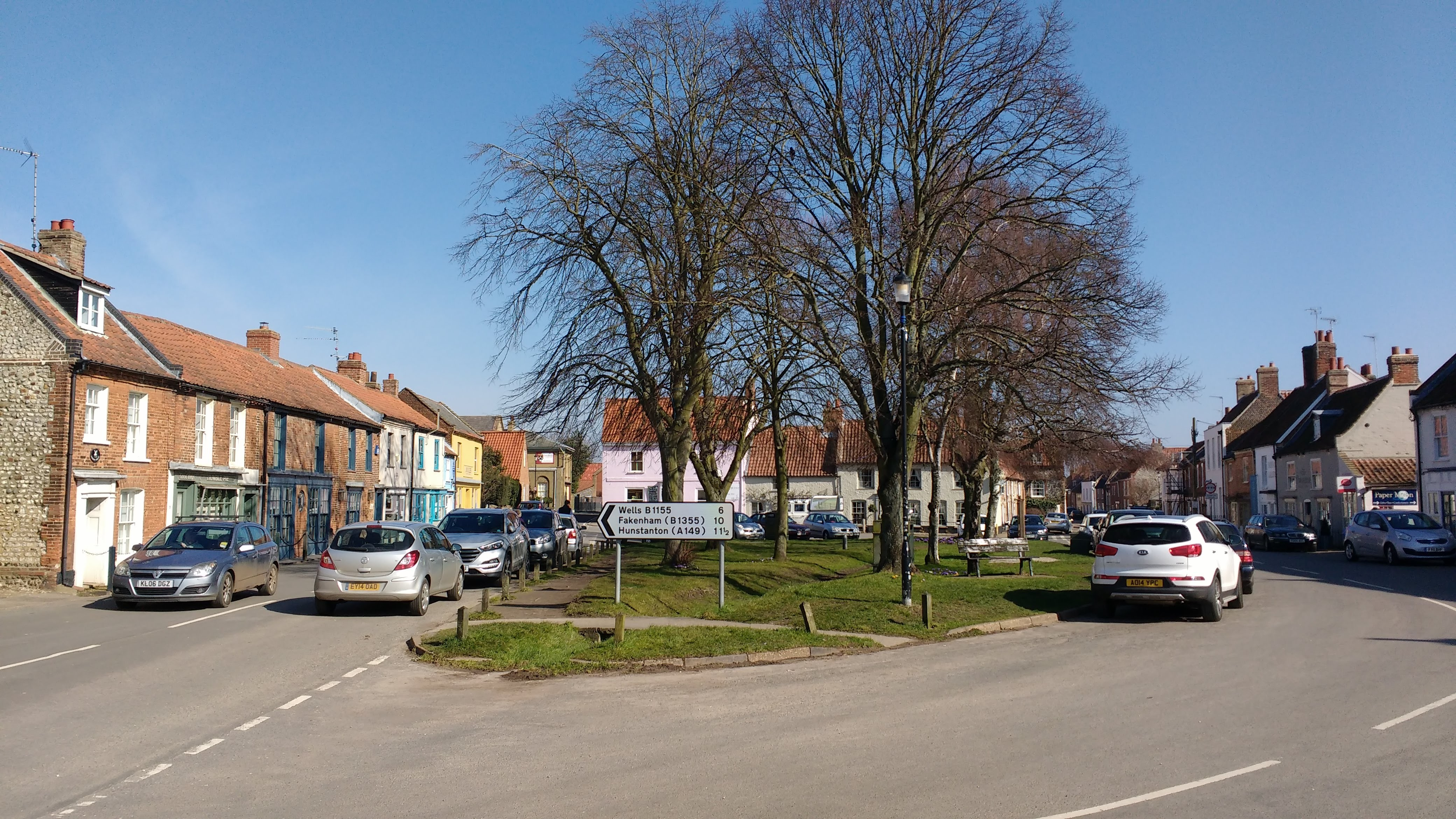
Burnham Market

Burnham Westgate Hall is a Grade II listed country house built in the 1780s by Sir John Soane for Thomas Pitt, 1st Baron Camelford. The Hall was built on the existing Polstede Hall, which had been built in the 1750s by Matthew Brettingham for Pinckney Wilkinson MP. In 1933, the Hall passed to the Royal British Legion and after the Second World War it was used as an old people's home. From 1990 onwards, it has become the private residence of Patricia Rawlings, Baroness Rawlings.

Burnham Market's Markets and Fairs : a Chronology

1100

Date of the Charter, grant or first mention of a market: Burnham Marlet 1100 (BO, 1217).

(Date of the charter, grant or first mention of a fair: BO, 1271; BT,1223; BS,1347). From Gazetteer of Markets and Fairs in England and Wales to 1516, (Kew 2005) accessed via BHO)

1272-1307 (reign of Edward I)

Blomefield’s History of Norfolk, under Burnham Westgate, mentions Sir William Calthorpe & Cecilia had a Saturday Market. Later these two plus Ralph de Hemenhale and his wife Emme, and John de Gymyngham had a weekly market, took stallage and a toll of every cart passing over the causey of Burnham. (The two women are probably sisters and heirs of Hugh de Candos of Burnham)

1322-30

Ancient deeds: Feoffment, John le Fuller to William Doble mentions highway from Brunham market to Holcham. (TNA E 40/13595)

1534

Ancient deeds: Feoffment, Thomas Jenyson of ‘Brunham Market’ to Richard Hoo, 1534. (TNA E 40/13128

1632:Royal Grant in perpetuity of Market and Fair in Burnham Westgate alias Burnham St Mary, Charles I to Edwad Rennicke (NRO WAL 770/4, 280X5.) Edward Rennicke had some connection to local manors in 1600s. Will of ‘Edward Renwick’ citizen and Merchant Taylor of London, 1639, mentions estate in Burnham. (NRO WAL 1496,291X1)

1635: Royal Copy Letters patent of Charles I, granting fair and market in Burnham Westgate. (NRO WAL 770/6, 280X5)

1690: Title deeds and related papers, James Gibson v John Frere junior, messages etc. and “fair of Burnham Westgate.” (NRO WAL 770/25, 280X6 )

1765: Fairs at Burnham held March 15^{th} for cheese etc., August 1^{st} for horses etc. Owens Book of Fairs, London 1765, p.53

1812: Overseers of the Poor, Burnham Westgate, account book 1772-1882: request for “all respectable inhabitants” to help parish constables during two nights during the fair in Burnham Westgate, 1812. (NRO PD 573/53)

1834: Fair at Burnham held on : Easter Monday for cheese etc, August 1^{st} for horses etc. Owen’s Book of Fairs, London ,p. 48.

1854: Market formerly held in Burnham Westgate, but has been discontinued several years. White’s History, Gazeteer, and Directory of Norfolk. p. 618

1958: East Anglian Film Archive cat. No. 1087 shows the livestock market and the auction

== Geography ==
At the 2011 census, Burnham Market had a population of 877, which fell to 724 people by the 2021 census.

Burnham Market is located at the junction between the B1155, between Great Bircham and Holkham, and B1355, between A148 and A149.

== Churches ==
Burnham Market is home to several churches.

St Mary's Church is of Norman origin and is dedicated to Mary, mother of Jesus. St Mary's was significantly remodelled in the 14th, 15th and 19th centuries and is currently a listed building. The church bells date to the 17th century.

All Saints' Church is of Norman origin and was heavily remodelled in the 14th century, with further minor alterations in the 19th century.

St Henry Walpole Catholic Church, Burnham Market's Catholic Church, was constructed in 1959 and is dedicated to Henry Walpole, an Elizabethan Catholic martyr. The church conducts weekly Mass on a Friday and Sunday.

== Notable people ==
- Sir Mordaunt Martin, 4th Baronet (1740-1815) nobleman, lived in Burnham Market.
- Sir Roger Martin, 5th Baronet (1778-1854) nobleman, lived in Burnham Market.
- Anne Elliot (1856-1941) novelist, lived in Burnham Sutton.
- Lady Margaret Douglas-Home (1906-1996) musician and writer, lived in Burnham Market.
- Major David Jamieson VC CVO (1920-2001) Army officer, died in Burnham Market.
- Patricia Rawlings, Baroness Rawlings (b.1939) politician, lives in Burnham Market.
- Sandra Chick (b.1947) hockey player, born in Burnham Market.
- Sonia Robertson (b.1947) hockey player, born in Burnham Market.
- Steve Deere (b.1948) footballer, born in Burnham Market.
