= Sir Roger Martin, 5th Baronet =

- Baronet
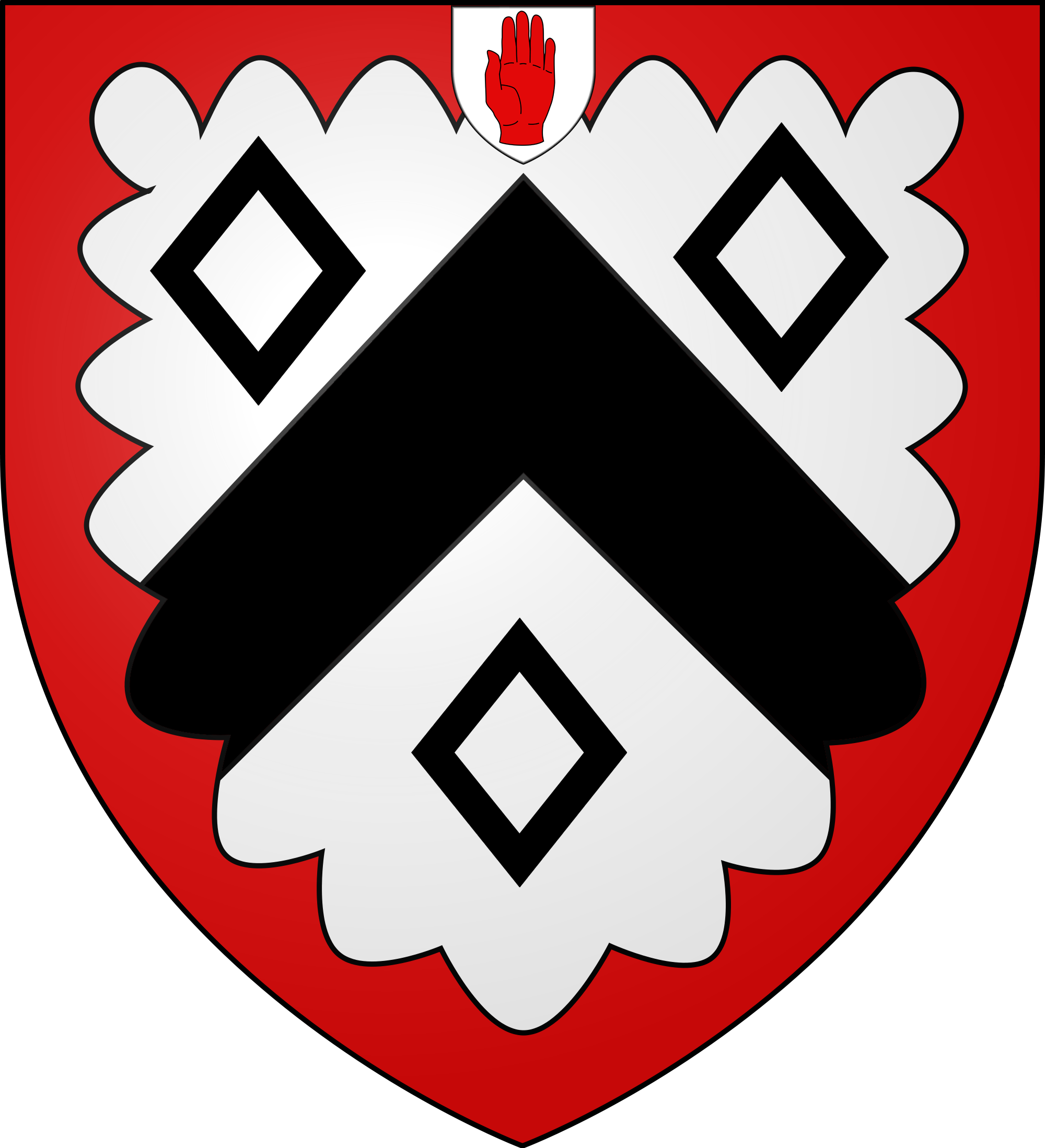
- Coat of arms of the Martins of Long Melford. Argent, a chevron between three mascles Sable within a bordure engrailed Gules. The red hand on an escutcheon signifies the arms of a baronet
- Born: 22 February 1778; Burnham Westgate Hall, Burnham Market, Norfolk
- Died: 15 December 1854 (aged 76); Burnham Westgate Hall, Burnham Market, Norfolk
- Noble family: Martin of Long Melford
- Father: Sir Mordaunt Martin, 4th Baronet
- Mother: Everilda-Dorothea Smith

Sir Roger Martin, 5th Baronet (22 February 1778 - 15 December 1854) was son of Sir Mordaunt Martin, 4th Baronet and Everilda-Dorothea Smith. He inherited his baronetcy from his father, who was the fourth Martin Baronet, upon his death in 1815. He lived in Burnham Market in Norfolk

== Career ==
Sir Roger was, from 1794 to at least 1833, a senior merchant and second judge in the court of appeal in Murshidabad, Bengal, India. He lived at Burnham Westgate Hall, which he inherited from his father and lived in until his death there in 1854.

== Personal life ==
Sir Roger had a mistress Mary Ann Clarke, but the couple were never married. Mary Ann did have a daughter, Ellen, and there is suggestion that she may have been an illegitimate child of Sir Roger. Ellen (c. 1827 - 17 January 1893) married John Overman, a farmer of Crabbe Hall, and was buried with him in the graveyard of Burnham Westgate church.

With no male heir, the title of Baronet was unable to be passed on and so became extinct on his death on 15 December 1854. As with his immediate family, Sir Roger was buried at Burnham Westgate church with his mistress.

Baronetage of England
Preceded by Mordaunt Martin	Baronet (of Long Melford); 1815 – 1854	Extinct
