= Sir Roger Martin, 2nd Baronet =

Roger Martin
- Baronet
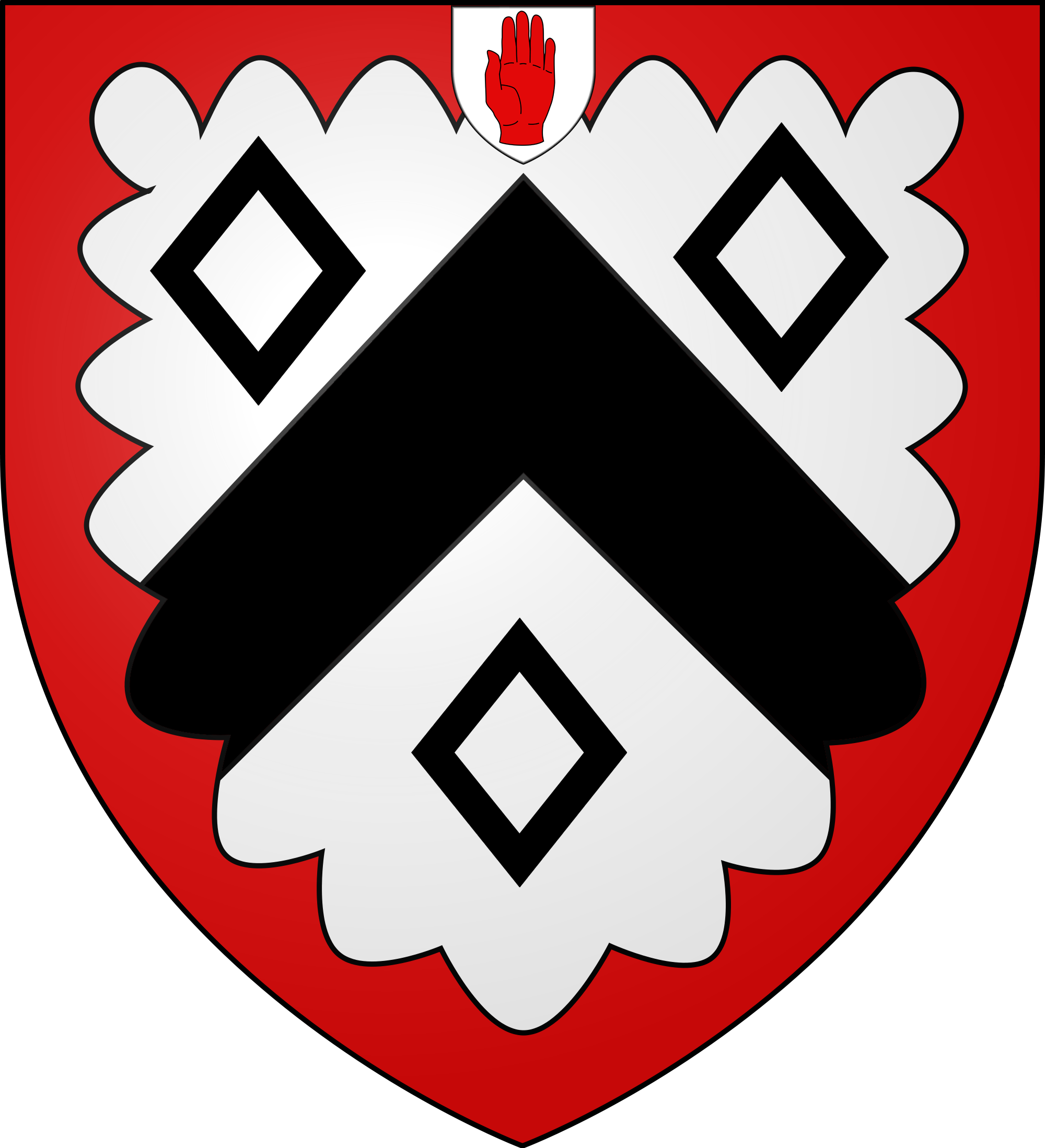
- Coat of arms of the Martins of Long Melford. Argent, a chevron between three mascles Sable within a bordure engrailed Gules. The red hand on an escutcheon signifies the arms of a baronet
- Born: 1667; Long Melford, Suffolk
- Died: 3 March 1742 (aged 74–75)
- Noble family: Martin of Long Melford
- Spouse: Anna-Marie Harvey
- Issue: Sir Roger Martin, 3rd Baronet; Richard Martin
- Father: Sir Roger Martin, 1st Baronet
- Mother: Tamworth Horner

Sir Roger Martin, 2nd Baronet (c. 1667 – 3 March 1742) was son of Sir Roger Martin, 1st Baronet and Tamworth, daughter of Edward Horner of Mells, Somerset. He inherited his baronetcy from his father, who was the first Martin Baronet of Long Melford created on 28 March 1667, upon his death in 1712.

== Personal life ==
Some time before 1689 Sir Roger married Anna-Marie Harvey (d. 15 May 1739) and by her had 2 sons:

- Sir Roger Martin, 3rd Baronet (1682 - 12 June 1762), who married Sophia Mordaunt, daughter of the honourable Brigadier General Lewis Mordaunt of Massingham in Norfolk.
- Richard Martin (1691 - After 1710)

The heraldic visitation of Suffolk in 1561 shows a third child:

- Elizabeth Martin, who married a gentleman called "Rookwood", who may have been a relation through her aunt Tamworth Martin who married Thomas Rookwood of Coldham Hall in Suffolk.

Sir Roger died on 3 March 1742, when his title passed to his eldest son.

Baronetage of England
Preceded by Roger Martin	Baronet (of Long Melford); 1712 – 1742	Succeeded by Roger Martin
