= Roger Martyn (lord mayor) =

English mercer and Lord Mayor of London

Sir Roger Martyn (or Martin) was a mercer and Lord Mayor of London in 1567; he was also Sheriff of London in 1559.

== The Examination of the Puritan Plumbers' Hall Congregation. ==
Due to his position as Lord Mayor of London in 1567, Sir Roger Martyn was present in his role as a high commissioner in the examination of a group of Puritans who had been accused of holding a conventicle in the Plumbers' Hall in June 1567. Also present at the examination were the Bishop of London, and Dean of Westminster. Also notably present at the examination was Edmund Bonner, an ex-bishop of London noted for his cruel treatment of protestants during Queen Mary I's reign. The document which tells us about the examination 'is the earliest surviving Puritan text of its kind and is a rare example of how the High Commission conducted an examination.' As a document it is revealing about the Vestments Controversy.

== Family ==
Sir Roger Martyn was born in Long Melford, Suffolk, to Lawrence Martyn and Elizabeth Cheke. Arms of "Sir Roger Martyn, Lord Mayor of London, 1567": Argent, on a chevron azure between three trefoils slipped per pale gules and vert as many bezants.

His first wife was Lettice Martin (née Pakington) who died 23 December 1553; his second wife was Elizabeth Martyn (née Castlyn).

Sir Roger Martyn had four children with his first wife; Humphrey, who married Alice Pullison, Edmund, who married Frances Martyn, Martha, who married John Castlyn, and Susan who married Robert Bye; with his second wife he had three children: Mary, who married Alexander Denton (d.1576), Joan, who married Anthony Smith, and Anne, who married Sir Anthony Culpeper.

Notable amongst Sir Roger Martyn's children was his daughter, Mary Martin; she was married to Alexander Denton in 1573 at the age of 15 and painted by George Gower to commemorate her marriage; the painting can still be seen today. In his will, Sir Roger Martyn left the pair a total of 113 pounds, six shillings and eight pence to be spent on finery. Also notable was his son, Humphrey Martyn, who was the addressee of the Langham Letter.

Sir Roger Martyn's will was witnessed by Thomas Knowles, his Son-in-Law (possibly a child his wife had given birth to before she was married to him), and overseers of his will were appointed as Robert Bye and John Castlyn, also Sons-in-Law, John Castlyn was the brother of Elizabeth Martyn, his wife, as well as being married to his daughter Martha Martyn, making him both a Son-in-Law and a Brother-in-Law to Sir Roger.

== Death ==
Sir Roger Martyn died in 1573 and it is unknown of what he died; he was buried in the Church of Saint Anthony. It is possible that his body was dug up and reburied in Brookwood Cemetery.
