= Roger Martin (recusant) =

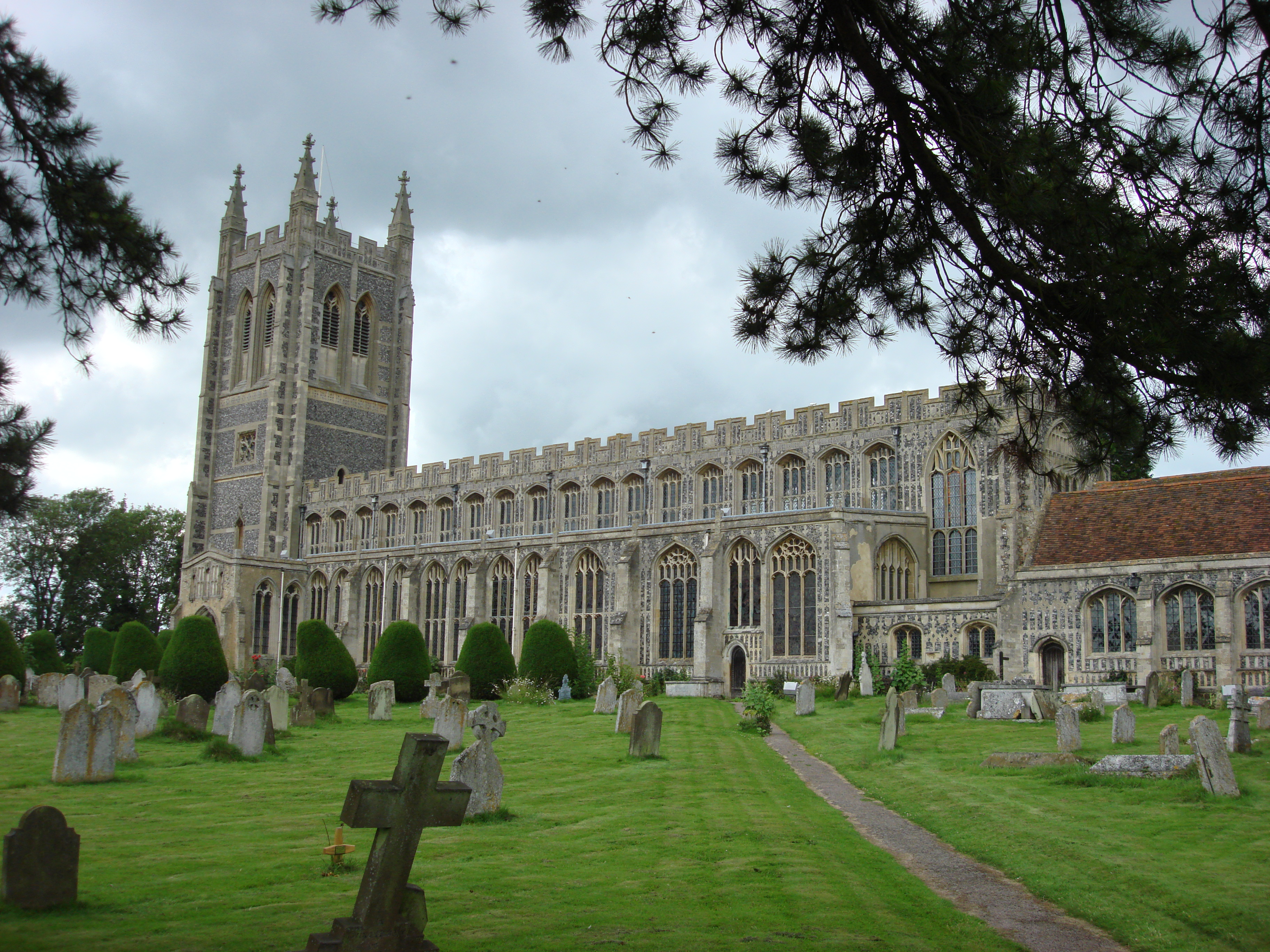
Holy Trinity Church, Long Melford.

Roger Martin (c. 1526/7 – 3 August 1615) was an English Catholic recusant and churchwarden of Holy Trinity Church, Long Melford, Suffolk from 1554 to 1558/9. He is chiefly known for his description of the pre-Reformation ceremonies and decorations of Holy Trinity Church.

As churchwarden during the reign of Queen Mary, Martin endeavoured to restore Catholic worship. Mary apparently offered him a Secretaryship of State, which he declined.

During the reigns of Elizabeth I and James I, Martin was prosecuted for his recusancy and he also sheltered Catholic priests in his home. It was probably during the 1580s that he wrote his account of Holy Trinity Church as it was before the Reformation. According to Walter Arthur Copinger:

Roger was a staunch Roman Catholic and eminent as well for his piety as his liberality. It is recorded that at one period of bitter persecution he was obliged to hide himself during the daytime under a hay rick, but so popular and beloved was he by his neighbours and acquaintances that they did everything in their power for his security and protection. He was a person of great learning and strict integrity.

== Works ==
- David Dymond and Clive Paine, The Spoil of Melford Church: The Reformation in a Suffolk Parish (Salient Press, 1989; 2nd edn., 1992). ISBN 086055192X
