= Martin baronets =

Set index for Martin baronets

There have been four baronetcies created for persons with the surname Martin, one in the Baronetage of England, one in the Baronetage of Great Britain and two in the Baronetage of the United Kingdom. All creations are now extinct.

- Martin baronets of Long Melford (1667)
- Martin baronets of Lockynge (1791)
- Martin baronets of Cappagh (1885): see Sir Richard Martin, 1st Baronet, of Cappagh (1831–1901)
- Martin baronets of Overbury Court (1905): see Sir Richard Martin, 1st Baronet, of Overbury Court (1838–1916)
