= John de Moels, 1st Baron Moels =

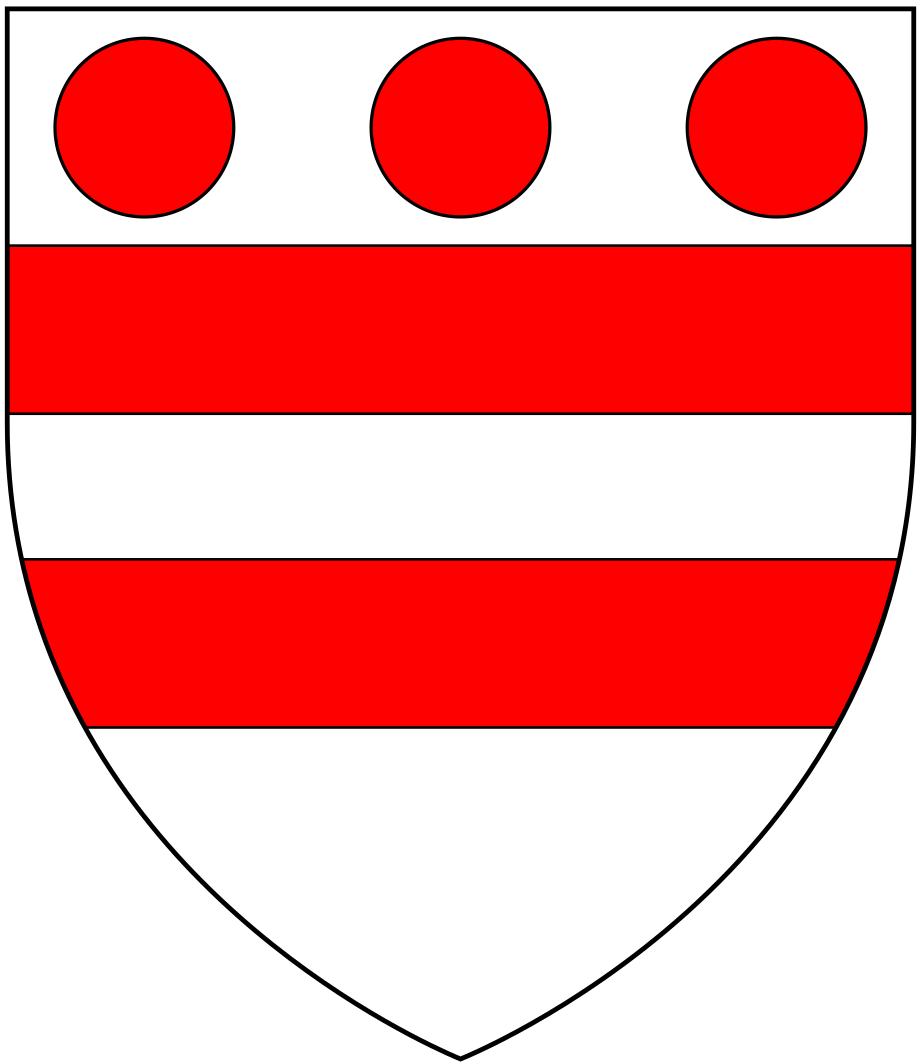
Arms of de Moels: Argent, two bars gules in chief three torteaux

John de Moels, 1st Baron Moels (1269 – 20 May 1310), feudal baron of North Cadbury in Somerset, was an English peer.

He was the second son of Roger de Moels (c.1233-1295) the eldest surviving son and heir of Nicholas de Moels (died 1269), feudal baron of a moiety of North Cadbury, Somerset.

From 1296 to 1309 he received various summonses for military service against the Scots and in Flanders. He was summoned to attend the king at Salisbury 24 February 1296/7 and to a military council at Rochester 8 September 1297. In 1297 the Sheriff of Dorset was ordered to provide housing within Sherborne Castle for John and his wife "to live in during the king's pleasure".

He was summoned to Parliament on several occasions, firstly on 6 February 1298/9, when he is deemed to have become 1st Baron Moels in the Peerage of England; his last summons was on 16 June 1311, after his death. Although he was not summoned to the Parliament at Lincoln in 1301, he was one of the signatories to the Barons' Letter of 1301 sealed at that Parliament by seven English earls and 96 English barons to Pope Boniface VIII as a repudiation of his claim of feudal overlordship of Scotland (expressed in the Bull Scimus Fili), and as a defence of the rights of King King Edward I of England as overlord of Scotland. His surviving seal displays his arms two bars three roundels in chief (tinctures not apparent) with legend: S(IGILLUM) JOH(ANN)IS DE MOLIS ("seal of John de Moels"). In the Parliament held at Westminster on 28 February 1304/5 he was one of the persons who mainperned William de Montagu, who together with Amauri de St Amand had been imprisoned in the Tower of London.

His principal landholdings were: Cadbury and Mapperton in Somerset; King's Carswell, Diptford and Langford in Devon; Little Berkhampstead in Hertfordshire; Over Orton and Stoke Basset in Oxfordshire.

He had children (Note: The Complete Peerage states, "In 1297 the sheriff of Dorset was ordered to deliver to John houses within the castle of Sherborne sufficient for himself and his wife to live in...") including:

- Nicholas de Moels, 2nd Baron Moels (10 August 1289 – before 29 January 1315/6), who married Margaret Courtenay (died 1349) daughter of Sir Hugh Courtenay (died 1292), feudal baron of Okehampton by his wife Eleanor le Despencer, and father of Hugh Courtenay, 1st/9th Earl of Devon (died 1340). The marriage was childless.
- Roger de Moels, 3rd Baron Moels, who died before 13 July 1316, without male issue.
- John de Moels, 4th Baron Moels (died before 21 August 1337), who married Joan Lovel, daughter of Richard Lovel of Castle Cary, Somerset. He died leaving two daughters, each a co-heiresses to a moiety of the feudal barony of North Cadbury, the de Moels barony by writ and other lands:
  - Muriel de Moels (died before 1362), eldest daughter, who married Thomas Courtenay (died 1356/1362), 5th son of Hugh Courtenay, 1st/9th Earl of Devon (1275–1340).
  - Isabel de Moels, younger daughter, who married William de Botreaux (died 1349), of Boscastle, Cornwall, Sheriff of Cornwall, whose son was William de Botreaux, 1st Baron Botreaux (1337–1391)
- Johanna de Moels, wife of Sir Henry VII de la Pomeray (1291–1327), feudal baron of Berry Pomeroy in Devon.

== Notes ==
Peerage of England
New creation	Baron Moels; 1299–1310	Succeeded by Nicholas Moels
