= Drax =

Drax may refer to:

== Places ==
- Drax, North Yorkshire, a village and civil parish in the United Kingdom
  - Drax Priory, a former Augustinian priory
  - Drax Power Station, the largest power station in Britain

== People ==
- Drax (surname), people with the surname

== Fictional characters ==
- Sir Hugo Drax, in the James Bond novel and film Moonraker
- Drax the Destroyer, a Marvel Comics character
  - Drax (Marvel Cinematic Universe), the film version of the character
- Infinity-Man, a DC Comics character also named "Drax"
- Drax (Time Lord), in the Doctor Who television series

== Companies ==
- Drax Group, a British electrical power generation company
