= Fulk Paynel =

12th-century Anglo-Norman nobleman

Fulk Paynel (sometimes Fulk Paganel or Fulk Painell; died c. 1182) was an Anglo-Norman nobleman and landowner.

== Background ==
Paynel was the son of William Paynel and his wife, a daughter of William fitzWimund. Fulk had three full brothers, including Hugh Paynel, and a half-sister. (Note: There may have been another full sister also.)

== Career ==
William Paynel died between 1145 and 1147, and at first, his lands were given to his sons-in-law. King Stephen of England disinherited William Paynel's sons because they supported Stephen's rival, the Empress Matilda. In 1154, however, Stephen besieged Drax Castle, took it from Robert de Gant, and restored William Paynel's lands to his sons. Stephen's change probably owed much to the influence of Matilda's son, Henry fitzEmpress, who Stephen had just named as his successor after the death of Stephen's heir. In this settlement William's lands were divided between Hugh, Fulk, and Robert de Gant. Fulk received Drax in England and Hambye in Normandy in this settlement.

Paynel was not very involved in English affairs but was active in Norman government. He attested over thirty charters of King Henry II of England when Henry was in Normandy. In 1166 Fulk took part in Henry's campaigns in Brittany. The king made Paynel one of the guarantors of an agreement between the king and the Count of Maurienne in 1173. Paynel was placed in charge of Alençon and La Roche-Mabille in 1180. Paynel never held a royal or governmental office, but his frequent attestation of charters shows that he was prominent in the royal service.

== Legacy ==
Paynel endowed Drax Priory and Holy Trinity, York in England. In Normandy he gave gifts to Hambye Abbey and Mont Saint-Michel.

Paynel married Lescelina de Suligny, daughter of Hasculf de Suligny. They had five sons, William, Fulk, Hasculf, John, and William. Paynel died around 1182 or 1183, and his heir was his eldest son William.
