= St Peter and St Paul's Church, Drax =

Church in Selby, UK

Coordinates: 53°43′46″N 0°58′37″W

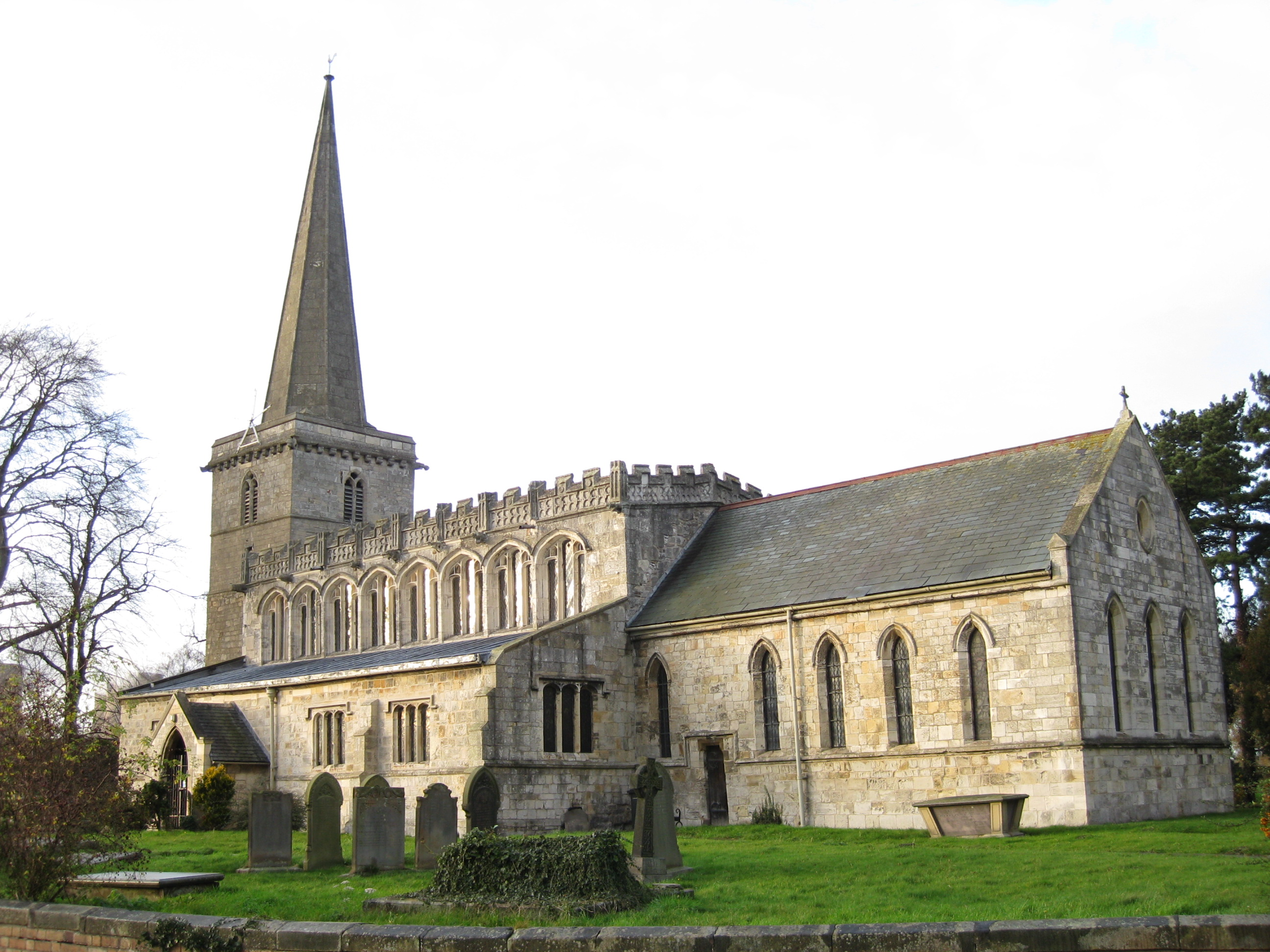
The church, in 2011

St Peter and St Paul's Church is the parish church of Drax, North Yorkshire, a village in England.

The church was founded during the reign of Henry I of England by William Paynel, who also founded Drax Priory. It was expanded in 1230, for Letticia, Baroness of Drax. In the 14th century, the north aisle was widened, with a chapel added. There were further additions in the 15th and 16th centuries, and again in the 19th century. It was restored in the 1930s, by Charles Nicholson. The church was grade I listed in 1986.

The church has a nave with a clerestory, north and south aisles, a south porch, a chancel with a north vestry, and a west steeple. The steeple has a tower with three stages, quoins, bands, lancet windows, trefoil openings, two-light bell openings, a corbel table with gargoyles on the angles, and a recessed octagonal spire. The clerestory contains Perpendicular windows, continuous hood moulds, gargoyles, and decorated embattled parapets. The porch is gabled, and contains an opening with a pointed arch, and seven re-set corbel heads, a moulded hood on foliate capitals and chamfered jambs. The reset figures are said to have come from Drax Priory. Inside the church is a 12th-century tub font, a piscina, carved bench ends from the 1540s, a late 17th-century altar rail, and several 18th-century memorials.

== See also ==
- Grade I listed buildings in North Yorkshire (district)
- Listed buildings in Drax, North Yorkshire
