= John Dinham =

John Dinham or Dynham may refer to:

- John Dinham (1359–1428), knight from Devonshire, England
- John Dinham (1406–1458), knight from Devonshire, England
- John Dynham, 1st Baron Dynham (c. 1433–1501)
