= Thomas Courtenay (of Wootton Courtenay) =

English knight

- Paternal arms of Sir Thomas Courtenay of Wootton Courtenay: Or, three torteaux a label of three points azure
- Born: 1315
- Died: 9 June 1362 (aged 46–47)
- Spouse: Muriel de Moels
- Children: 3
- Father: Hugh de Courtenay
- Relatives: John Saint John (grandfather); John St John (uncle); John Dinham (grandson)

Sir Thomas Courtenay (1315 – 9 June 1362) of Wootton Courtenay in Somerset, was a knight and an English military commander against the French during the Hundred Years' War, who died about six years after the Battle of Poitiers.

== Origins ==
He was the fourth son of Hugh de Courtenay, 1st/9th Earl of Devon (1276–1340), of Tiverton Castle in Devon, by his wife Agnes de Saint John (d.1340), a daughter of John Saint John (d. 1302) of Basing in Hampshire and a sister of John St John, 1st Baron St John (d. 1329) of Basing.

== Marriage and children ==
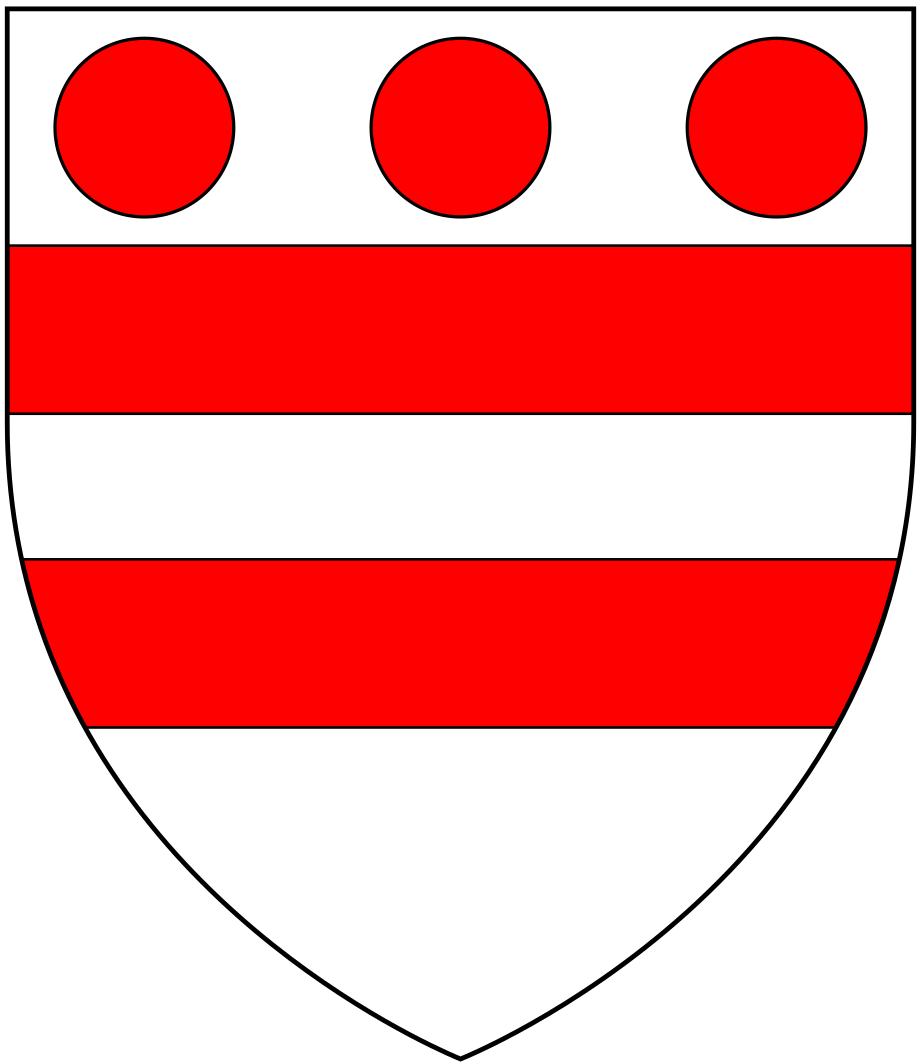
Arms of de Moels: Argent, two bars gules in chief three torteaux

At some time before 27 August 1337 he married a great heiress, Muriel de Moels (1322–1369), the elder of the two daughters and co-heiresses of John de Moels, 4th Baron Moels, feudal baron of North Cadbury in Somerset, by his wife Joan Lovel, a daughter of Richard Lovel, Knt., Lord Lovel of Castle Cary in Somerset. Having married this daughter and heiress of a tenant-in-chief without royal licence, he received a royal pardon on 27 August 1337. By his wife he had one son and two daughters:

- Hugh Courtenay (d.1369) who died a minor childless, leaving his two sisters as co-heiresses;
- Muriel Courtenay, a co-heiress of her brother, married Sir John Dynham (1318–1383), of Hartland and of Nutwell in Devon, feudal baron of Cardinham in Cornwall. Her son was Sir John Dinham (1359–1428). Muriel brought King's Carswell into the Dynham family, which became one of their seats.
- Margaret Courtenay, a co-heiress of her brother, who married Sir Thomas Peverell, from a cadet branch of Peverell of Sampford Peverell in Devon, whose only daughter and sole heiress was Eleanor Peverell, wife of Walter Hungerford, 1st Baron Hungerford.

== Death ==
Courtenay died on 9 June 1362, having 16 years earlier in 1346 petitioned the Pope for an indult for plenary remission at the hour of death.

== Landholdings ==
His wife's share of her paternal inheritance included the manors of King's Carswell and Dunterton in Devon, and Blackford, Holton and Lattiford in Somerset.

His landholdings increased greatly after inheritances from his marriage of many lands of the feudal barony of North Cadbury. His landholdings included, in Devon: Woodhuish, in the parish of Brixham; Kings Carswell; Dunterton; Plymtree, which he purchased and was recorded as lord of the manor in 1345; and Sutton Lucy and Lucyhays, in Colyton hundred.

In Somerset he held Wootton Courtenay, Blackford, Holton, Lattiford, Maperton (to which church he presented in 1343 and 1351), South Cadbury (to which church he presented in 1351), and Cricket Malherbie (to which church he presented in 1340 and 1349).

He also held Over Wallop, Hampshire and Over Worton, Oxfordshire.

== Sources ==
- Pole, Sir William (d.1635), Collections Towards a Description of the County of Devon, Sir John-William de la Pole (ed.), London, 1791
- Richardson, Douglas, Magna Carta Ancestry: A Study in Colonial and Medieval Families, 2nd edition
