= John Dinham (1359–1428) =

English knight (1359–1428)

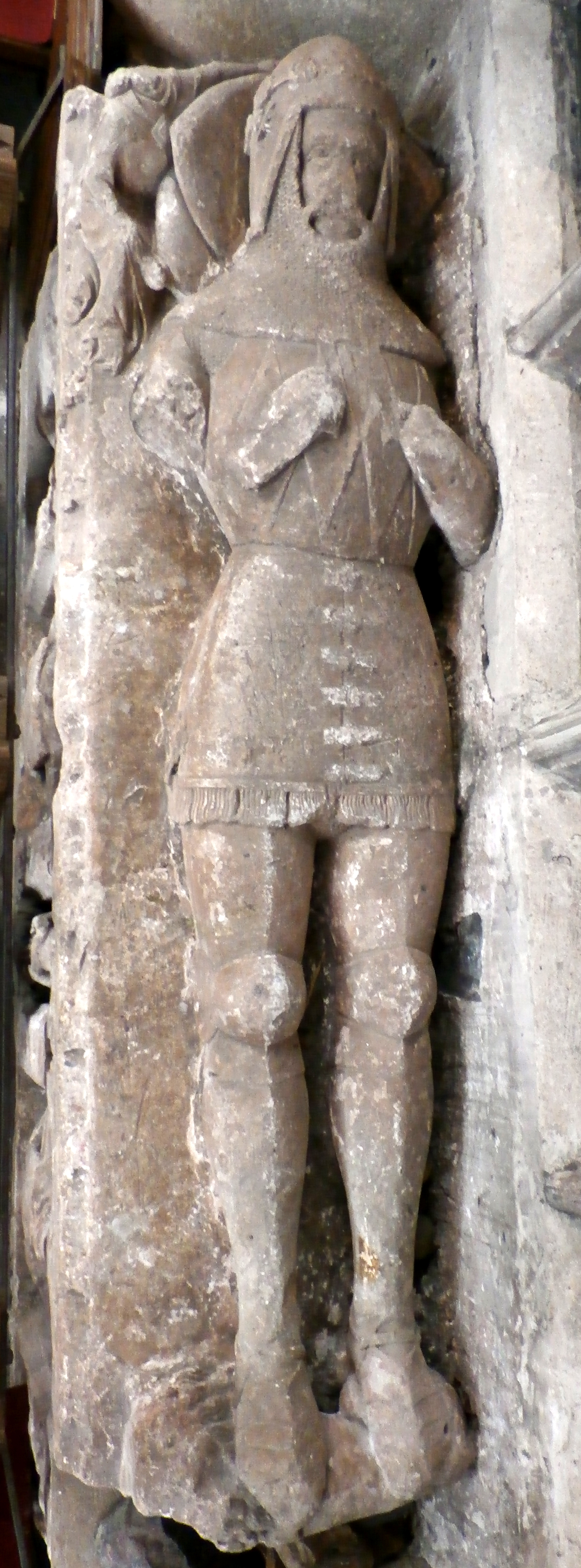
- Effigy of Sir John Dinham (1359–1428), St Mary's Church, Kingskerswell. The arms of Dinham are visible sculpted in low-relief on the chest of his surcoat: four fusils in fess
- Born: 1359
- Died: 25 December 1428 (aged 68–69)
- Spouse(s): Eleanor de Montagu; Maud Mautravers (d. ~1402); Philippa Lovel
- Children: 2, including John
- Relatives: Thomas Courtenay (grandfather)

Arms of Dinham: Gules, four fusils in fess ermine

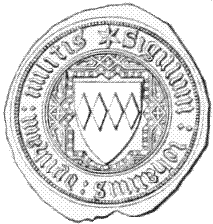
Seal of Sir John Dinham (1359–1428) appendant to an indenture dated 9 Richard II (1385), showing the arms of Dynham: four fusils in fess with inscription: Sigillum Johannis Dynham militis ("seal of John Dynham, knight")

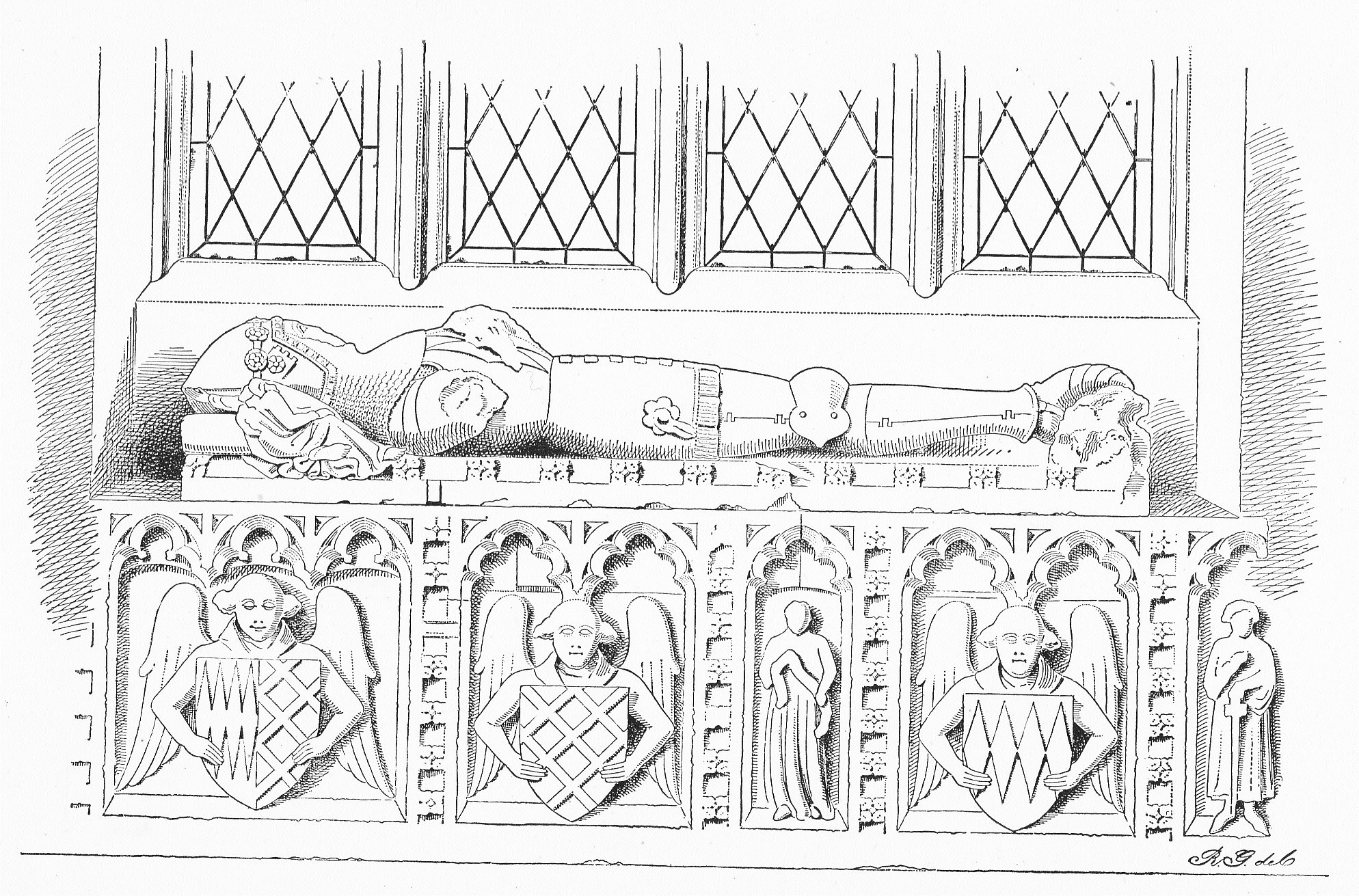
Effigy of Sir John Dinham (1359–1428), St Mary's Church, Kingskerswell, north aisle Two female effigies also survive separately, believed to represent two of his three wives. Rogers (1890) suggests one of the ladies to be his second wife Maud Maltravers from the heraldic evidence on Dinham's chest tomb, the arms of her father Sir John Maltravers of Hook, Dorset, being Sable, a fret or. Under the effigy the Dinham arms impale the arms fretty.

Sir John Dinham (1359–1428) was a knight from Devonshire, England. His principal seats were at Hartland in North Devon, Kingskerswell and Nutwell in South Devon, and Buckland Dinham in Somerset and Cardinham in Cornwall. He killed one of the murderers of his father in Exeter Cathedral, for which he was pardoned by the king. He later broke into Hartland Abbey and assaulted the abbot over a long-standing disagreement, and also performed other acts of violence. He married three times; his heir was John Dinham (1406–1458). His effigy survives in the Kingskerswell parish church.

== Origins and inheritance ==
The Dynham family took its name from its ancient manor of Dinan in Brittany. They had been at Nutwell since about 1122 and were one of the leading gentry families in Devon. They founded Hartland Abbey in 1169 on their manor at Hartland.

John Dinham was the son and heir of Sir John Dinham (1318–1383) by his wife Muriel Courtenay, the elder daughter and co-heiress of Sir Thomas Courtenay (1312–1362) of Wootton Courtenay in Somerset. Thomas Courtenay was the fourth son of Hugh de Courtenay, 9th Earl of Devon (1276–1340)) by his wife Agnes de Saint John. Muriel's mother was Thomas de Courtenay's wife Muriel de Moels (died before 1369), the elder daughter and co-heiress of Sir John de Moels (died 1337), feudal baron of North Cadbury in Somerset.

Dinham's father was murdered by robbers on 7 January 1383, when John was aged 24. He inherited his father's estates including Hartland and Nutwell in Devon, Buckland Dinham in Somerset and Cardinham in Cornwall. He also inherited from his mother 3½ knight's fees, including the former de Moels estate of Kingskerswell in Devon, which he made his seat, and also Woodhuish, Dunterton in Devon and Cricket Malherbie and Northome in Somerset and Over Worton with a moiety of North Stoke, Oxfordshire and Over Wallop in Hampshire, together with four advowsons.

On his mother's death and following her burial in Hartland Abbey, Bishop of Exeter Thomas Brantingham granted an indulgence for 40 days to any of his parishioners who should say for the soul of Lady Muriell Dynham and for the souls of all the faithful departed, with pious mind a prayer Oracio Dominica with a Salutacio Angelica.

== Biography ==
Dinham was a violent man. The two thieves, Robert Tuwyng and John Broun, who had murdered his father were convicted of robbery and murder and incarcerated in Ilchester prison. After apparently having escaped, John Broun was tracked down by Dinham and fled for sanctuary into Exeter Cathedral. On 18 February 1383 Dinham broke down the door and killed him after a fierce struggle, thus avenging his father's murder. On 16 March 1383 he received the king's pardon for his action, (Note: The Register of Bishop Brantyngham also contains the following commission ordered by the Bishop: "To the Prior of Plympton and Masters Roger Payn, President of the Consistory Court, and John Lugans, R. of Petrockstowe.—It had been reported to the Bishop that Sir John Dynham, Knt., had forcibly abstracted and carried off from the Cathedral Church, on Wednesday in the second week of the holy Season of Lent, a man who had fled thither for sanctuary, having demolished the door of the place where he had taken refuge. There was a fierce struggle and blood was shed. The offenders were liable to Excommunication; and the Bishop commanded the above-named Commissaries to investigate the case, taking the evidence of all who were cognisant of the facts and were not suspected of complicity (an incomplete Entry, without date).") but was ordered by the Bishop Thomas de Brantingham to perform penance for having violated the right of sanctuary. The penance mandated by the bishop on 21 March 1383 was:

"that on a Sunday before this Pentecost he should stand at the small altar between the choir and the high altar on the south side, with head uncovered with a lit candle of 2 lbs weight in his hand from the start of the high mass, that is to say the Confession (Confiteor) until the end of the same mass and then if he should so wish to make gift at the offertory of the same candle into the hand of the celebrant at the high mass".

There had been a long history of quarrelling between the abbots of Hartland Abbey and the Dinham family, founders of the abbey, mainly concerning patronage and occupation of the abbey during a vacancy. In 1397 Abbot Philip Tone claimed as abbot the lordship of the manor of Stoke St Nectan, near the parish church of St Nectan, Hartland, and claimed thereby view of frankpledge from the residents of that manor. In August that year Dinham was accused by the Abbot of Hartland of "breaking into his houses, assaulting him and chasing him to his chamber and ill-treating his servants". Dinham with his armed supporters appeared at the abbey, "and so ill-used him that his life was despaired of, took timber and goods to the value of £20, killed 22 sheep, carried off 2 cows, depastured corn and grass, imprisoned his servant, assaulted and ill-used his men, servants and bondsmen".

This action prevented the abbot from cultivating his land for a long period and frightened away his tenants and the lucrative flow of visitors come either to pray at the holy sites or to buy tithes. On 27 February 1398 Dinham was bound over to keep the peace for 1,000 marks, levied on his lands and chattels in England, with Sir John de la Pomeray, Sir John Prideaux, Giles Aysse and John Stantorre each standing as surety for £200.

Dinham was later found guilty of committing assaults on others in January 1402 and in December 1404. In September 1402 he was amongst those accused by the Abbot of Torre Abbey of digging up a road at Kingkerswell and assaulting the abbot's men. He also committed acts of violence at Nutwell and at Littleham.

On 28 April 1407, having paid 700 of his 1,000 marks' surety he and his mainpernors were pardoned.

== Family ==
Dinham married three times. His first marriage, some time before 3 February 1380, was to a lady named Eleanor or Ellen (died after 22 Sept 1387). Her parentage has not been directly evidenced, but she has been shown to have been Eleanor de Montagu, daughter of John de Montacute, 1st Baron Montacute and his wife Margaret de Monthermer. Eleanor was granted licence by Bishop Brantingham in 1382 to hold divine service during one year in her chapel situated within her manor of Kytone, and John and "Elianora" were also granted by the bishop on 3 January 1384, licence to celebrate divine mass in their chapel within their manor of Kingskerswell.

By Eleanor, Dinham had a daughter Muriel, who married Sir Edward Hastings of Elsing and Gressenhall.

Dinham's second marriage, before 26 November 1396, was to Maud Mautravers (died c. 1402), a daughter and co-heiress of Sir John Mautravers of Hooke, Dorset (a cousin of John Maltravers, 1st Baron Maltravers (1290?–1365) of Lytchett Matravers, Dorset) and widow of Piers/Peter de la Mare (b.1368) of Offley, Hertfordshire and of the Market Lavington, Wiltshire family. Peter predeceased his mother Maud/Matilda de Hastings, wife of Robert de la Mare (1314–1382), so his sister Willelma de la Mare, married to Sir John Roches of Bromham, Wiltshire, became the sole heiress to the Market Lavington estates.

His third wife was Philippa Lovel (died 15 May 1465), daughter of Sir John Lovel of Titchmarsh, Northamptonshire and Minster Lovell, Oxfordshire, by his wife Alianore la Zouche, daughter of Sir William la Zouche of Harringworth, Northamptonshire. Philippa survived her husband and some time before 24 March 1429 remarried, to Nicholas Broughton. By Philippa Lovel, Dynham had a son and heir, Sir John Dinham (1406–1458).

Dinham died on 25 December 1428 at the age of about 69.

== Monuments ==
Dinham's chest tomb with his effigy and the effigies of two of his wives survive in St Mary's Church, Kingskerswell, adjacent to the ruins of the Dinham manor house and seat. All the monuments been moved from their original unknown positions to each occupy a separate window ledge in the north aisle. The effigy of Dinham himself retains one front of its chest-tomb base, decorated with angels holding heraldic escutcheons. The arms of Dinham, four fusils in fess, are still visible sculpted in low-relief on the chest of his surcoat.

== Sources ==
- Chope, R. Pearse, The Book of Hartland, Torquay, 1940
- Cokayne, George Edward; Gibbs, Vicary; Doubleday, H. Arthur, eds. (1916). Complete peerage of England, Scotland, Ireland, Great Britain and the United Kingdom, extant, extinct or dormant (Dacre to Dysart). Vol. 4 (2nd ed.). London: The St. Catherine Press, Ltd.
- Hingeston-Randolph, F. C. (1901). The Register of Thomas de Brantyngham: Bishop of Exeter (A.D. 1370–1394). London: George Bell & Sons.
