= Long Drax =

Hamlet and civil parish in North Yorkshire, England

Coordinates: 53.746780°N 0.966596°W

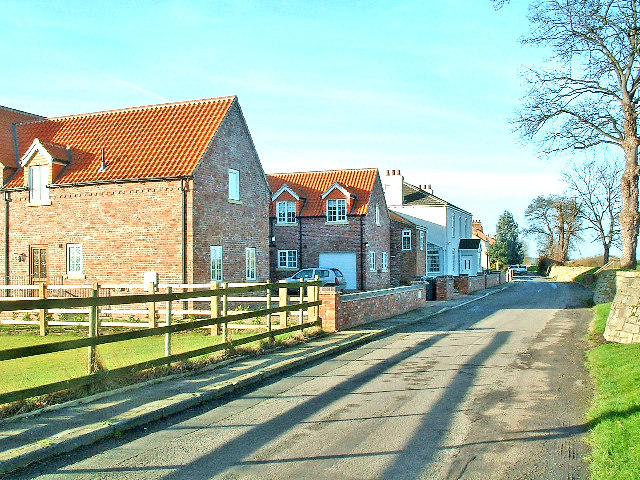
- Long Drax, Main Street

- Location within North Yorkshire
- Population: 125 (Census 2011)
- OS grid reference: SE6828
- Civil parish: Long Drax
- Unitary authority: North Yorkshire
- Ceremonial county: North Yorkshire
- Region: Yorkshire and the Humber
- Country: England
- Sovereign state: United Kingdom
- Post town: SELBY
- Postcode district: YO8
- Dialling code: 01757
- Police: North Yorkshire
- Fire: North Yorkshire
- Ambulance: Yorkshire
- UK Parliament: Selby

Long Drax (also known as Langrick) is a small hamlet and civil parish in the county of North Yorkshire, England, about 2 miles north-east of Drax. In 2011 it had a population of 125.

The settlement consists of a linear string of houses along the bank of the River Ouse, as well as several scattered farms.

To the west of Long Drax is the site of Drax Priory. Founded in the 1130s, the Priory was dedicated to St. Nicholas and is believed to have been moated. It was subsequently destroyed during the Dissolution of the Monasteries in 1535. A farmhouse was built on the site in the 18th century and later became a meeting place for Quakers. The site is now known as Drax Abbey farm and has been a scheduled monument since 1964.

The village was historically part of the West Riding of Yorkshire until 1974. From 1974 to 2023 it was part of the Selby District, it is now administered by the unitary North Yorkshire Council.

Drax Power Station occupies a large area in the south-west of the parish.

== See also ==
- Long Drax swing bridge
