= Listed buildings in Drax, North Yorkshire =

Drax is a civil parish in the county of North Yorkshire, England. It contains two listed buildings that are recorded in the National Heritage List for England. Of these, one is listed at Grade I, the highest of the three grades, and the other is at Grade II, the lowest grade. The parish contains the village of Drax and the surrounding area, and the listed buildings consist of a church and the remains of a cross in the churchyard.

== Key ==
Grade	Criteria
I	Buildings of exceptional interest, sometimes considered to be internationally important
II	Buildings of national importance and special interest

== Buildings ==
Name and location	Photograph	Date	Notes	Grade
St Peter and St Paul's Church; 53.72942°N 0.97693°W		12th century	The church has been altered and enlarged through the centuries. It is built in magnesian limestone and has roofs of lead and slate. The church consists of a nave with a clerestory, north and south aisles, a south porch, a chancel with a north vestry, and a west steeple. The steeple has a tower with three stages, quoins, bands, lancet windows, trefoil openings, two-light bell openings, a corbel table with gargoyles on the angles, and a recessed octagonal spire. The clerestory contains Perpendicular windows, continuous hood moulds, gargoyles, and decorated embattled parapets. The porch is gabled, and contains an opening with a pointed arch, and seven re-set corbel heads, and a moulded hood on foliate capitals and chamfered jambs.	I
Cross base and shaft 53.72929°N 0.97716°W	—	Medieval	The remaining parts of the cross are in magnesian limestone, and are in the churchyard of St Peter and St Paul's Church to the south of the porch. They consist of a square plinth tapering to an octagonal base, with a deep rectangular mortice for the shaft. The remains of the chamfered shaft lie to the side.	II
