= Baron Moels =

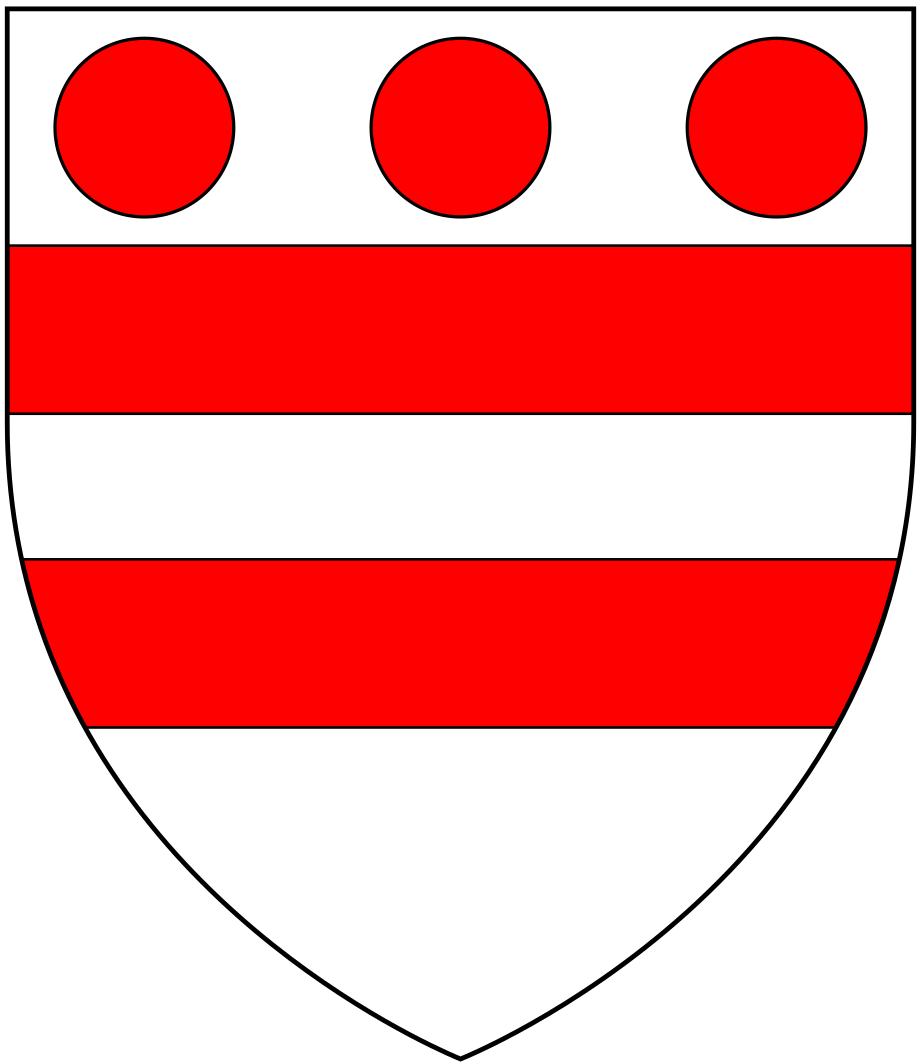
Arms of de Moels: Argent, two bars gules in chief three torteaux

The title Baron Moels was created once in the Peerage of England, in 1299, and passed into abeyance with the death of the fourth lord in 1337. The four men who by modern usage are held to have been Barons Moels were:

- John Moels, 1st Baron Moels (1269–1310) was on 6 February 1299 summoned to Parliament, thereby becoming first Baron Moels. He was the second son of Roger de Moels (c.1233-1295) the eldest surviving son and heir of Nicholas de Moels (d. 1269), feudal baron of a moiety of North Cadbury, Somerset. Following John's death, any inherited title created by his Parliamentary summons would have been held in succession by his three sons:
- Nicholas Moels, 2nd Baron Moels (1289–1315/6), summoned to Parliament from 1311, he married Margaret Courtenay (d.1349) daughter of Sir Hugh Courtenay (d.1292), feudal baron of Okehampton and father of Hugh Courtenay, 1st Earl of Devon (d.1340). The marriage was without issue, and his heir was his next brother.
- Roger Moels, 3rd Baron Moels, (1295–1316), heir to his brother but dead without issue within months, he was never summoned to Parliament but by modern usage held to have briefly been Baron Moels.
- John Moels, 4th Baron Moels, K.B. (1294–1337), likewise never summoned to Parliament but his brothers' successor as Baron Moels by modern usage, he married Joan Lovel, daughter of Richard Lovel of Castle Cary, Somerset. He died leaving two daughters, co-heiresses to a moiety of the feudal barony of North Cadbury, the de Moels barony by writ and other lands, and between whom the barony is held to have fallen into abeyance:
  - Muriel (d.pre 1362) the eldest married Thomas Courtenay (d.1356/1362), 5th son of Hugh Courtenay, 1st Earl of Devon (1275–1340).
  - Isabel the younger daughter married William de Botreaux (d.1349), of Boscastle, Cornwall, Sheriff of Cornwall, whose issue was William de Botreaux, 1st Baron Botreaux (1337–1391)
