= Baldwin FitzGilbert =

11th-century Norman nobleman in England

- Born: c. 1030
- Died: 1086–1091
- Children: 6
- Relatives: Richard FitzGilbert (brother)

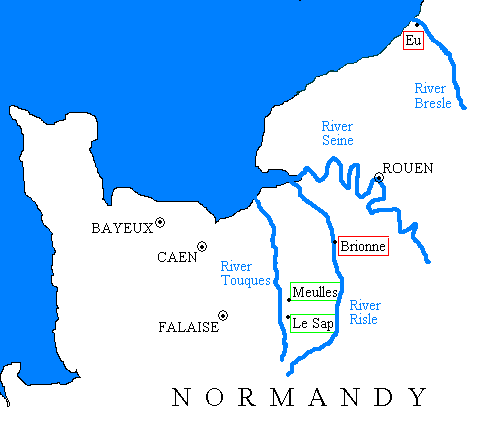
Map showing manors in Normandy associated with the origins of Baldwin FitzGilbert

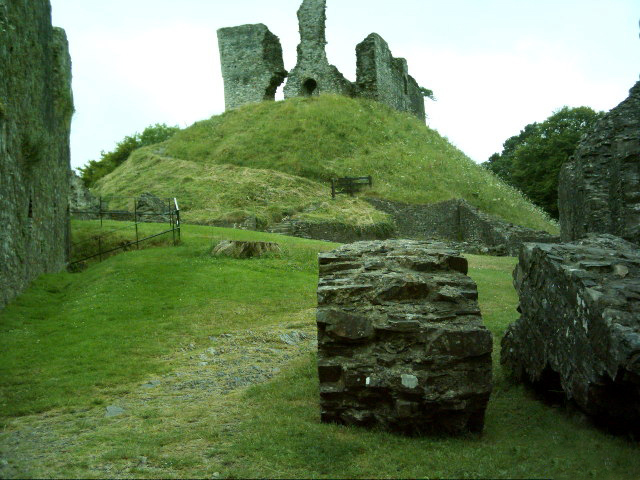
Surviving motte and ruins of keep of Okehampton Castle, built by Baldwin FitzGilbert and caput of his feudal barony of Okehampton

Baldwin FitzGilbert (c. 1030 – 1086/1091) (alias Baldwin the Sheriff, Baldwin of Exeter, Baldwin de Meulles/Moels and Baldwin du Sap) was a Norman magnate and one of the 52 Devon Domesday Book tenants-in-chief of King William the Conqueror, of whom he held the largest fiefdom in Devon, comprising 176 holdings or manors. He was feudal baron of Okehampton, seated at Okehampton Castle in Devon.

== Origins ==
Baldwin was originally from Meulles or nearby Le Sap, in Calvados, Normandy. He was a younger son of Gilbert, Count of Brionne and of Eu, in Normandy.

== Career ==
Together with his eldest brother Richard FitzGilbert, in 1066 Baldwin participated in the Norman Conquest of England.

Following the successful siege of the Saxon city of Exeter, William the Conqueror appointed Baldwin castellan of the newly built royal castle there, Rougemont Castle. He also appointed him hereditary Sheriff of Devon, a position he held until his death. Exeter Castle was thenceforth the official seat of the Sheriff of Devon. King William I also granted him the very large feudal barony of Okehampton in Devon, at the caput of which he built Okehampton Castle.

== English landholdings ==
Baldwin's fiefdom in Devon was the largest in that county, listed in the Domesday Book of 1086 as comprising 176 holdings, mostly manors or estates, except the first two listed holdings which consisted of groups of houses in Exeter and Barnstaple. He is listed in the Domesday Book as "Baldvinus Vicecomes", literally translated as "Baldwin the Viscount", a Norman title signifying that he had an administrative responsibility over the county of Devon, which office had become almost synonymous with the Sheriff of Devon, an Anglo-Saxon office. For this reason Baldwin is commonly known as "Baldwin the Sheriff". These landholdings comprised the feudal barony of Okehampton, later held by the Courtenay family, later also feudal barons of Plympton and Earls of Devon.

== Marriage and children ==
Baldwin's first wife was named Albreda, whom Orderic Vitalis refers to as a daughter of the aunt of William the Conqueror, presumably niece of his mother Herleva. In the Domesday Book, his wife appears as Emma. He had three sons who all died childless, and two daughters:

- Robert FitzBaldwin, Baldwin's heir in Normandy
- William FitzBaldwin, inherited Baldwin's English lands
- Richard FitzBaldwin
- Adeliza FitzBaldwin, heiress to her three brothers, died childless
- (? Matilda) FitzBaldwin, wife, successively, of William fitzWimund and Ranulf Avenel. William fitzWimund is listed in the Domesday Book of 1086 as holding land at Dolton, Devon in North Tawton Hundred, from his father-in-law Baldwin.

Baldwin also had an illegitimate child, Wiger, a monk at Bec.

== Death and succession ==
Baldwin was living in 1086. He had died by 1091 according to Orderic. Following the deaths of his three sons without heirs, his daughter Adeliza was his ultimate sole heiress.
