= Hugh de Courtenay (died 1292) =

English noble (1251–1292)

Sir Hugh de Courtenay
- Born: 25 March 1251
- Died: 28 February 1292 (aged 40); Colcombe, Devon
- Noble family: Courtenay
- Spouse: Eleanor le Despenser
- Issue: Hugh de Courtenay, 9th Earl of Devon; John Courtenay; Philip Courtenay; Isabel Courtenay; Aveline Courtenay; Egeline Courtenay; Margaret Courtenay
- Father: John de Courtenay
- Mother: Isabel de Vere

Sir Hugh de Courtenay (1251–1292) was the son and heir of John de Courtenay, feudal baron of Okehampton, Devon, by Isabel de Vere, daughter of Hugh de Vere, 4th Earl of Oxford. His son inherited the earldom of Devon.

== Early years ==
Sir Hugh de Courtenay, born 25 March 1251, was the son and heir of John de Courtenay of Okehampton, Devon, by Isabel de Vere, daughter of Hugh de Vere, 4th Earl of Oxford, and Hawise de Quincy. John's father, Robert de Courtenay (d. 26 July 1242), son of Renaud II de Courtenay (d. 1190) by Hawise de Curcy (d. 1219), heiress of the feudal barony of Okehampton, married Mary de Redvers (sometimes called 'de Vernon'), daughter of William de Redvers, 5th Earl of Devon (d. 1217). Renaud II was son of Renaud de Courtenay.

In order to avoid military service Courtenay paid a fine on 12 December 1276. He was called to arms on the emergency against the Welsh princes, fighting in the 1282 campaign. He attended upon the King at Shrewsbury on 28 June 1283. In 1284, he came into possession of The Abbey, Sutton Courtenay, which he first leased to Solomon of Rochester. He again absented himself from the wars on 14 June 1287 by paying the King's justice a fine.

== Marriage and issue ==
Courtenay married Eleanor le Despenser (d.1328), daughter of Hugh le Despencer, 1st Baron le Despencer, Justiciar of England, of Loughborough, Leicestershire and Ryhall, Rutland by his wife Aline Basset, daughter of Sir Philip Basset, Justiciar of England, of Wycombe, Buckinghamshire and Compton Bassett and Wootton Bassett, Wiltshire. By his wife he had four sons and five daughters:

- Hugh de Courtenay, 1st/9th Earl of Devon (1276–1340) of Tiverton Castle, eldest son and heir.
- Sir Philip Courtenay (d.1314) of Moreton Hampstead in Devon, slain at Bannockburn on 24 June 1314, according to Vivian. Died childless, when Moreton Hampstead was inherited by his elder brother the Earl of Devon.
- John Courtenay, died young.
- Robert Courtenay, died young.
- Isabel de Courtenay, wife of John de Saint John, 1st Baron St John (died 1329) of Basing.
- Aveline de Courtenay, wife of Sir John Giffard
- Egeline (or Eleanor) de Courtenay, wife of Robert le Scales.
- Margaret (or Margery) de Courtenay, wife of John de Moels. Other sources give her husband as Nicholas de Moels, 2nd Baron Moels (d.1316), feudal baron of North Cadbury, Somerset. Without progeny.
- Alice Courtenay, died young

== Death ==
Courtenay died at Colcombe, Devon, on 28 February 1292. He was buried at Cowick Priory, near Exeter.
