= Drax, North Yorkshire =

Village and civil parish in North Yorkshire, England

Coordinates: 53°43′45″N 0°58′39″W

Drax
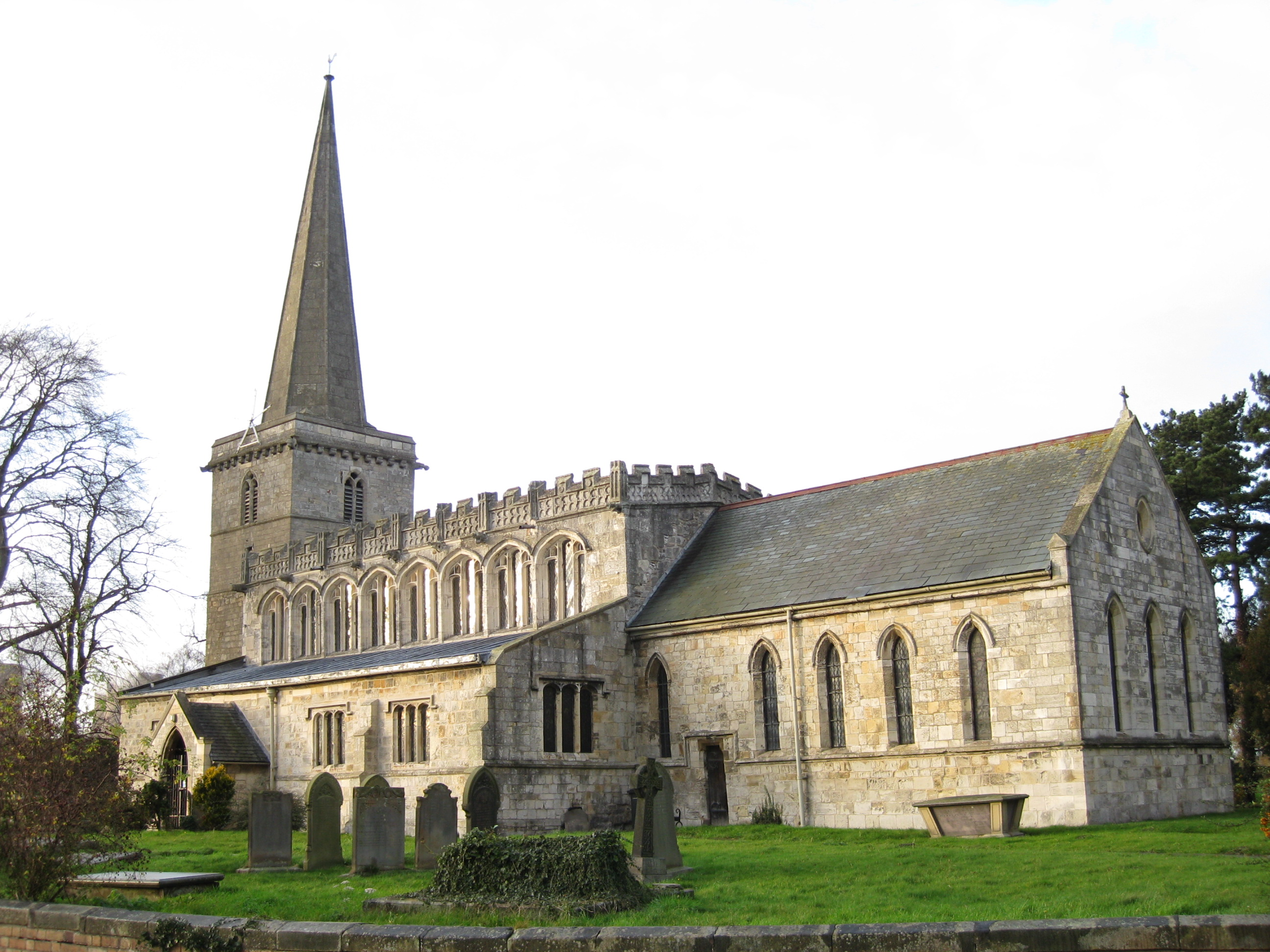
- The Church of St Peter and St Paul

- Location within North Yorkshire
- Population: 488 (2011 Census)
- OS grid reference: SE667284
- Civil parish: Drax
- Unitary authority: North Yorkshire
- Ceremonial county: North Yorkshire
- Region: Yorkshire and the Humber
- Country: England
- Sovereign state: United Kingdom
- Post town: SELBY
- Postcode district: YO8
- Dialling code: 01757
- Police: North Yorkshire
- Fire: North Yorkshire
- Ambulance: Yorkshire
- UK Parliament: Selby

Drax is a village and civil parish in North Yorkshire, England, about 6 miles (10 km) south-east of Selby, which is best known today as the site of Drax power station.

It was part of the West Riding of Yorkshire until 1 April 1974. From 1974 to 2023 it was part of the Selby District, it is now administered by the unitary North Yorkshire Council.

The Read School, an independent boarding school in the village, has existed since 1667.

== History ==
St Peter and St Paul's Church, Drax, is the parish church. In the reign of King Henry I (1100–1135) William Paynel founded a priory of Augustinian Canons at Drax. In 1868 it was reported that traces of the priory could still be found but fieldwork in the 1980s and 1990s has failed to find any physical remains of it.

By the mid-13th century, Drax was a borough of local significance. However, an inquisition held in 1405 stated that the local manor was of no value, as it had been flooded by the Ouse, and the borough was not even mentioned, leading George Sheeran to claim that flooding may have led to the abandonment of the town, or at least the end of its borough status.

However, the inquisition post mortem for Richard Lely of Drax, held in 1422, indicates that his part of the land was not completely worthless, although the mill was ruined. His son John inherited and the property then passed to John's daughter Joan, who had been born and baptised at Drax in 1424. She was married to John Babthorpe in 1441 when witnesses to her age gave depositions at York Castle, and she recovered her property out of wardship. It may be that those who held the land while she was a minor neglected it, so that there was little for her husband to pass on to their heirs. The survival of the priory until the Reformation might suggest that the area continued to be farmed. The main crops were wheat and grain.

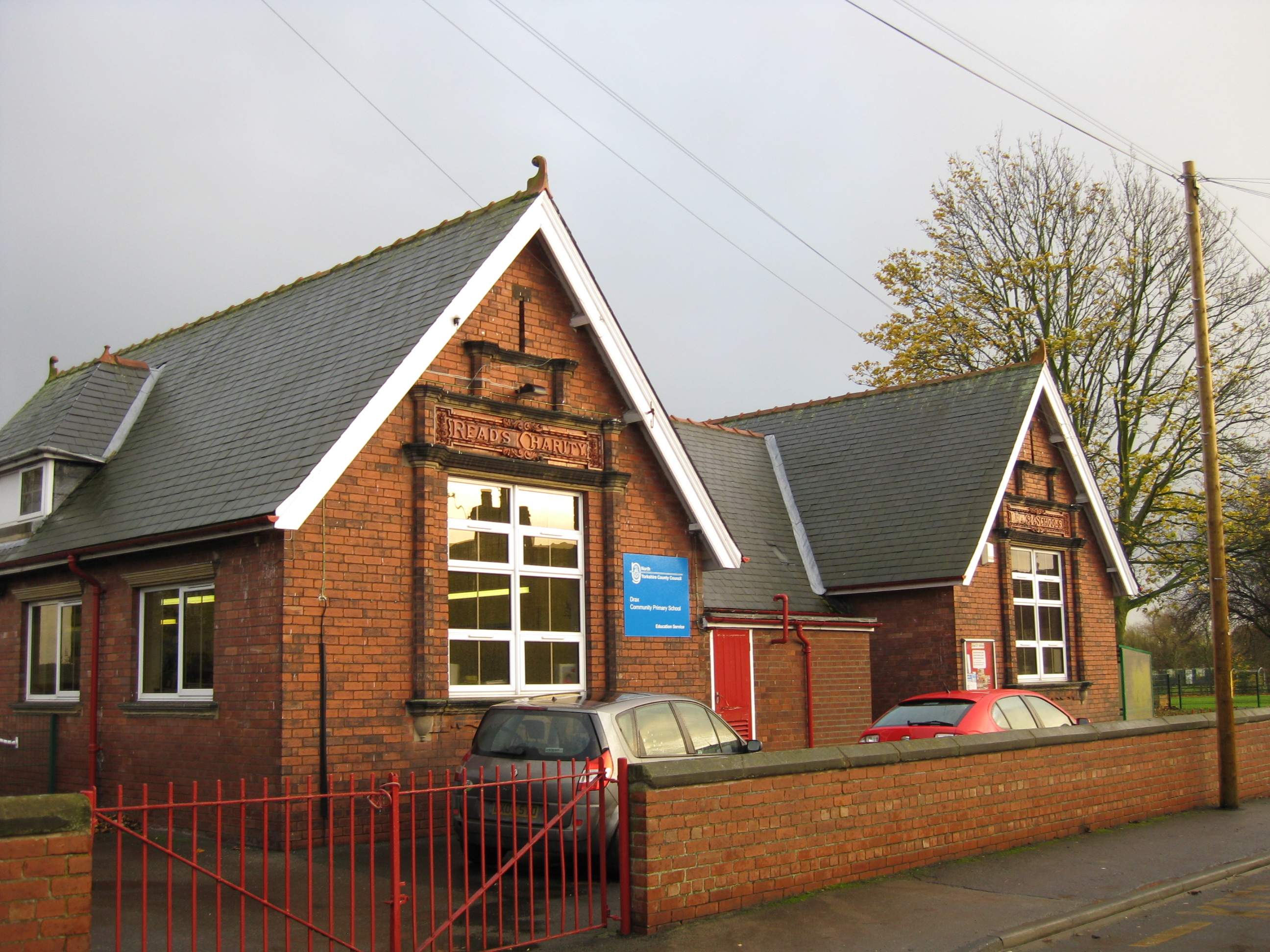
Drax primary school

In 1667 Charles Read (1604–1669) founded Drax Grammar (now called The Read School) as a grammar school: it is now an independent boarding school. Read was born at Darlton, Nottinghamshire and became a wealthy shipper in Kingston upon Hull. Two years later, Read's will endowed the school at Drax and founded further grammar schools at Tuxford in Nottinghamshire and Corby Glen in Lincolnshire. Read also funded the building of six almshouses in Drax for elderly people, stipulating that they should be for three men and three women.

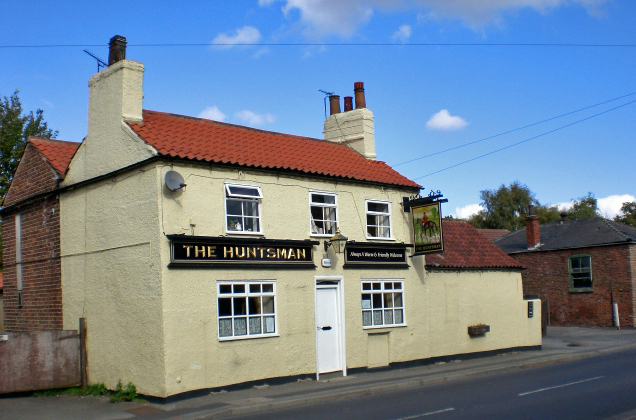
The Huntsman public house

The village primary school closed in 2017.

== Transportation ==
Drax had two railway stations: both are now closed. Drax Hales railway station was on the North Eastern Railway's (NER) Selby to Goole Line: British Railways closed it in 1964. Drax Abbey was on the Hull and Barnsley Railway (H&BR): the London and North Eastern Railway closed it in 1932. In 1970 British Rail reopened about 3 mi (5 km) of the H&BR from Gowdall Junction and a short length of the NER through Drax as a freight-only branch line to supply coal to Drax power station.

== Drax Power Station ==
The former Central Electricity Generating Board commissioned Drax power station, located in the neighbouring civil parish of Long Drax, in two phases in 1974 and 1986. It was the largest power station in the United Kingdom, producing around 8% of Britain's electricity, and was the second-largest coal-fired plant in Europe. Drax Power Station now produces its output by burning biomass.

== See also ==
- Listed buildings in Drax, North Yorkshire
