= William Paynel =

12th-century Anglo-Norman baron

- Died: around 1145 to 1147
- Occupation: Baron of Hooton Pagnell
- Spouse(s): (1) daughter of William fitzWimund (2) Avice
- Children: Hugh; Fulk; Thomas; John; Alice; possibly Gertrude
- Parent: Ralph Paynel

William Paynel (sometimes William Paganel; died around 1146) was an Anglo-Norman nobleman and baron. Son of a Domesday landholder, William inherited his father's lands in Yorkshire, Lincolnshire, and Normandy after the death of an older brother during their father's lifetime. After the death of King Henry I of England, Paynel supported Henry's daughter Matilda in her attempts to take the throne from her cousin Stephen, who had seized it. Matilda entrusted Nottingham Castle to Paynel's custody, although he lost it within two years when it was captured by a supporter of Stephen's. Paynel also founded two religious houses – one in England and one in Normandy. After Paynel's death around 1146, his lands were split between two sons.

== Early life ==
Paynel was the son of Ralph Paynel, who was a tenant-in-chief listed in Domesday Book with lands in Yorkshire. Ralph also held Middle Rasen in Lincolnshire as well as lands in Normandy – Les Moutiers-Hubert in the Calvados region and Hambye in the Manche region. Besides William, Ralph was the father of Jordan and Alexander. Jordan died before their father and without heirs. Ralph died by 1124, at which time William Paynel, the eldest surviving son, inherited his father's lands including those at Drax in Yorkshire. Other lands held by Ralph and William were Hooton Pagnell also in Yorkshire. The lands at Drax, combined with those at Hooton Pagnell, are considered a barony under the name of Hooton Pagnell, and passed to William from his father.

Sometime around 1126 to 1135, William Paynel confirmed his father's benefactions to Selby Abbey. He also appears in the 1130 Pipe Roll as owing 40 marks to the king that had been imposed by royal justices previously, although the exact nature of the infraction is not known. He may also be the William Paynel that gave the ecclesiastical tithe of Fontenay-le-Pesnel to Saint-Étienne Abbey in Caen in the late 1120s, but this is not certain.

== Service to Matilda ==
At the death of King Henry in 1135, he left only one legitimate child, Matilda. Her cousin Stephen of Blois seized the throne of England although in 1126 he had sworn to uphold Matilda's right to the throne. Stephen secured Normandy as well. In 1136 Matilda and her husband Count Geoffrey of Anjou contested Stephen's seizure of both England and Normandy, starting a civil war usually known as The Anarchy that lasted most of Stephen's reign until 1154. As part of Geoffrey and Matilda's efforts in Normandy, Paynel's castle at Les Moutiers-Hubert in Normandy was attacked by Geoffrey in September 1136.

By 1140, Paynel was a supporter of the Empress Matilda's efforts to gain the throne of England. In late 1140 he was named Matilda's castellan for Nottingham Castle, which had just been captured by Matilda's half-brother Robert of Gloucester. At the end of Lent in 1142 William Peverel seized the castle for the king's forces while Paynel was absent visiting the Empress. After Paynel's death, his sons were also supporters of the Empress, and lost control of Drax for this support, but by 1154 Hugh and Fulk split some of the English and Norman lands between themselves.

== Religious foundations ==
Paynel founded two religious houses – the Drax Priory at Drax in the 1130s and an abbey at Hambye in Normandy around 1145. Drax was a house of Augustinian canons. Besides his foundations and the earlier mentioned gifts, Paynel also gave gifts to Selby Abbey and Holy Trinity Priory in York. Paynel died around 1145 to 1147.

== Children and legacy ==
Paynel married twice. His first wife was a daughter of William fitzWimund. His second wife was Avice, the widow of William de Courcy and daughter of William Meschin. By his first wife, Paynel had four sons – Hugh, Fulk, Thomas and John. A daughter named Gertrude may possibly also be from this first marriage. The second marriage produced a daughter, Alice, who was Paynel's principal heiress. Hugh and Fulk received small portions of the lands in England and also Paynel's lands in Normandy. Hambye in the Cotentin went to Fulk and Les Moutiers-Hubert went to Hugh. Alice received the lands at Drax and Hooton Pagnell, and married twice, first to Richard de Courcy and second to Robert de Gant.
