= Feudal barony of Okehampton =

Barony in medieval Devon, England

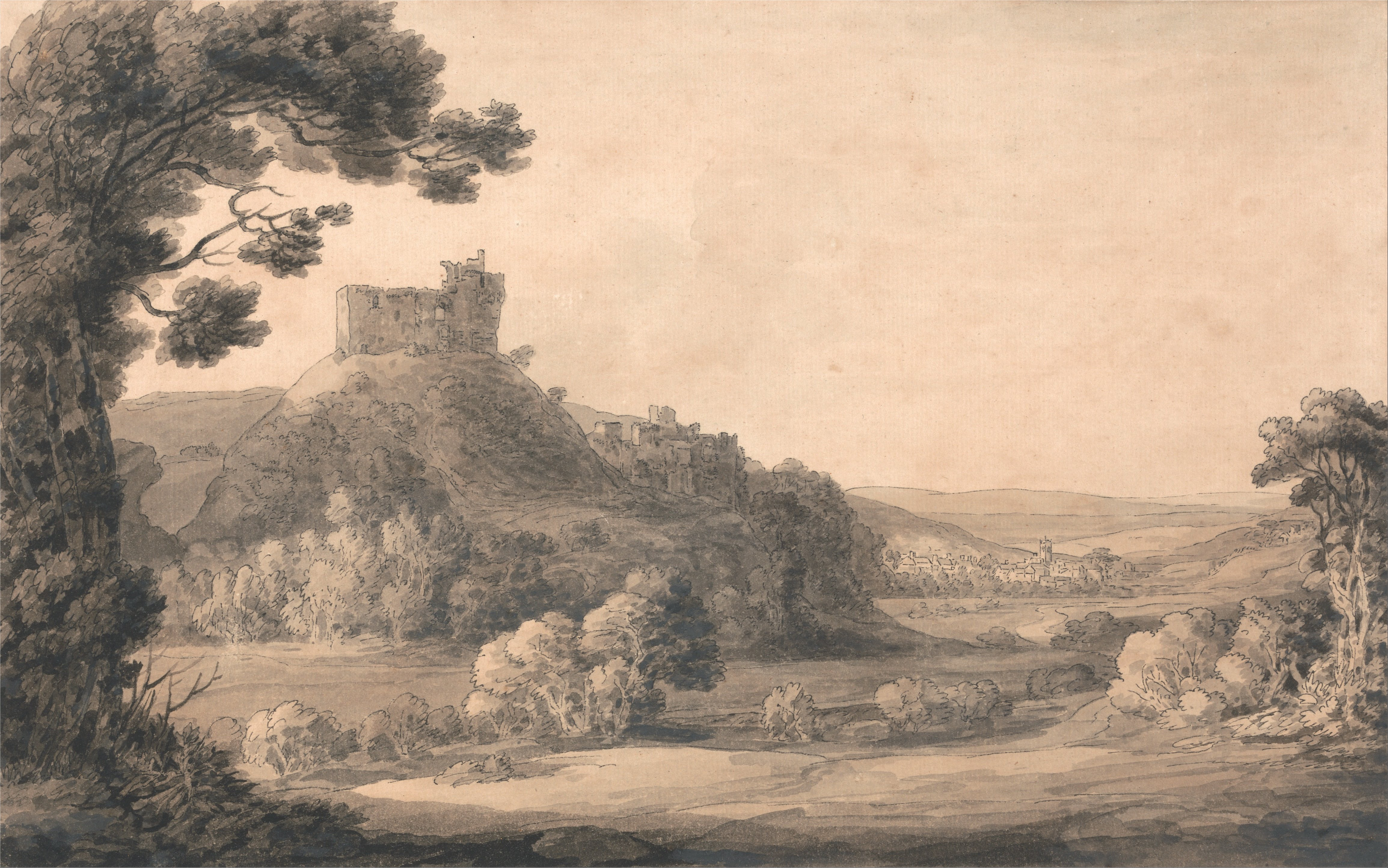
"A view of Okehampton Castle and town taken in the park", 1772 drawing by Francis Towne (1739–1816), Yale Center for British Art, New Haven, USA

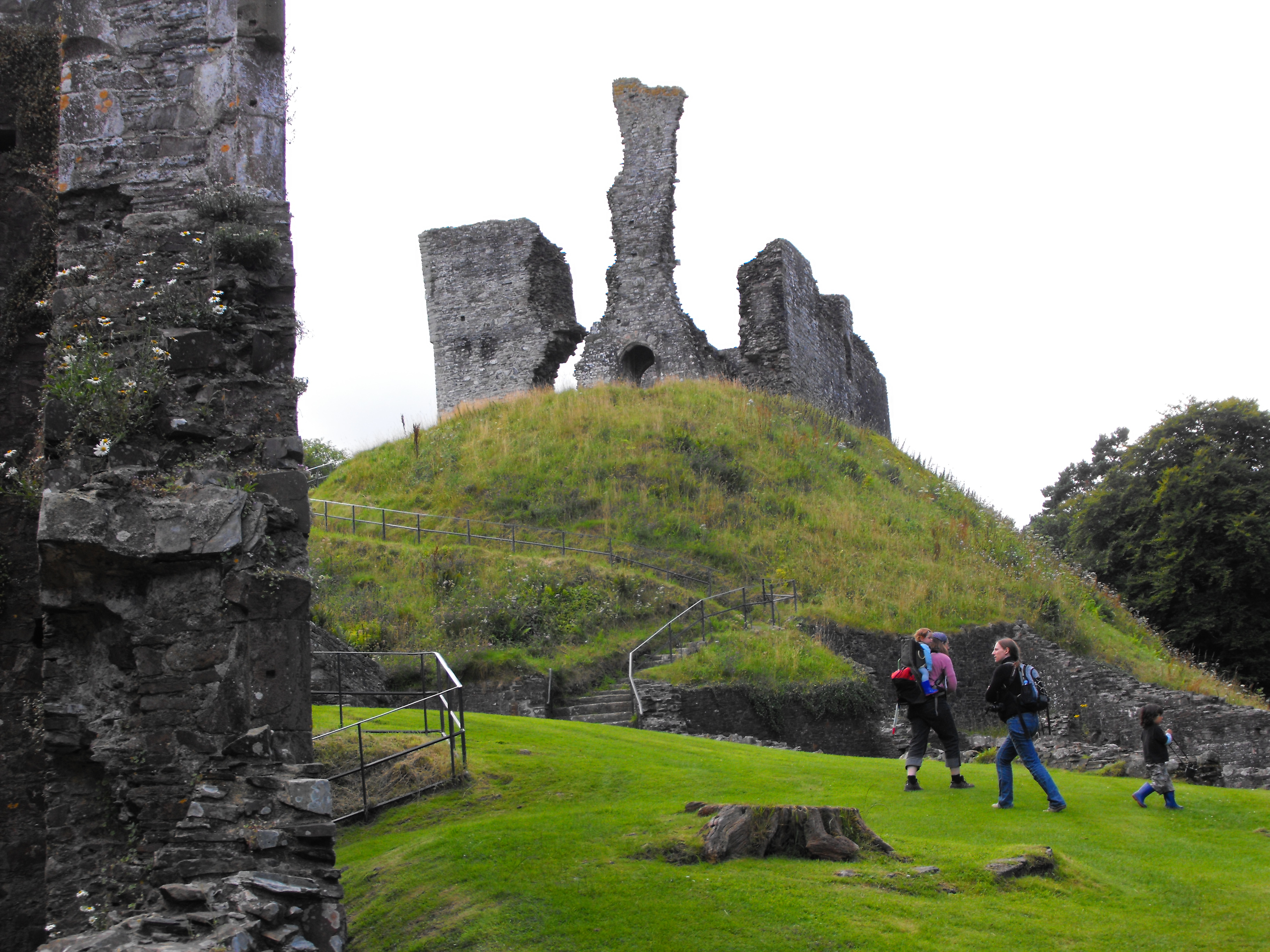
Remains of Okehampton Castle today

The feudal barony of Okehampton was a very large feudal barony, the largest mediaeval fiefdom in the county of Devon, England, whose caput was Okehampton Castle and manor. It was one of eight feudal baronies in Devonshire which existed during the mediaeval era.

== Descent ==
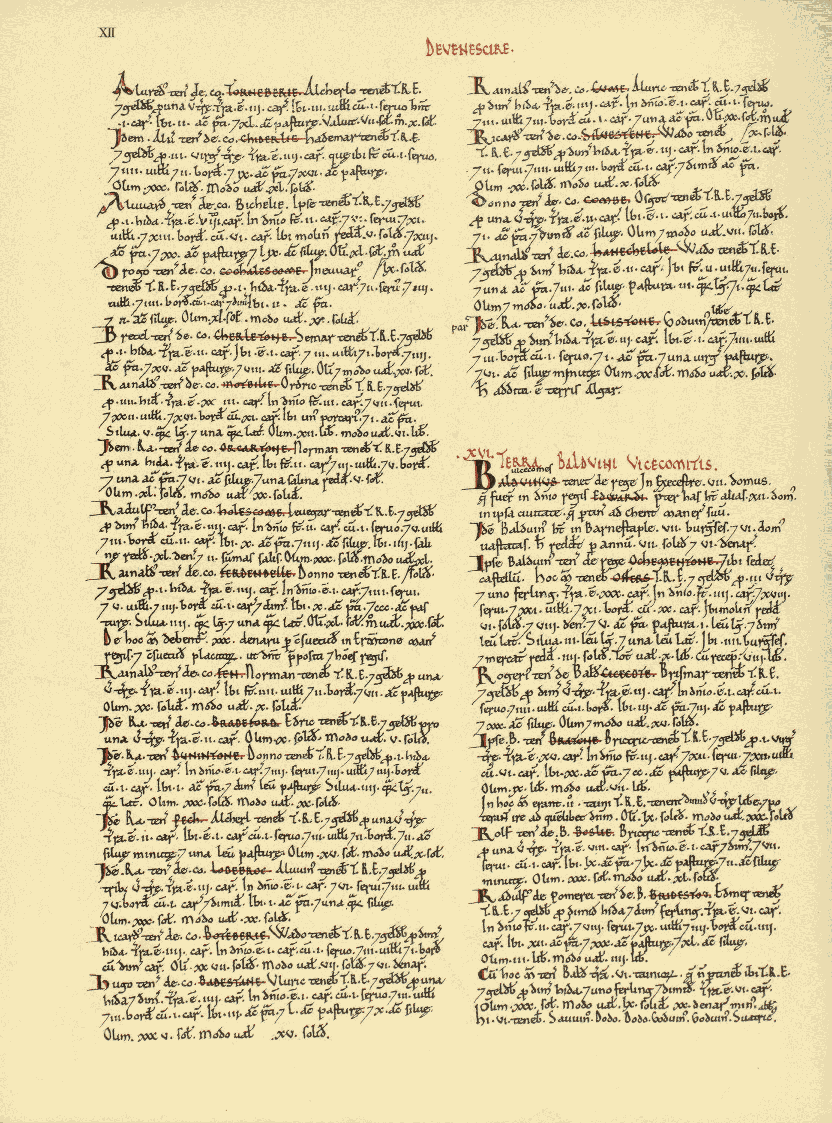
First folio of listing of Devonshire manors held by Baldwin the Sheriff, forming the feudal barony of Okehampton, Domesday Book, 1086.

The first holder of the feudal barony of Okehampton was Baldwin FitzGilbert (dead by Jan 1091) called in the Latin Domesday Book of 1086 Baldvinus Vicecomes, "Baldwin the Viscount" (of Devon), an office which equated to the earlier Saxon office of Sheriff of Devon. As younger son of Gilbert, Count of Brionne, he was cousin of William the Conqueror. His fiefdom listed in Domesday Book comprised 176 land-holdings, mostly manors, but 2 of which, listed first, comprised groups of houses in Barnstaple and Exeter. The third holding listed for his fiefdom is Okehampton: Ipse Balduin ten(et) de rege Ochementone, ibi sedet castellum ("Baldwin himself (i.e. in demesne) holds Okehampton from the king, there sits his castle"). The nature of the feudal land tenure for feudal barons was per baroniam, that is to say they were bound to serve the king as one of his barons, which involved onerous duties not only of attending parliaments to advise the king but also of providing knights and soldiers for military service to the royal army for specified periods each year. The baron himself was frequently present in battle.

=== Norman ===
The descent of Okehampton in the family of Baldwin fitzGilbert was as follows:

- Baldwin FitzGilbert (dead by Jan 1091), Sheriff of Devon. All three of his sons died successively without children.
- William FitzBaldwin (died 1096), son of Baldwin, died without children
- Robert FitzBaldwin (died 1101), brother of William, died without children
- Richard FitzBaldwin (died 1137), brother of Robert, Sheriff of Devon in 1096 and/or 1116, died without children. He founded Brightley Priory

The ownership of Okehampton then becomes obscure for two decades, before it was held by a descendant of Baldwin fitzGilbert.

- Maud d'Avranches (died 1173), daughter and sole-heiress of Robert d'Avranches, who was son of William fitzWimund by a daughter of Baldwin fitzGilbert. She married firstly William de Curci (died pre 1162), by him having a daughter Hawise. As a widow, she would remarry to Robert FitzRoy (died 1172), a natural son of King Henry I of England. By her second husband Maud had a further daughter, Maud du Sap (died 1224). Maud du Sap, following her father's death, became a royal ward, and King Henry II married her to Reginald I de Courtenay (died 1160).
- Hawise de Curci (died 1219), daughter Maud by William de Curci, married the step-son of her half-sister, Reginald de Courtenay. Through this marriage, the barony came into the possession of the Courtenay family.

=== Courtenay ===
Arms of Courtenay: Or, three torteaux

- Robert de Courtenay (died 1242), son of Reginald de Courtenay (died 1194) by his wife Hawise de Curci (died 1219), heiress of Okehampton. He married Mary de Vernon, daughter of William de Redvers, 5th Earl of Devon (died 1217), feudal baron of Plympton, Devon. From this marriage the Courtenays later inherited the barony of Plympton in 1293 and in 1335 were declared Earls of Devon.
- John de Courtenay (died 1274), (son) who married Isabel de Vere, daughter of Hugh de Vere, 4th Earl of Oxford (c. 1210 – 1263)
- Sir Hugh de Courtenay (died 1292), (son) who married Eleanor le Despenser (died 1328), daughter of Hugh le Despenser, 1st Earl of Winchester (1261–1326).
- Hugh Courtenay, 9th Earl of Devon (1276–1340), (son). In 1293 on the death of his cousin Isabella de Forz, Countess of Devon (1237–1293) (eldest daughter of Baldwin de Redvers, 6th Earl of Devon (1217–1245), feudal baron of Plympton in Devon) he became heir to the feudal barony of Plympton, and in 1335 was declared Earl of Devon. The descent of the feudal barony of Okehampton thenceforth follows the descent of the earldom of Devon. In 1539 King Henry VIII seized the lands of the barony and had Henry Courtenay, 1st Marquess of Exeter (died 1539) executed for treason. The Earldom of Devon became forfeit, and the Courtenay lands in Cornwall escheated (i.e. reverted) to the crown to be held by the Duchy of Cornwall.

== List of constituent manors ==
The barony comprised originally the following manors held in-chief per baroniam by Baldwin the Sheriff, in order of Domesday Book listing:

No.	Name of manor	Hundred	Baldwin's tenant	Pre-1066 tenant
1	19 houses in Exeter	Hundred	Unknown	Lordship of King Edward the Confessor
2	6 destroyed houses in Barnstaple	Hundred	Unknown	Unknown
3	Okehampton	Lifton	in demesne	Osferth
4	Chichacott	Lifton	Roger	Brictmer
5	Bratton Clovelly	Lifton	in demesne	Brictric
6	Boasley	Lifton	Rolf	Brictric
7	Bridestowe	Lifton	Ralpf de Pomeroy	Edmer
8	Germansweek	Lifton	Rainer	Ednoth
9	Lewtrenchard	Lifton	Roger de Meulles	Brictric
10	Warson	Lifton	Roger of Meulles	Waddell
11	Kelly	Lifton	Modbert	Osferth
12	Dunterton	Lifton	Ralph de Bruyère	Brictmer
13	Guscott	Lifton	Colwin	Brictric
14	Sampford Courtenay	Torrington	in demesne	Norman
15	Belstone	Torrington	Richard	Osferth
16	Dunsland	Torrington	Cadio	Wulfric
17	Monkokehampton	Torrington	Baldwin's tenant	re 1066 tenant
18	Exbourne	Torrington	Roger	Aelmer
19	Highampton	Torrington	Roger	Brictmer
20	Lashbrook	Torrington	Roger	Algar Long
21	Bradford	Torrington	in demesne	Algar Long
22	Kigbeare	Torrington	Rainer	Saewin
23	Inwardleigh	Torrington	Otelin	Ingvar
24	Oak	Torrington	Richard	Osgot
25	Gorhuish	Torrington	Bernard	Alnoth
26	Broadwood Kelly	Torrington	Modbert	Leofric
27	Honeychurch	Torrington	Walter	Alwin Black
28	Middlecott	Torrington	Ranulf	Alwold
29	Brixton	Torrington	Richard	Wulfnoth
30	Middlecott	Torrington	Richard	Alwold
31	Ashmansworthy	Hartland	Gilbert	Brictmer
32	Yarnscombe	Hartland	Robert	Godwin
33	Parkham	Merton	Richard	Algar
34	Little Torrington	Merton	Baldwin's tenant	Edmer
35	Heanton Satchville	Merton	Ralph de Bruyere	Edwin
36	Potheridge	Merton	Aubrey	Ulf
37	Stockleigh	Merton	Aubrey	Colwin
38	Woolladon	Merton	Aubrey	Saewin
39	Meeth	Merton	Bernard	Alnoth
40	Landcross	Merton	Robert	Aelfeva
41	Woolleigh	Merton	Colwin	Alsi
42	Helescane	Merton	William	Edric
43	Chawleigh	Shebbear	in demesne	Siward
44	Dolton	Shebbear	William son of Wimund	Ulf
Melhuish	Wonford	Hugh de Rennes	Brictmer of Rillaton	

== Sources ==
- Thorn, Caroline; Thorn, Frank (1985). "chapter 16". Domesday Book. John Morris. Vol. 9. Devon: Phillimore Press. pp. parts 1 & 2, holdings of Baldwin the Sheriff.
- Sanders, I.J. (1960). English Baronies: A Study of their Origin and Descent 1086-1327. Oxford. pp. 69–70, Barony of Okehampton.
- Pole, William (1791). Collections Towards a Description of the County of Devon. London. pp. 2–5, Barony of Okehampton.
