= Drax (surname) =

Drax is a surname, and may refer to:

- Henry Drax (c. 1693–1755), English politician
- James Drax (died 1662), Barbados plantation owner
- Reginald Drax (1880–1967), British admiral
- Richard Drax (born 1958), British politician
- Thomas Erle Drax (1721–1789), English politician
- Hugo Drax, fictional character in the James Bond novel Moonraker
