= Hugh de Courtenay, 1st/9th Earl of Devon =

English nobleman (1276–1340)

- Earl of Devon
- Arms of Hugh de Courtenay, 1st/9th Earl of Devon: Or, three torteaux a label of three points azure
- Tenure: 22 February 1335 – 23 December 1340
- Successor: Hugh de Courtenay, 2nd Earl of Devon
- Born: 14 September 1276; Okehampton, Devon, England.
- Died: 23 December 1340 (aged 64); Tiverton Castle, Devon, England.
- Residence: Tiverton Castle; Okehampton Castle; Colcombe Castle
- Noble family: Courtenay
- Spouse: Agnes de St John
- Issue: John de Courtenay, Abbot of Tavistock; Hugh de Courtenay, 2nd Earl of Devon; Eleanor de Courtenay, Baroness Grey of Codnor; Robert de Courtenay; Sir Thomas de Courtenay; Baldwin de Courtenay; Elizabeth de Courtenay, Lady Lisle
- Parents: Sir Hugh de Courtenay; Eleanor le Despenser

Hugh de Courtenay, 1st/9th Earl of Devon (14 September 1276 – 23 December 1340) of Tiverton Castle, Okehampton Castle, Plympton Castle and Colcombe Castle, all in Devon, feudal baron of Okehampton and feudal baron of Plympton, was an English nobleman. In 1335, forty-one years after the death of his second cousin once-removed Isabel de Redvers, suo jure 8th Countess of Devon (died 1293) he was officially declared Earl of Devon, although whether as a new creation or in succession to her is unknown, thus alternative ordinal numbers exist for this Courtenay earldom.

== Origins ==
Hugh de Courtenay was born on 14 September 1276, the son and heir of Sir Hugh de Courtenay (died 1292) of Okehampton Castle in Devon, feudal baron of Okehampton, by his wife, Eleanor le Despenser (died 1328), a daughter of Hugh le Despencer, 1st Baron le Despencer and sister of Hugh le Despenser, 1st Earl of Winchester, an important adviser to King Edward II. His father was the son of John de Courtenay (died c. 3 May 1274), feudal baron of Okehampton by his wife Lady Isabel de Vere, a daughter of Hugh de Vere, 4th Earl of Oxford. John's father, Robert de Courtenay (died 1242), son of Renaud de Courtenay (died 1190) and Hawise de Curcy (heiress of the feudal barony of Okehampton), had married Lady Mary de Redvers (sometimes called "de Vernon"), the daughter of William de Redvers, 5th Earl of Devon (died 1217) of Tiverton Castle and of Plympton Castle in Devon, feudal baron of Plympton.

== Paternal inheritance ==
On 28 February 1292, at about the time of his marriage, Hugh succeeded to the Okehampton estates and to the de Redvers estates that had not yet been alienated to the Crown. He may then have been styled Earl of Devon, the first of the Courtenay family, although was not recognised in the de facto of the Earldom until 1335. He built the original Colcombe Castle situated near the village of Colyton in Devon. With his father, he also rebuilt Okehampton Castle, expanding its facilities and accommodation to form a hunting lodge, retreat and luxurious residence. His main seat was at Tiverton Castle.

== Career ==
=== Campaign against Scotland, 1297–1300 ===
He did homage to King Edward I of England on 20 June 1297, and was granted his own livery. At the time, the King was with his army crossing the River Tweed into Scotland. It is probable that the honour was in acknowledgement of Hugh's military achievements. That July, the English defeated and humiliated the Scots at Irvine. However, the following year, the tables were turned on the advent of the remarkable campaign of William Wallace.

From 6 February 1298, he was summoned by writ to Parliament as Lord Courtenay, and would sit throughout the reign of King Edward II and into the Mortimer Regency for the King's son. He remained an important noble at Parliaments, into the reign of King Edward III.

Courtenay joined King Edward I at the long siege of Caerlaverock Castle, just over the Solway Firth, for a fortnight in July 1300. He proved himself a fine soldier and loyal adherent to the English crown. He had not been present at the Battle of Stirling Bridge outside Stirling Castle in 1298, during which half the English contingent were killed, including commander Hugh Cressingham. But the King was determined to march into Ayrshire, to devastate the properties of King Robert I of Scotland. However, the English army melted away into the forests as the army moved further northwards. Courtenay may have been with the English King when he sat down in Sweetheart Abbey to receive Robert Winchelsey, Archbishop of Canterbury, who had travelled north with a demanding missive from Pope Boniface to cease hostilities. The King could not ignore this order. In September, he disbanded troops and withdrew over the Solway Firth to Carlisle. The campaign had failed due to a shortage of money, so Parliament was recalled for January 1301. Before returning to London, the English then drew up a six months truce.

=== Parliament of 1301 ===
Parliament met at Lincoln. The agenda included redrafting the Royal Forest Charter, which had no precedent since it was first introduced in the reign of Henry II, 150 years earlier. Local juries were expected to "perambulate the forests" to gather evidence. But the King needed money and was required by Parliament to surrender his absolute authority and ownership of what became community forests.

=== Campaigns against Scotland, 1301–1308 ===
In 1306, the Prince of Wales was despatched into Scotland; the vanguard was led by Aymer de Valence, the King's half-uncle. On 22 May, Courtenay was knighted by the Prince, presumably for his efforts against the Scots. In June, the English occupied Perth. On 19 June, Valence, who had cut a swathe through the Lowlands, fell on the Scots army at Methven in the early dawn. The Scottish king, Robert Bruce, fled into the hills. King Edward I was merciless, and many prisoners were punished. That autumn, the army returned to Hexham. The war was all but over: there were however sieges at Mull of Kintyre and Kildrummy Castle, Aberdeenshire. The English king committed many atrocities, rounding up the Scots aristocracy and their women.

Then as King Robert returned from exile in Ireland, the English army started losing battles. King Edward I, now ailing, had one last campaign in which Courtenay played a major part. Struggling into the saddle towards the Solway Firth, King Edward died at Burgh by Sands, awaiting a crossing. In 1308, a new campaign was sent to quell King Robert, and Courtenay was made a knight banneret, one of the King's elite household.

During the reign of King Edward II, he was made a Lord Ordainer, one of the ruling council in the Lords. He was appointed to the King's Council on 9 Augustus 1318. He was appointed the Warden of the coast of Devon and Cornwall in 1324, and then again in 1336, because his estates stretched across what is now Exmoor and Dartmoor. But he took the honours reluctantly, and played a guarded game with King and Parliament.

As a veteran campaigner, he later aimed to ingratiate himself with young King Edward III, and so refused the Third Penny from the Exchequer. He was investigated, and on 22 February 1335, created as Earl of Devon, being restored to his ancestral line.

== Declared Earl of Devon ==
In 1335, forty-one years after the death of his second-cousin once removed Isabel de Redvers, suo jure 8th Countess of Devon (died 1293) (eldest daughter of Baldwin de Redvers, 6th Earl of Devon), letters patent were granted by King Edward III of England, dated 22 February 1335, declaring him Earl of Devon, and stating that he 'should assume such title and style as his ancestors, Earls of Devon, had wont to do so'. This thus made him 1st Earl of Devon, if the letters patent are deemed to have created a new peerage, otherwise 9th Earl of Devon, if it is deemed restitution of the old dignity of the de Redvers family, and he is deemed to have succeeded the suo jure 8th Countess of Devon. Authorities differ in their opinions, and thus alternative ordinal numbers exist for this Courtenay earldom.

== Marriage and children ==
Arms of St John: Argent, on a chief gules two mullets or

He married Agnes de Saint John (d.1340), a daughter of John Saint John (d. 1302) of Basing in Hampshire (by his wife Alice FitzPiers, daughter of Sir Reynold FitzPiers.) and a sister of John St John, 1st Baron St John (d. 1329) of Basing. By his wife he had five sons and two daughters:

- John de Courtenay (1300–1349), first son, Prior of Lewes and Abbot of Tavistock.
- Hugh de Courtenay, 2nd/10th Earl of Devon (1303-1377), second son, who married Lady Margaret de Bohun, daughter of Humphrey de Bohun, 4th Earl of Hereford by Princess Elizabeth of Rhuddlan, daughter of King Edward I and Eleanor of Castile.
- Lady Eleanor de Courtenay (c.1305–1330), who married John Grey, 3rd Baron Grey of Codnor (died 1392).
- Robert de Courtenay (1309–1334) of Moreton Hampstead in Devon, third son.
- Sir Thomas de Courtenay (c.1311-1362) of Wootton Courtenay, Somerset, and of Woodhuish, Brixham, Devon, fourth son, a military commander against the French. He married a great Somerset heiress, Muriel de Moels, the eldest of the two daughters and co-heiresses of John Moels, 4th Baron Moels, feudal baron of North Cadbury in Somerset. His wife's share of her paternal inheritance included the manors of Kings Carswell and Dunterton in Devon, and Blackford, Holton, and Lattiford in Somerset.
- Baldwin de Courtenay (c.1313-1340), fifth son.
- Lady Elizabeth de Courtenay (c.1313-c.1364), who married Bartholomew de Lisle, Lord Lisle (1311-1345).

== Death and burial ==
Courtenay died at Tiverton Castle on 23 December 1340, and was buried at Cowick Priory, near Exeter, on 5 February 1341.

== Footnotes ==
Peerage of England
Unknown Title last held by Isabella de Forz	Earl of Devon; 1335–1340	Succeeded by Hugh Courtenay
