= William fitzWimund =

12th-century Norman nobleman in England

William fitzWimund was a Norman landholder in England after the Norman Conquest.

FitzWimund was from Avranches in Normandy, where he held land. In Domesday Book fitzWimund is recorded as holding land in Exeter as a tenant of Baldwin fitzGilbert.

FitzWimund married a daughter of his overlord, Baldwin FitzGilbert. She may possibly have been named Matilda, as she is given that name on a document dated in 1066 but that must date later than that, as the text of the document refers to Michael, Bishop of Avranches, who was bishop from 1069 to 1084.

FitzWimund donated to abbey at Mont-Saint-Michel.

FitzWimund probably died before 1130. His son, Robert d'Avranches, married Hadvise, daughter of Gelduin of Dol. A daughter married William Paynel, but her name is not known.
