= Drax Priory =

Medieval English monastic house

Coordinates: 53°44′55.5″N 0°59′22.1″W

Drax Priory was an Augustinian priory at Drax in North Yorkshire, England, founded between 1130 and 1139 by William Paynel. The Priory has sometimes been called an abbey, though this is judged to be incorrect. Permission was given to crenellate the priory in 1362.

The Priory was run down in 1535 with the Dissolution of the Monasteries and the land was leased to Sir Marmaduke Constable to be used as a farm. In 1997, a geophysical survey and aerial imaging was undertaken which revealed wall lines of buried buildings and former ponds.

The monks at Drax owned lands in Ryecroft and St Ives (both near Bingley) in what is now West Yorkshire. These lands were granted to the monks by Adam De Birkin between 1165 and 1185.
