= Dunterton =

Village in Devon, England

Coordinates: 50.5913°N 4.2946°W

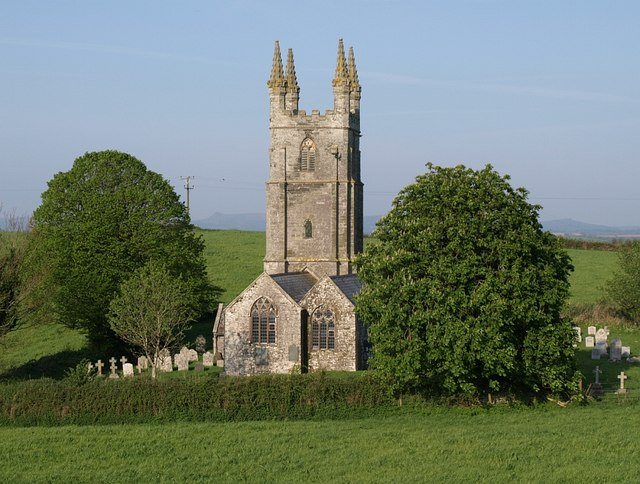
- All Saints' Church, Dunterton

- Location within Devon
- Civil parish: Dunterton
- Shire county: Devon
- Region: South West
- Country: England
- Sovereign state: United Kingdom
- Post town: Tavistock
- Postcode district: PL19
- Police: Devon and Cornwall
- Fire: Devon and Somerset
- Ambulance: South Western

Dunterton is a civil parish and small village in the Tavistock district in the county of Devon, England. The parish was mentioned in the Domesday Book, valued at 2 pounds and containing 18 households. In 1872 it had a population of 181.
