= Moretonhampstead and South Devon Railway =

Disused railway line in Devon, England

Overview
- Headquarters: Newton Abbot
- Locale: England
- Dates of operation: 1866–1972
- Successor: South Devon Railway

Technical
- Track gauge: 4 ft 8 1/2 in (1,435 mm)
- Previous gauge: 7 ft 1/4 in (2,140 mm)
- Length: 12.35 miles (19.88 km)

The Moretonhampstead and South Devon Railway was a railway which linked the South Devon Railway at Newton Abbot railway station with Bovey (in the town of Bovey Tracey), Lustleigh and Moretonhampstead, Devon, England. Originally built to the broad gauge of 7 ft 1/4 in (2,140 mm), it was later converted to standard gauge.

== History ==
Moretonhampstead and South Devon Railway Act 1862
- Act of Parliament
- Parliament of the United Kingdom
- Long title: An Act for incorporating a Company for making a Railway in the County of Devon, to be called "The Moretonhampstead and South Devon Railway;" and for other Purposes.
- Citation: 25 & 26 Vict. c. cxxviii

Dates
- Royal assent: 7 July 1862

Text of statute as originally enacted

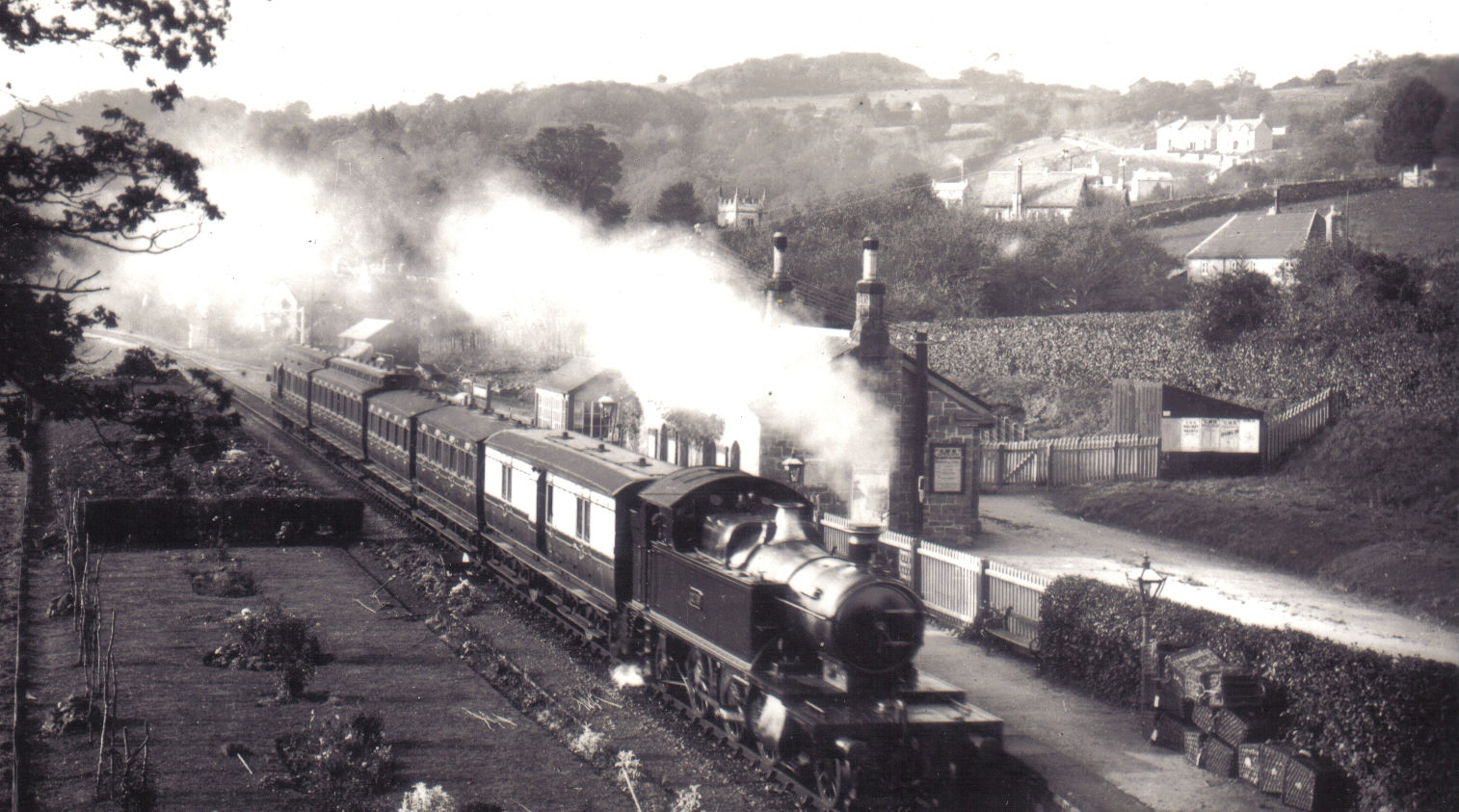
Lustleigh Station in 1912

In 1861 the Moretonhampstead and South Devon Railway Company was formed at the Globe Hotel in Newton Abbot, and in 1862 the bill for making the railway was given royal assent as the Moretonhampstead and South Devon Railway Act 1862 (25 & 26 Vict. c. cxxviii). Work on the line commenced in 1863, and the major earthworks (with cuttings and embankments, many still visible today) were complete. All the granite used for construction of the bridges was cut from Lustleigh Cleave. The line was 12 miles 28 chains (12.35 mi; 19.9 km) long.

- A Railway commencing by a Junction with the South Devon Railway in the Parish of Wolborough in the County of Devon, and terminating in the Parish of Moretonhampstead in the same County.
— Section 21, Moretonhampstead and South Devon Railway Act 1862 (25 & 26 Vict. c. cxxviii)

Following a Board of Trade inspection, the branch line opened to the public on 4 July 1866 although the directors had a ceremonial opening on 26 June. A public holiday was observed, with people turning out to witness the first journey from Newton Abbot to Moretonhampstead.

In 1892, the 7 ft 1/4 in (2,140 mm) broad gauge line was replaced by a 4 ft 8 1/2 in (1,435 mm) standard gauge format, taking only 32 hours and 60 men to complete – part of the wider conversion of the whole network.

The railway brought tourists to the area. Other users of the service were local industries: farmers' produce, nursery plants and blacksmiths' products were sent by train.

Traffic grew from 1866 to the 1930s and then went into decline. Despite a significant summer tourist trade, featuring in many contemporary guide books, traffic on the branch over the year was not enough to cover rising costs.

=== Closure ===
In 1957, the possibility of closure was reported in the Mid Devon Advertiser and on 28 February 1959 the last passenger service ran down the line, although a freight operation still ran. The line closed on 6 April 1964.

The last special passenger train ran as far as Bovey Tracey on 5 July 1970; by 8 September the lifting of the track north of Heathfield had been completed. The section of line around the town was converted to use as a road bypass on the A382 road, opening in 1987. The former Bovey railway station was retained at the side of the road and is now a heritage centre.

Oil and ball clay trains continued to operate on the south section of the line below Heathfield until the late 1990's, The Gulf Oil distribution terminal closure saw the last rail movement in January 1996.Transport of bagged ball clay product from the ECC site east of Heathfield continued to use the branch The remaining section of the branch was taken out of use in 2009 when 'temporary stop blocks' were placed on the line 53 chains (1.1 km) from the junction at Newton Abbot.

However, in December 2011 it was announced that this section of the line would be re-opened to facilitate the transport of timber from Heathfield to North Wales. In the same month a timber siding was opened at Teigngrace, just before the level crossing at Exeter Road, to allow the timber to be loaded onto the freight trains. Due to the lack of a passing loop at Teigngrace, the train and its empty wagons continues up the line to Heathfield where the engine can run around the carriages using the loop in the disused station. The empty freight train then drives back to the timber sidings at Teigngrace to be loaded. Loading of the timber is carried out by the lorries that bring the timber to the sidings.

Several miles of the line between Bovey and Lustleigh, some of which is now a path open to the public, are being developed by the council to become a cycle track known as the Wray Valley Trail. As part of this the previously demolished bridge deck over the A382 road was replaced in March 2011 by a new lattice girder structure. The old Lustleigh station house is visible from the old railway bridge at Brookfield, as are the Brookfield, Caseley and Knowle bridges.

=== Chronology ===
- 1862 Moretonhampstead and South Devon Railway authorised by Act of Parliament
- 1866 Railway opened
- 1872 Amalgamated with the South Devon Railway Company
- 1876 South Devon Railway amalgamated with the Great Western Railway
- 1882 Standard gauge Teign Valley Railway opened from Heathfield
- 1892 Broad gauge converted to standard gauge
- 1928 Brimley Halt opened
- 1948 Great Western Railway nationalised into British Railways
- 1955 Hawkmoor Halt renamed to Pullabrook Halt
- 1959 Passenger trains withdrawn
- 1964 Goods trains withdrawn beyond Bovey
- 1966 Gulf Oil open oil distribution terminal at Heathfield
- 1970 Goods trains withdrawn beyond Heathfield
- 1996 Closure of oil terminal at Heathfield
- 2011 Goods trains reinstated as far as Heathfield to serve a timber siding at Teigngrace.
- 2015 Goods services withdrawn with last goods train running on 2 April 2015. (Timber loading moved to Riverside Yard, Exeter).

== Proposed reopening ==
The line was suggested in 2019 by Campaign for a Better Transport as a 'priority 2' candidate for reopening.

A section of embankment and track between Newton Abbot and Teigngrace was washed away during Storm Bert over the weekend of 23–24 November 2024.

== Route ==
The Down direction was from Newton Abbot to Moretonhampstead, broadly northwards.

The route rises gradually from Newton Abbot as far as Heathfield, and the gradient then steepens, climbing continuously from Bovey with a long length at 1 in 49 from Lustleigh.

- Newton Abbot goods yard was positioned alongside the branch from June 1911, having been relocated to make space for the passenger station enlargement. It was on the Down (west) side of the line and had twelve roads. Newton Abbot Goods signal box was provided at the north end, until 1926 when it was replaced by a ground frame. Goods traffic ceased in 1970.

The Stover Canal ran alongside the line on the Up side from near Kingsteignton bridge to Ventiford Bridge, a little north of Teigngrace.

- Nearly a mile further were Teignbridge sidings, laid in 1890.
- Teigngrace station was provided at the insistence of the Lord of the Manor of Stover. It was closed from 1 January 1917 to 1 May 1919 as a war economy measure.
- Heathfield station. This was originally named Chudleigh Road, and was renamed from 2 October 1882. The line from Exeter via Chudleigh terminated here in a north-east facing bay platform; it was only connected for shunting movements until 2 October 1916, when a running connection was provided; it was made a full double junction from May 1943. The intention was to make the Chudleigh route a diversionary route if the Dawlish route should become blocked by enemy action.
- Brimley Halt. Opened 21 May 1928.
- Bovey. Served the community of Bovey Tracey.
- Pullabrook Halt. Opened as Hawkmoor until 13 June 1955. It served Hawkmoor County Sanatorium.
- Lustleigh.
- Moretonhampstead. The terminus had an all-over roof covering the platform and the run-round loop.

These pictures show the journey of the last special passenger train to Bovey Tracey on 5 July 1970.

Teigngrace station building

Teigngrace

The Devon Clay Company siding near Heathfield

The train at Heathfield station

The trackwork of the Gulf Oil Depot between Heathfield and Brimley Halt

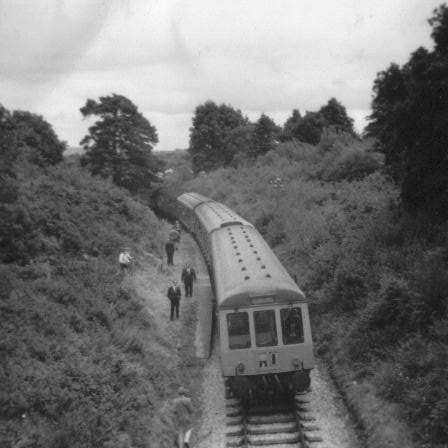
The train at Brimley Halt

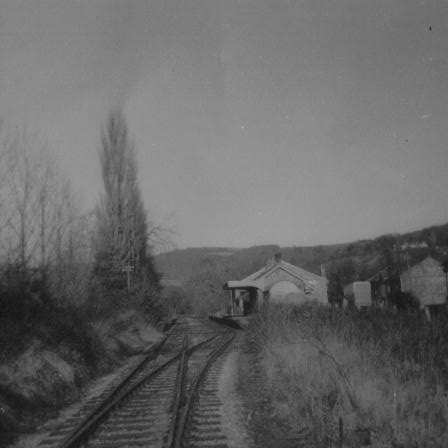
Bovey Tracey station

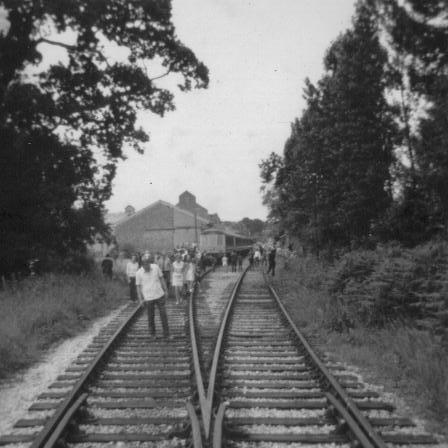
The train at Bovey Tracey

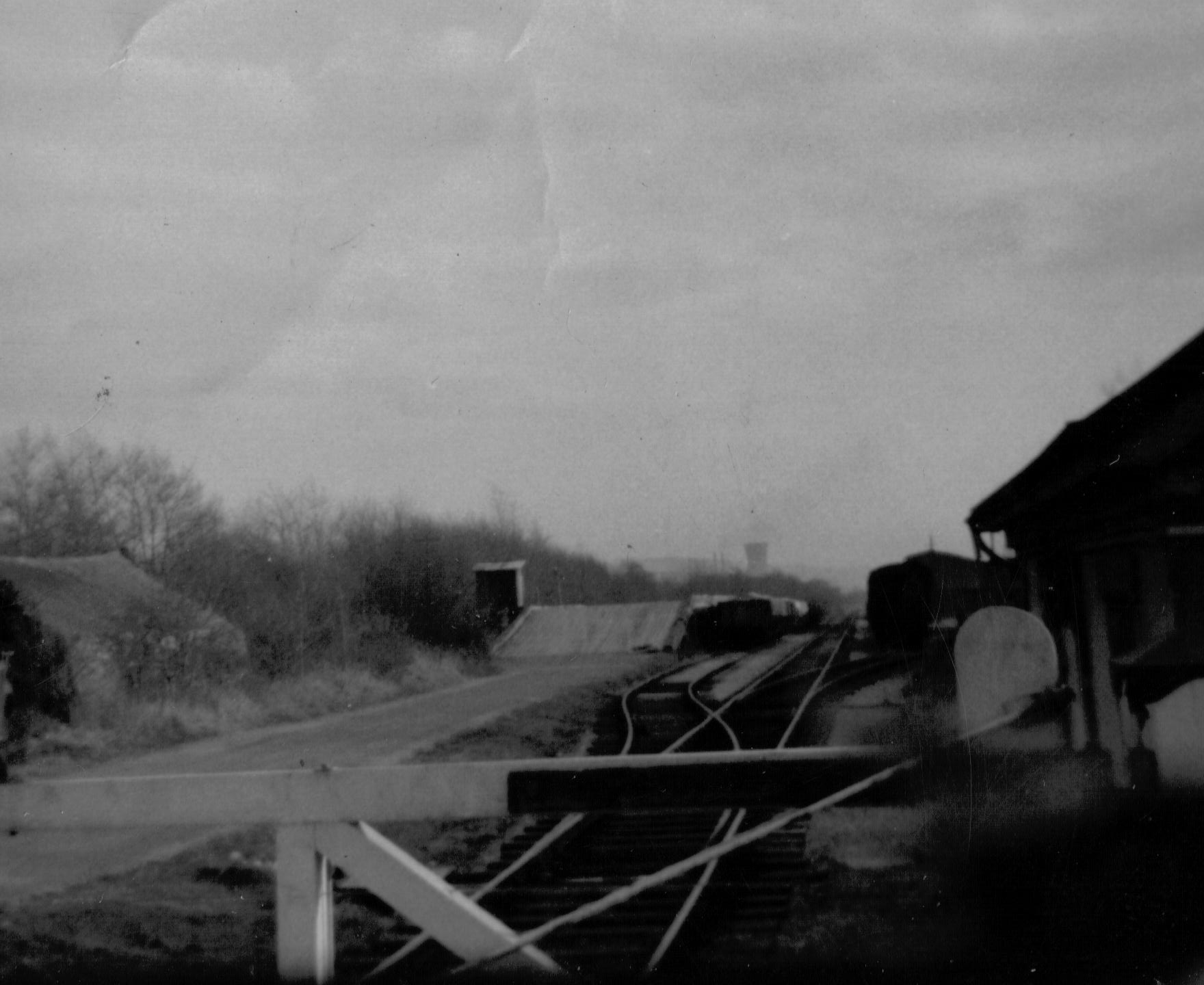
Teigngrace clay sidings

== Cultural impact ==
A version of The Hound of the Baskervilles was filmed at Lustleigh in the early months of 1931 for which it was temporarily renamed 'Baskerville'.

== See also ==
- Haytor Granite Tramway granite siding near Bovey
