= Hawley Hospital =

- Shown in Devon

Geography
- Location: Barnstaple, Devon, England, United Kingdom
- Coordinates: 51.0788°N 4.04234°W

Organisation
- Care system: Public NHS
- Type: Specialist

Services
- Speciality: Tuberculosis

History
- Founded: 1920
- Closed: 1963

Links
- Lists: Hospitals in England

The Hawley Hospital was a specialist hospital in Barnstaple, Devon, founded in 1920 as a pulmonary tuberculosis sanatorium as part of a network of such facilities, instigated by the Public Health (Tuberculosis Regulations) 1912.

== History ==
The hospital was set up to take tuberculosis (TB) patients in the North Devon area, and was administratively linked to the Hawkmoor County Sanatorium near Bovey Tracey, with the building complete in 1920.

Staff shortages in 1946 led to a restriction on the admission of patients, and led the Devon Public Health Committee to consider its closure.

It joined the NHS in 1948, and was placed in to the Exeter Special Hospital Management Committee, which looked after the specialist TB, smallpox, and isolation hospitals.

In 1949, 23 patients were admitted and 17 discharged, with two patients dying and 2 being transferred to other hospitals.

The hospital was closed on 31 March 1963, with all patients and future treatment transferred to Hawkmoor Hospital.

== Location ==
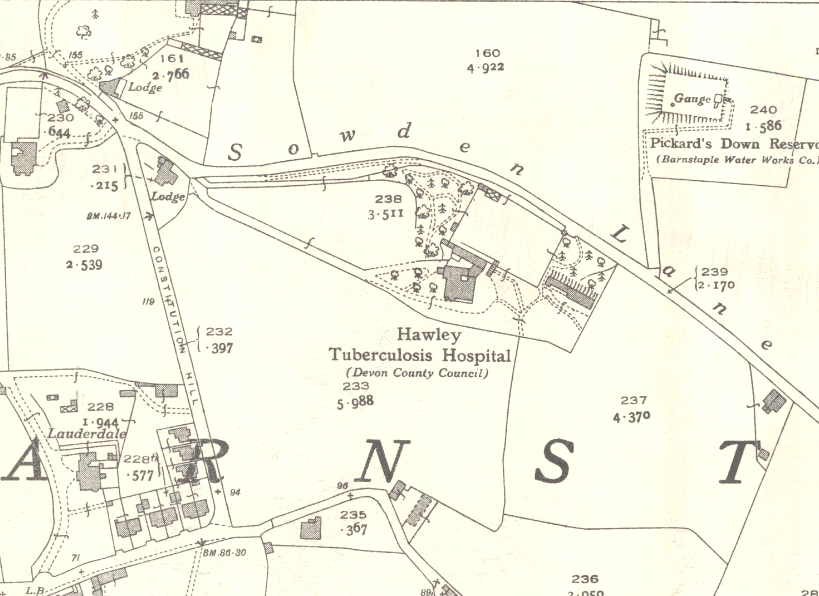
OS map of Hawley Hospital in Barnstaple, Devon in 1939

The hospital was located on Sowden Lane, to the East of the centre of Barnstaple.

The site is now a housing estate, still bearing road names such as Hawley Manor and Hawley Close.
