= Hawkmoor =

Hawkmoor can refer to:

- Hawkmoor (television series), a 1970s BBC television series based in a 16th-century Welsh folk hero
- Hawkmoor County Sanatorium, also known as Hawkmoor Hospital, a now closed pulmonary disorders and mental health hospital in Devon, England
