= Brimley Halt railway station =

Disused railway station in Devon, England

Coordinates: 50.5856°N 3.6793°W

Brimley Halt
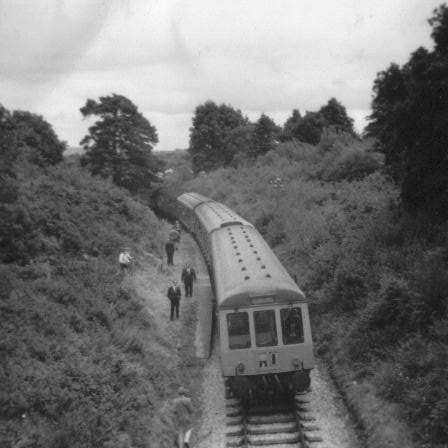
- Brimley Halt with a special train in 1970

General information
- Location: Brimley, Teignbridge; England
- Grid reference: SX8121177562
- Platforms: 1

Other information
- Status: Disused

History
- Post-grouping: Great Western Railway

Key dates
- 21 May 1928: Opened
- 2 March 1959: Closed to passengers
- 5 July 1970: last train used the station
Location

Brimley Halt was a railway station opened in 1928 by the Great Western Railway (GWR) to serve the south end of Bovey Tracey in South Devon, England. It had a single platform and was on a curved section of track without a passing loop or sidings. After closure to regular passenger services in 1959, its last known use by a passenger train was a special train to Bovey Tracey which stopped at Brimley Halt on 5 July 1970.

Gulf Oil depot near Brimley Halt, 1970

The track had been lifted by 8 September 1975. The site of the station was destroyed by the construction of a new A382 road along the course of the trackbed.

Preceding station	Disused railways	Following station
Heathfield	Moretonhampstead and South Devon Railway; Great Western Railway	Bovey
