= Hawkmoor Hospital =

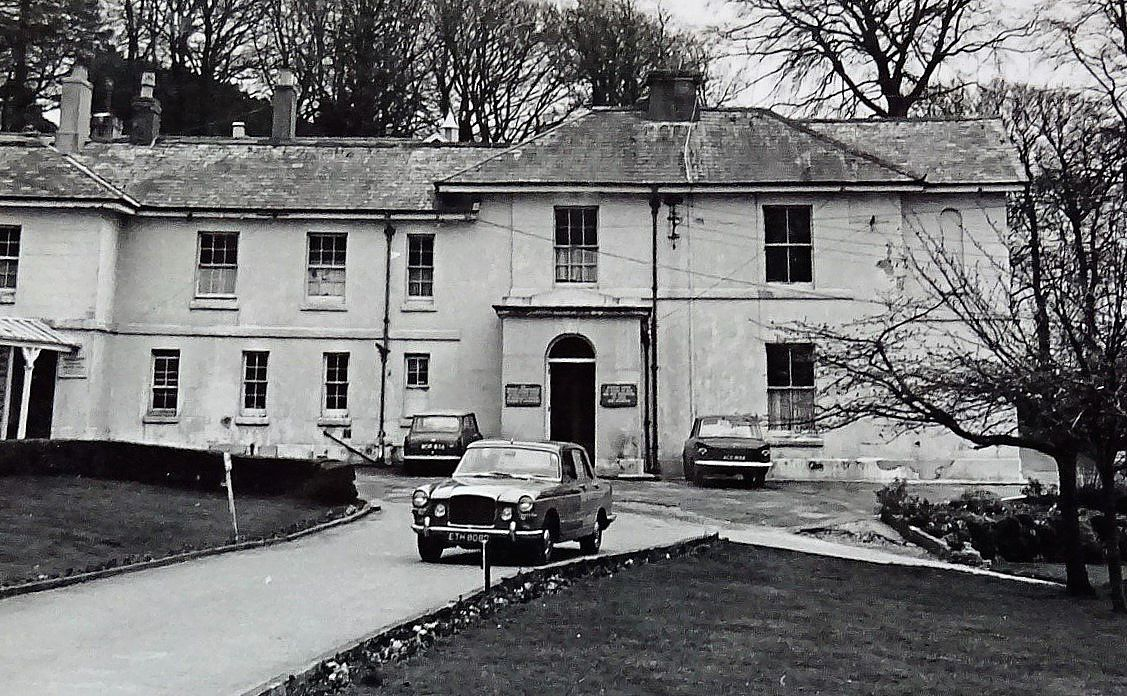
- Hawkmoor House, Hawkmoor Hospital

- Shown in Devon

Geography
- Location: Bovey Tracey, Devon, England, United Kingdom
- Coordinates: 50.6157°N 3.6935°W

Organisation
- Care system: Public NHS
- Type: Specialist

Services
- Speciality: 1913-1948 Tuberculosis; 1948-1972 Pulmonary disorders, chest surgery, mental disability 1972-1987 Mental disability

History
- Founded: 1913
- Closed: 1987

Links
- Lists: Hospitals in England

Hawkmoor Hospital, originally known as Hawkmoor County Sanatorium, was a specialist hospital near Bovey Tracey in Devon, England, founded in 1913 as a pulmonary tuberculosis sanatorium as part of a network of such facilities, instigated by the Public Health (Tuberculosis Regulations) 1912. From 1948, the hospital catered for patients with a range of chest ailments (including tuberculosis), as well as chest surgery, and mental disability patients. From 1973, the facility dealt solely with mental health problems until its closure in 1987.

== History ==
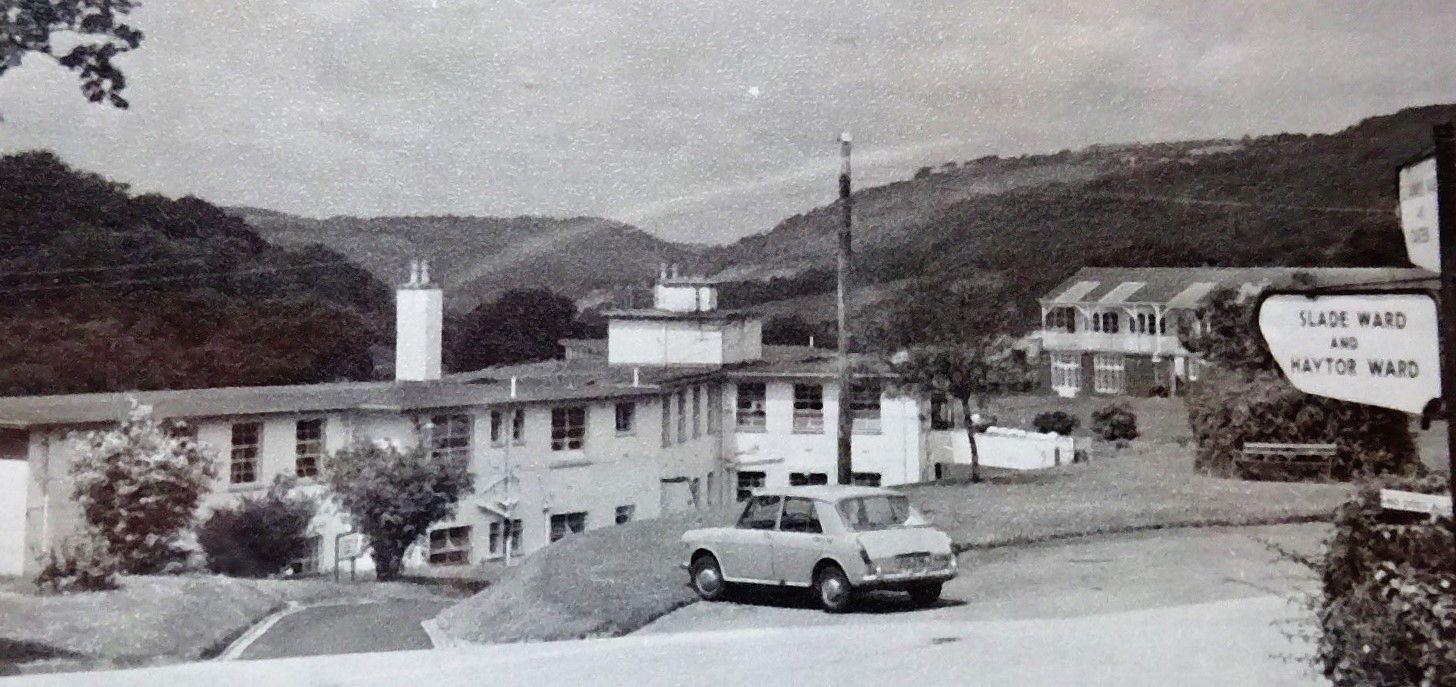
Wards at Hawkmoor Hospitals

The hospital, which formed part of a nationwide network of sanatoria designed for the treatment of pulmonary tuberculosis and made possible by central government grants worth £1.5 million awarded under the Finance Act 1912, opened in 1913. The sanatorium initially opened in temporary accommodation with 40 beds available. The main building not completed until over a year later. Training of nurses was shared by arrangement with the Royal Cornwall Infirmary in Truro.

In 1925, the sanatorium innovated with the production of prints of chest x-rays straight on to bromide paper, with copies then be added to the patient's file and straight to the local tuberculosis officer.

After the sanatorium joined the National Health Service in 1948, the scope of treatment offered was expanded to include all pulmonary disorders as well as the acceptance of mental health services. It opened a specialist thoracic surgery unit and also offered services to treat conditions such as sarcoidosis and pulmonary carcinoma from 1950. It was generally known as Hawkmoor Chest Hospital, or simply as Hawkmoor Hospital.

In 1948, Hawkmoor, with its 210 beds, was the largest hospital in the Exeter Special Management Committee, which managed all the TB and smallpox hospitals in the area. In 1949, the training of nurses was moved to Royal Devon and Exeter, being somewhat closer than Plymouth and Truro.

By the mid-1950s, the hospital was taking a range of conditions including treating trauma from motoring injuries, and dealing with children swallowing foreign bodies. The average length of stay at Hawkmoor was six months, compared to three weeks at a normal general hospital. The hospital became the area's main chest and thoracic surgery centre, although staff recruitment and retention proved an issue, with staff seconded over from Torbay Hospital as required.

The hospital had close ties with the 'league of friends' and other co-operative societies from the other local hospitals in Torbay and Newton Abbot, who often helped with the fundraising for facilities and equipment at Hawkmoor, due to the high number of people from those areas treated at Hawkmoor.

Tuberculosis gradually declined, with TB making up less than 20% of the caseload of the hospital by 1962, and other hospitals in Devon, such as the Hawley Hospital in Barnstaple were closed in 1963, leading to TB patients from across the county being taken to Hawkmoor.

In 1966, the hospital was criticised for not having a mechanical ventilator available, leading to one having to be rushed from Chesham in Buckinghamshire under police escort as well as special traffic light control, for a baby who developed complications after an operation, with the cost of the transport operation being as much as the purchase of the machine would have cost.

By the early 1970s, the hospital was treating a number of patients with mental or learning disabilities.

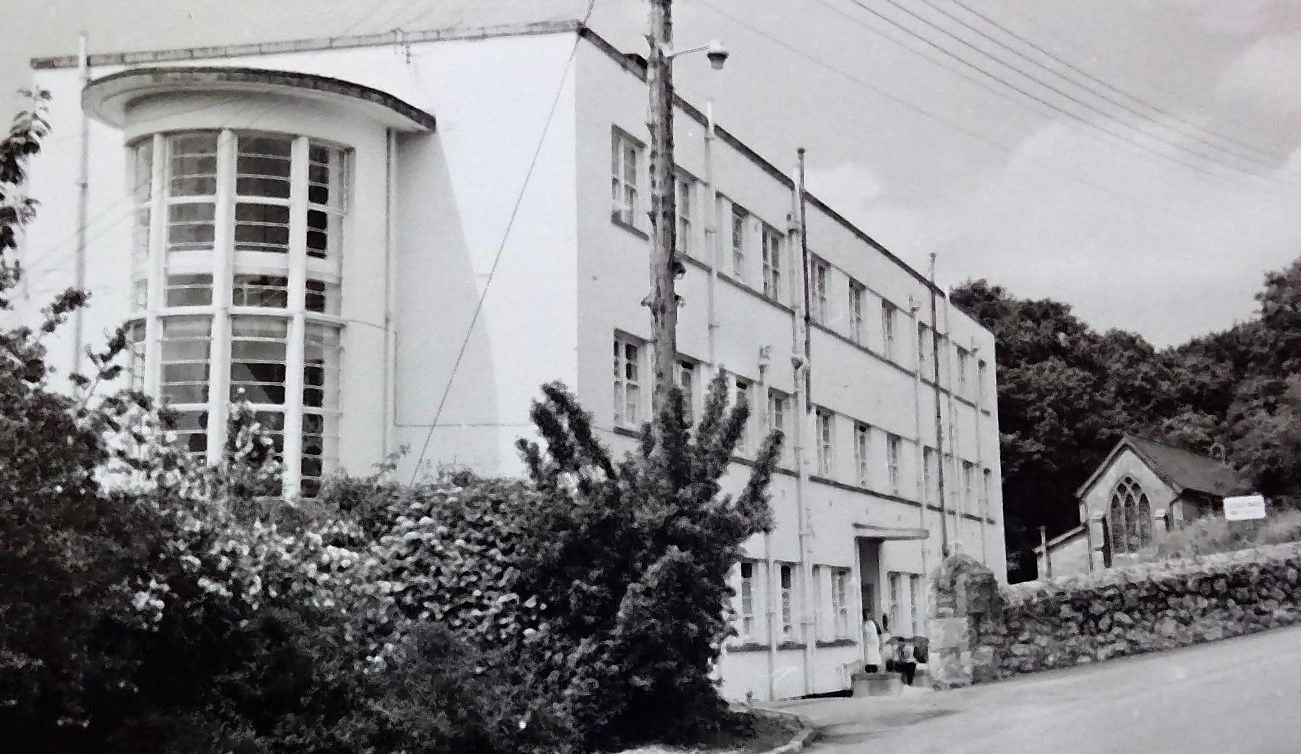
Ward and chapel at Hawkmoor Hospital

In 1972, the pulmonary disease facilities were withdrawn, and in 1973 it was announced that chest surgery would be moved from Hawkmoor to the new Wonford hospital when it was completed in 1974, and that the hospital would then specialise in mental disability.

In the mid-1980s the closure of the hospital was announced. Controversy was created when some residents were moved to a facility in Bovey Tracey, newly purchased by the health authority.

The hospital closed on 31 July 1987, with all the contents from the hospital, as well as on-site church, and theatre sold by auction.

The site has since been redeveloped for residential use as Hawkmoor Parke.

== Site and buildings ==
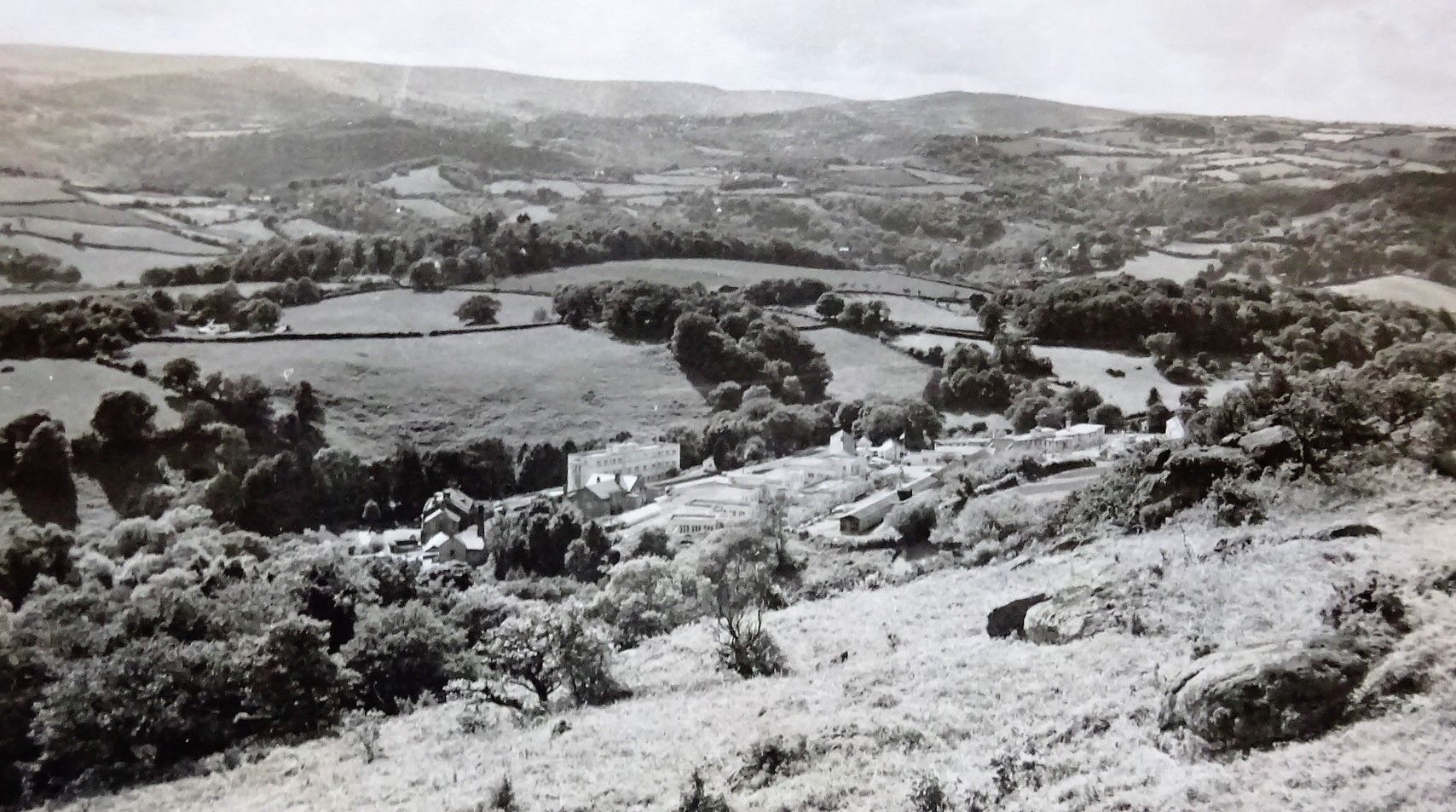
Hawkmoor Hospital viewed from the hill above

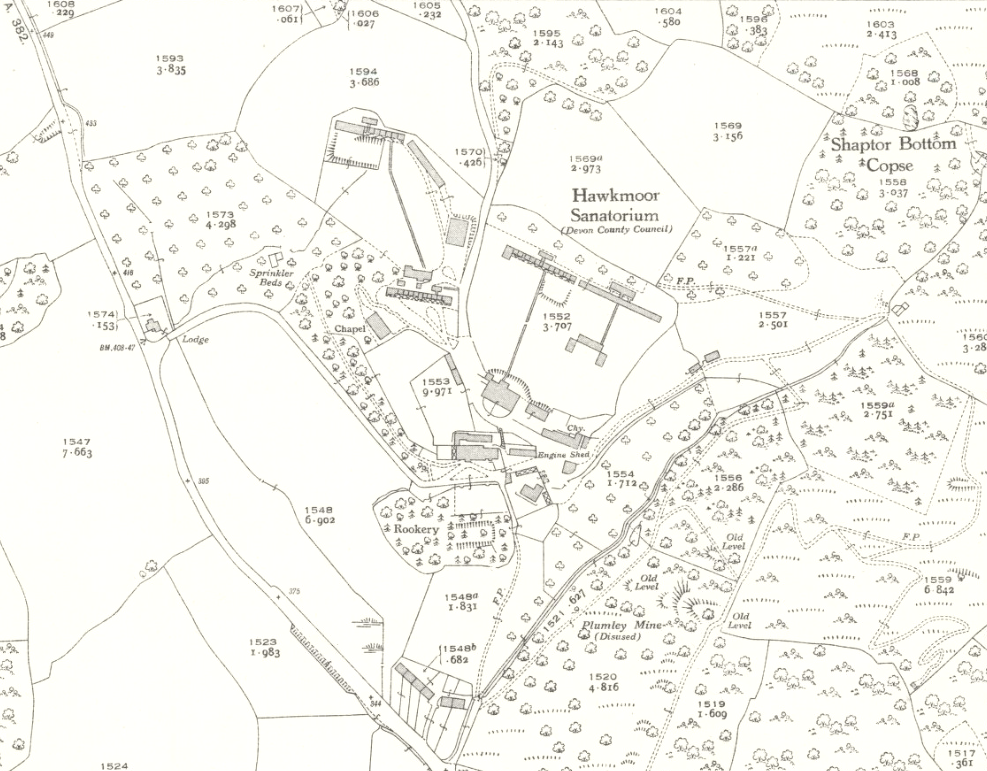
Ordnance Survey Map of 1937 of Hawkmoor Sanatorium and environs

The hospital was spread out over the hillside across a number of blocks and buildings.

The buildings included:

- the Sanatorium, built in 1913
- the Hostel, built in 1914
- the Pavilion Ward block
- a recreational hall, built in 1922
- a chapel built in 1928
- a nurses' hostel
- a further ward block
- the hospital for people with learning difficulties
- a staff canteen, built in 1949

During construction, care was taken to ensure that dampness was minimised for the respiratory patients, and specialist techniques such as waterproof cement bases were used.

The hospital had a library, with the British Red Cross providing the service for patients, and the Devon county library service providing the reference library for staff. From 1949, there was also a cinema projector to show 'talkie' films.

At some point, a 'pleasure tower' was built at the hospital, but this was in ruins by the time of a National Trust survey in 1986.

With patients often on long recuperative stays, there was a dedicated workshop where patients would make wooden gates, doors, and farm hurdles for sale.

A set of cottages, called Hawkmoor Cottages, were built as workers' housing in 1949 and 1950, at the bottom of the hill, and these are now private housing.

== Location and transport ==
The hospital site is served by a private drive linked to the A382 road between Bovey Tracey and Moretonhampstead.

From 1931 until 1959, Hawkmoor was also served by a railway station on the Moretonhampstead and South Devon Railway with a station originally called Hawkmoor Halt, but later changed to be called Pullabrook Halt. The railway station was simple with a platform constructed of sleepers and a small waiting room, and was frequently used by visitors to the hospital. Whilst only 3/4 mile directly from the station to the hospital, the distance required to be travelled was more than double that.

From 1914 to the 1950s, patients were often brought from the railways halt to the hospital by a horse-drawn vehicle from the hospital, and in the early 1950s, Devon County Council provided a motor van to move patients.

The railways was also used for transporting goods, including blood for transfusions at Hawkmoor Hospital.

With the distance from the halt, patients and visitors were often confused about how to reach the hospital, and train guards would advise passengers to alight at Bovey Tracey and take the bus, which passed the bottom of the hospital drive. This led to the name change to Pullabrook Halt.
