= Pullabrook Halt railway station =

Disused railway station in Devon, England

Coordinates: 50.6075°N 3.7078°W

Pullabrook Halt
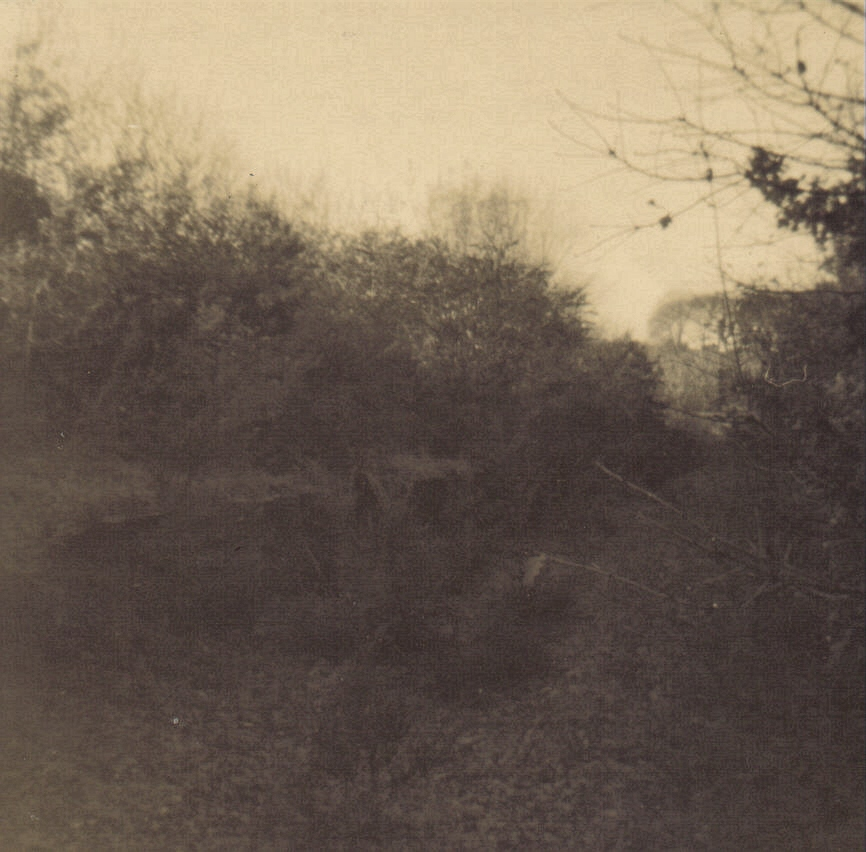
- Pullabrook Halt in 1970

General information
- Location: Pullabrook, Teignbridge; England
- Grid reference: SX792800
- Platforms: 1

Other information
- Status: Disused

History
- Post-grouping: Great Western Railway

Key dates
- 1 June 1931: Opened as Hawkmoor Halt
- 13 June 1955: Renamed Pullabrook Halt
- 2 March 1959: Closed to passengers
- 1964: Line closed to goods traffic
Location

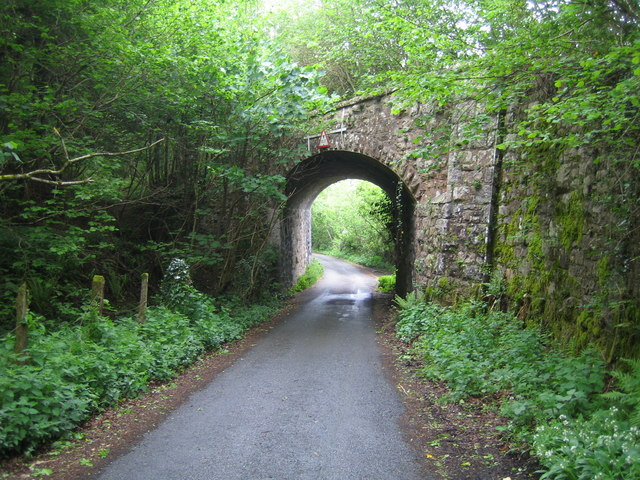
Old railway bridge near Pullabrook Halt

Pullabrook Halt was a railway station opened in 1931 by the Great Western Railway to serve the hamlet of Pullabrook that lies between Bovey Tracey and Lustleigh in West Devon, England. Opened as Hawkmoor Halt after Hawkmoor Hospital, originally known as Hawkmoor County Sanatorium, a specialist hospital founded in 1913 as a pulmonary tuberculosis sanatorium. It was renamed Pullabrook Halt by the British Railways in 1955, a few years before closure.

The halt was opened at a later date than most of the stations on the line which had itself opened in 1876. The single platform's construction was of infill behind railway sleepers. The track was single with no passing loop or sidings.

Preceding station	Disused railways	Following station
Bovey	Newton Abbot to Moretonhampstead; Great Western Railway	Lustleigh
