= Bovey Tracey Potteries =

Potteries in Devon, England

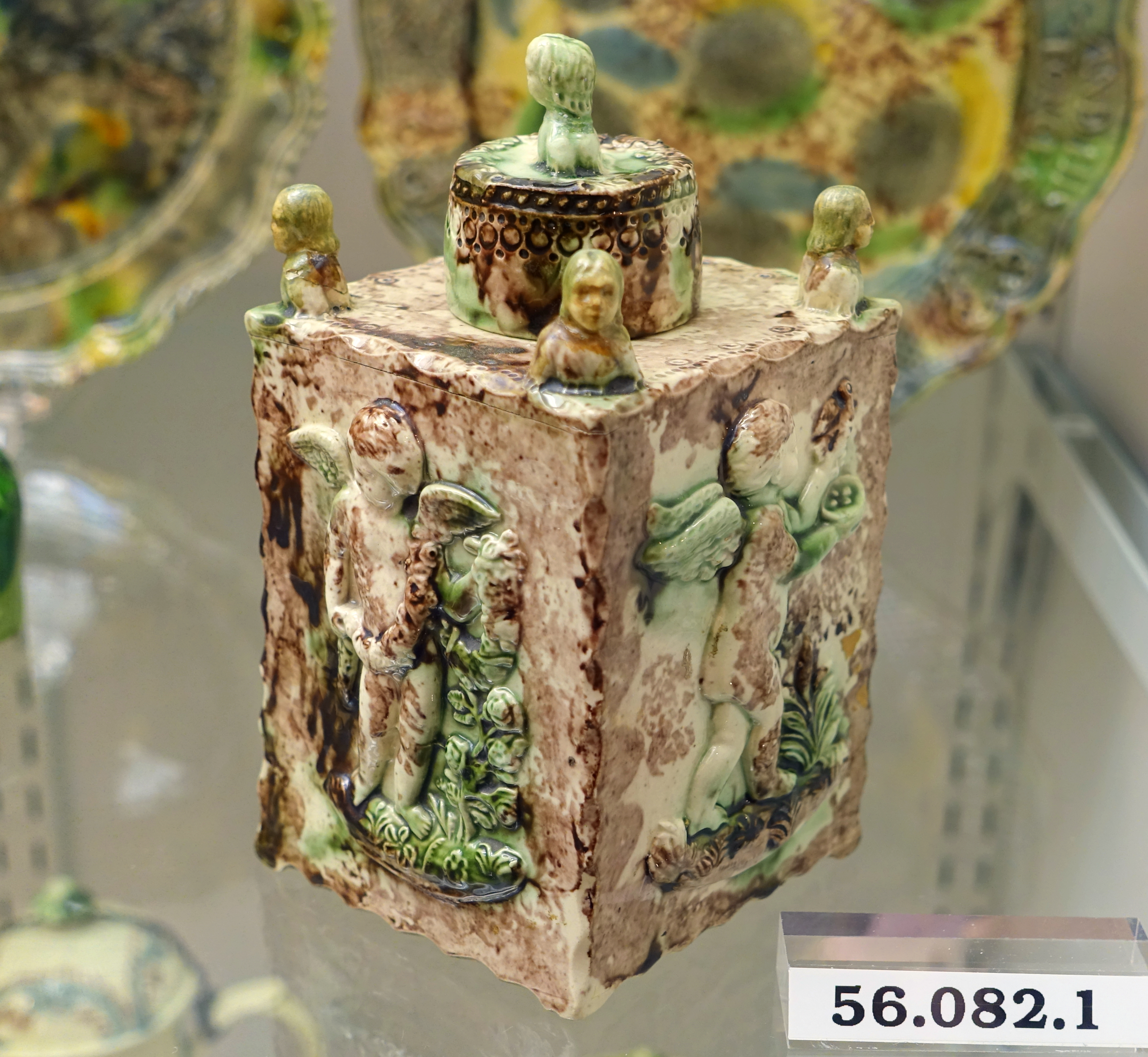
Tea canister, Bovey Tracey potteries, c. 1790, creamware with underglaze metallic oxides

The Bovey Tracey Potteries were a collection of potteries in the Bovey Tracey area of Devon, based on the clay from the Bovey Basin. Pottery making developed in the area on an industrial scale from c. 1750 and lasted for around 200 years under various owners and names.

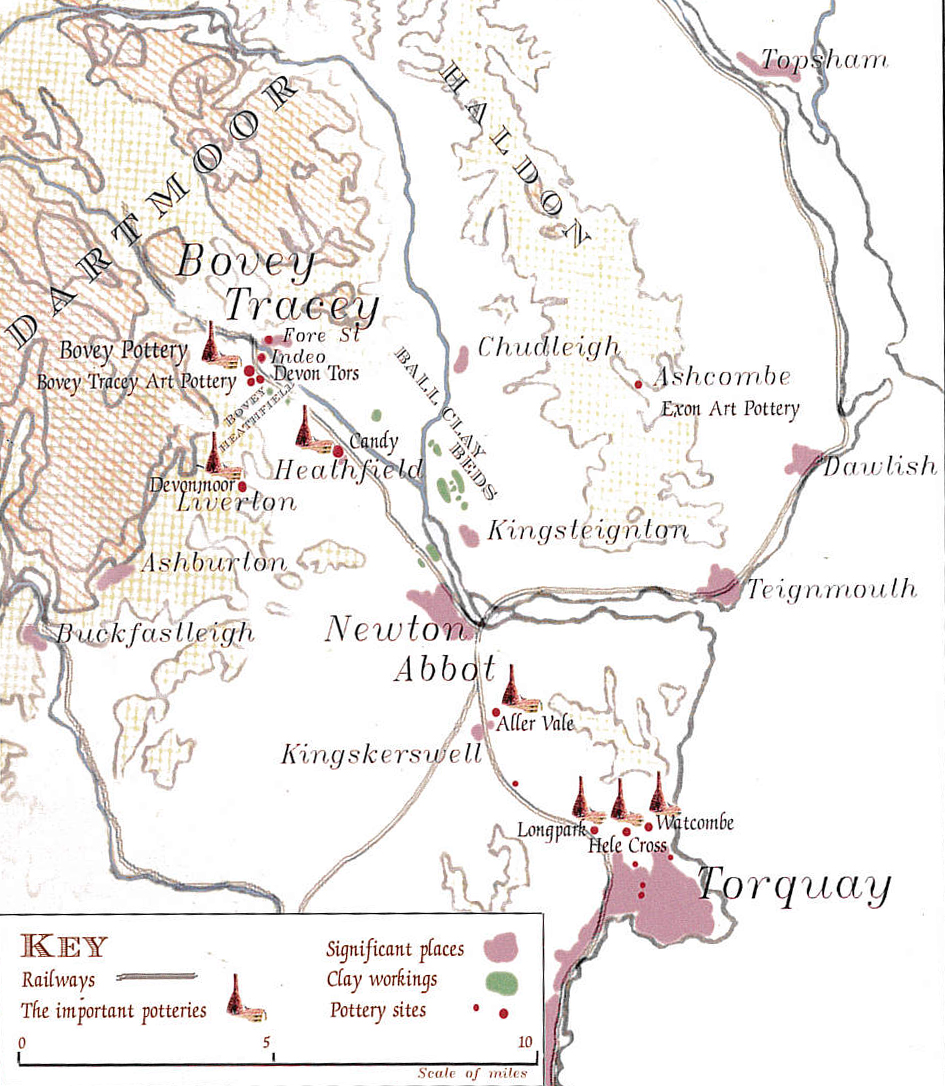
A map showing the main sites of pottery making in the area local to the "Bovey Basin".

== History ==
Pottery is known to have been produced in the area since at least the mid-18th century, as a kiln containing several unfinished and kiln-damaged salt-glazed pots dated from 1760 was discovered in 1932 in Fore Street, Bovey Tracey. The kiln has since been moved to the Bovey Tracey Heritage Centre and the pots to the Bovey Pottery Museum, where they can be seen on display.

Lord William Courtenay, Earl of Devon, opened a clay and lignite (brown coal) pit in 1750 at what has come to be known as Blue Waters near Bovey Tracey. Referred to as the "coal adventure" in the pottery industry at the time, several potters from Staffordshire moved to the area to make use of the raw materials and avoid transportation costs; but the coal was not of sufficient quality to produce the quality of pottery desired. This was documented by Jeremiah Milles, Dean of Exeter, who said: "the Bovey coal… was not of a heat intense enough to answer the purpose".

== Known potteries ==
The best-known potteries at Bovey Tracey included The Indeo Pottery, The Folly Pottery, The Bovey Tracey Pottery Company and The Bovey Pottery Company Limited, covering a period from 1766 to 1999.

=== The Indeo Pottery (1766–1836) ===
In 1766 Nicholas Crisp, a London businessman, moved to Bovey Heathfield (the town which would later come to be known as Bovey Tracey), bringing with him the backing of other investors and several key workers. He established a new company for the manufacture of porcelain and pottery at Indeo House. Indeo Pottery was well known for its Saltglaze, Creamware and Pearlware Tea Canisters inscribed with owners' names, but within two years the company was declared bankrupt.

In 1772 William Ellis, a local potter, raised enough funds to re-establish the Indeo Pottery. The company lasted under various partnerships until 1836.

Josiah Wedgwood visited The Indeo Pottery on 31 May 1775, commenting "it is a poor trifling concern, and conducted in a wretched slovenly manner. We carry their clay and flints from Devonshire into Staffordshire, there manufacture them into ware, and send it back to their own doors better and cheaper than they can make it!".

=== The Folly Pottery (1801–1836) ===
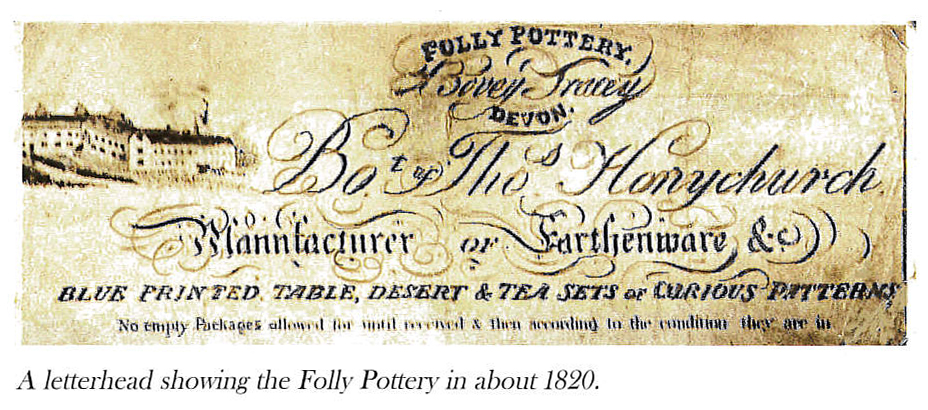
Proof that "The Folly Pottery" name was eventually adopted by the company and used in official documentation, as seen here on the company's letterhead from around 1820.

In 1801 a new pottery was built in Bovey as a direct competitor to the nearby Indeo Pottery. This new company underwent several changes, until 1820 when it became popularly known as "The Folly Pottery" due to "the failure of different particulars". This name was eventually adopted and used in official documentation. The Honeychurch family, who had taken over the business in 1805, continued to run it until 1836 when business declined.

The Folly Pottery was one of the largest potteries in the west of England, employing at one stage up to 50 people across various pottery-making trades all undertaken at the same site, unlike most other potteries of the time.

=== The Bovey Tracey Pottery Company (1843–1894) ===
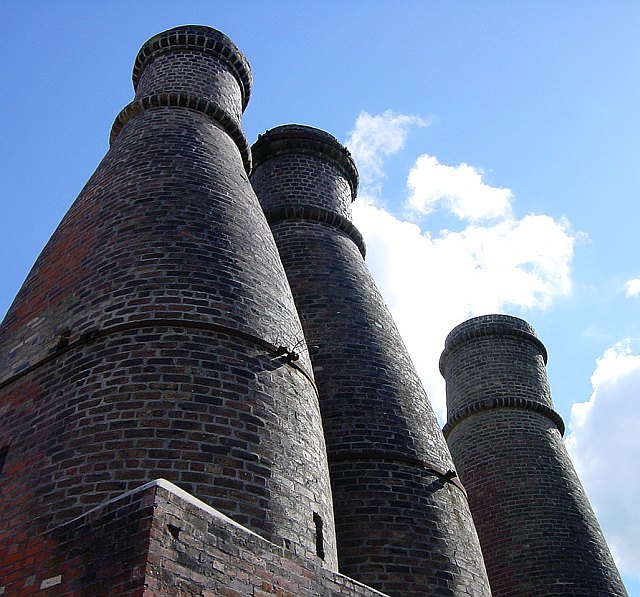
Bottle kilns at "The Old Pottery" Bovey Tracey, 2005

In 1827, the Indeo Pottery and Folly Pottery were "in a state of insolvency due to bad management." In 1835, the Honeychurch family were declared bankrupt; the premises were saved from a state of dereliction and the pottery revived in 1843 by Buller, Divett and Company. Their landlord, the Earl of Devon, rented it under the condition that "not less than £400" be spent on erecting new buildings and a kiln. By 1851, there were 300 employees, who were said to be producing "earthenware equal in quality and design to the best Staffordshire wares." The pottery was well-known for mess ware commissioned for use on naval ships, as well as presentation mugs and clotted cream jars.

The pottery continued to run successfully until 1885, when it was taken over by new management and saw a steady decline until worker strikes led to its eventual closure in 1894.

=== The Bovey Pottery Company Limited (1894–1957 and 1994–1999) ===
Following the closure of The Bovey Pottery Company, a creditor intervened to ensure the pottery was incorporated under the directorship of Bristol-based pottery, T.B Johnson.

==== Wemyss Ware ====
The production of Wemyss Ware moved to The Bovey Tracey Pottery Company Limited with Joseph Nekola (son of original decorator Karel Nekola) in 1930 following the closure of the original Fife pottery during the Great Depression. Nekola trained several apprentices at The Bovey Tracey Potteries during his term, including Esther Weeks (née Clark) who took over as head decorator after his death in 1952. The production of Wemyss Ware ended at this site in 1957 after protracted workforce strikes forced closure.

==== Plichta ====
In 1939 Jan Plichta, an exporter and wholesaler of china and pottery, began to purchase goods from The Bovey Tracey Pottery with his own "Plichta" stamp. Some but not all of the items produced under the Plichta stamp at The Bovey Tracey Potteries were made by Wemyss Ware decorators, leading to confusion over identification of pottery in subsequent years. The exporting of goods abroad was one of the few ways for the country to raise much needed revenue for Britain during World War II, as production of decorative ware was otherwise prohibited during the wartime era, except for the purpose of export.

The company's fortunes declined over the years for several reasons, including the depression, loss of workers to the war effort and union strikes, and closed in 1957. The pottery was best known for Commemorative cups, Dartmoor Ware and a collection of porcelain figurines called 'Our Gang', including representations of Winston Churchill, Theodore Roosevelt and Joseph Stalin.

Pottery making was briefly resurrected under The Bovey Pottery Company Limited in 1994 by House of Marbles, who occupy the site in the present day. New products were in the style of 1930s Dartmoor Ware but the venture only lasted for six years until 1999 when it was decided to focus on the other more profitable industries of games and glass.

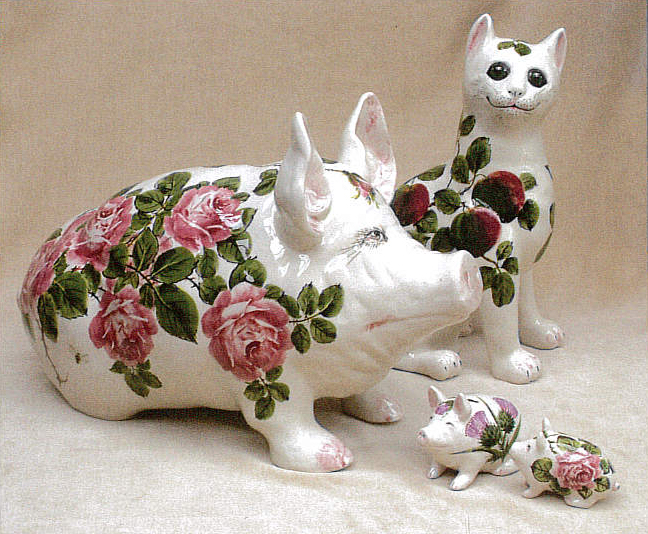
Wemyss Ware produced at The Bovey Pottery Company Limited in Bovey Tracey.

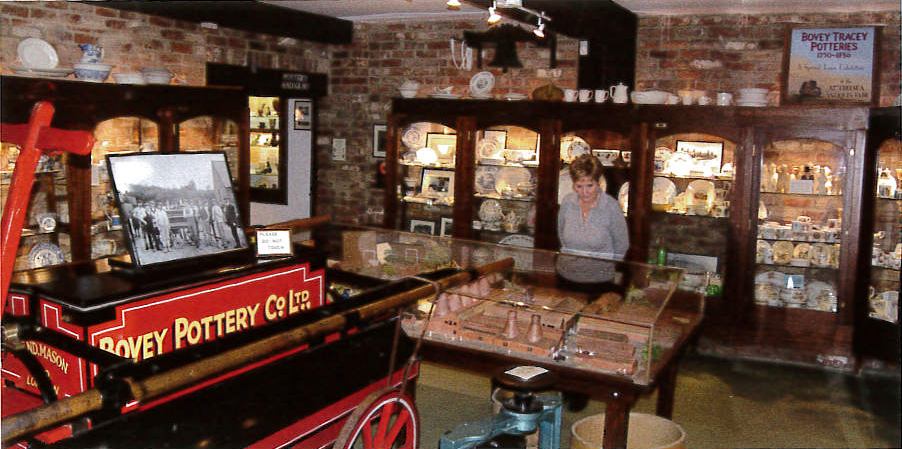
The Bovey Tracey Pottery Museum at House of Marbles, Devon

== Bovey Tracey railway station ==
Bovey Railway Station was built in the 1860s as part of the Exeter to Plymouth line, branching off through Moretonhampstead. It is thought that the train station was brought to the town due to investment by The Bovey Tracey Pottery Company, but in any case the pottery certainly used the line in order to easily transport its wares to other areas of the country, as evidenced by the siding at the site.

== Present day ==
The buildings of the former potteries based on Pottery Road were acquired by a company called House of Marbles in 1990 for the manufacture and distribution of games and glassware. The company houses The Bovey Pottery Museum, with many items produced at the Bovey Potteries on display. There are also three muffle kilns on the site that are protected as scheduled monuments. This is one of just two sites left in the UK where muffle kilns (also referred to as enamel kilns) can be found; the other site is at Gladstone Pottery Museum in Stoke-on-Trent.

== Sources ==
- Adams, Brian (2005). Bovey Tracey Potteries: Guide and Marks. Bovey Tracey: House Of Marbles. ISBN 978-0954974404.
- Adams, Brian; Thomas, Anthony (1996). A Potwork in Devonshire: The History and Products of the Bovey Tracey Potteries 1750-1836. Bovey Tracey: Sayce Publishing. ISBN 978-0952739203.
