= A382 road =

Road in Devon, England

A382

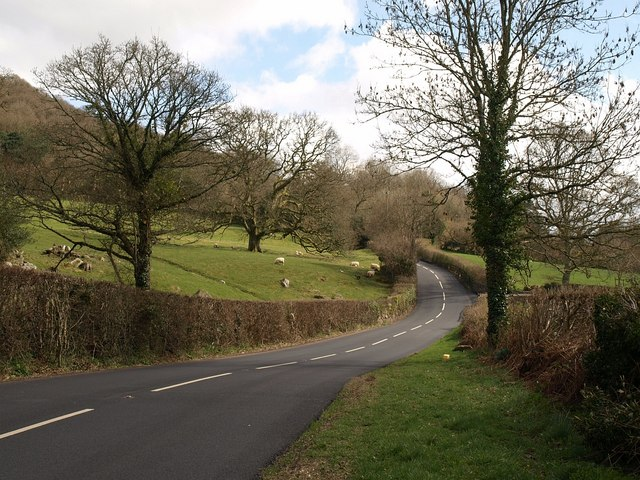

Route information
- Length: 19.1 mi (30.7 km)

Major junctions
- South end: Newton Abbot; 50.52872°N 3.615105°W
- A381 A383; A38 A3124 A30
- North end: Whiddon Down; 50.720333°N 3.84745°W

Location
- Country: United Kingdom
- Constituent country: England
- Primary destinations: Newton Abbot, Bovey Tracey, Lustleigh, Moretonhampstead

Road network
- Roads in the United Kingdom; Motorways; A and B road zones

The A382 is a road in South West England, connecting Newton Abbot to the A38, then to Bovey Tracey and on through Moretonhampstead to the A30.

== Route ==
The road starts in Newton Abbot at the junction with the A381, continuing out through the town, past the connection to the A383 which links to the A38 southbound.

It continues past Stover School, Stover Country Park and the Newton Abbot branch of Trago Mills before arriving at the junction with the A38, known as Drumbridges. From the A38 roundabout, the road continues in a straight line for 2 km, known locally as the "Bovey Straight" across Bovey Heath, with Heathfield on the east and Great Plantation on the west towards Bovey Tracey.

The road used to go through the centre of Bovey Tracey, but since 1987 it has bypassed the town, following part of the route of the old Moretonhampstead and South Devon Railway line, from where that line crossed the road near the former Bovey Tracey Pottery to just north of the junction with the B3387 road to Widecombe-in-the-Moor and Haytor. The former Bovey railway station was retained at the side of the road and is now a heritage centre.

The bypass continues on a northerly route west of the town until it joins the former turnpike road which follows the hillside to Lustleigh, and thereafter the valley of the Wray Brook. It passes the former Hawkmoor County Sanatorium and the village of Lustleigh before arriving in the town of Moretonhampstead where the B3212 heads towards Postbridge and Princetown in one direction and towards Exeter in the other.

From here, the A382 continues north-west, through the small settlements of Easton and Sandy Park, eventually arriving at Whiddon Down, where there is a bypass around the village, before the road joins up with the A30 road. The A30 junction was previously a roundabout, known as the Merrymeet junction, but was replaced in 2006 by a split-level junction allowing the A30 dual carriageway to run unimpeded by traffic from the A382, in what had been a major cause of congestion. The new junction opened in December 2006.

== History ==
=== Turnpike ===
The road mainly follows the route of the road built by the Newton Bushell Turnpike Trust, one of a number of turnpike trusts operating in Devon, who upgraded, built, and maintained a number of trunk roads, which were often poorly served by the parish councils who were responsible for road maintenance but often prioritised roads within the parish rather than those between parishes.

The trust was given the requisite Act of Parliament following a "petition of the Gentlemen, Clergy, and Freeholders of the several Parishes of Teingrafe, Bovey Tracey, Lustley, North Bovey, and Moreton Hampstead" on 19 January 1761, due their road being "incommodious, having a very troublesome ascent and descent, that has scarcely ever been considered a public road". This caused the building of the turnpike road from Newton Bushell (now Newton Abbot) to Moretonhampstead. At Moretonhampstead, it met with the road of the Moretonhampstead Turnpike Trust which ran from Cherrybrook on Dartmoor to Dunsford (now the B3212) where it joined the Exeter turnpike.

In 1826, a further Act was made to both repair and improve the road from Newton to Moretonhampstead, as well as extend it to Whiddon Down through the village of Sandy Park, where it would join with the turnpike of the Okehampton Turnpike Trust.

The turnpike trust had eight tollhouses along the route (as well as three on their branch to Ashburton, now the A383), of which three remain standing. These were at:

- Forches Cross, Newton Abbot (demolished 2009)
- Claybere, Newton Abbot
- Bovey Tracey (still standing)
- Bradleyford, Bovey Tracey
- King's Bridge, Moretonhampstead (still standing)
- Northern gate, Moretonhampstead
- Whiddon Down (still standing)
- Whiddon North - towards North Tawton and Okehampton turnpike (still standing)
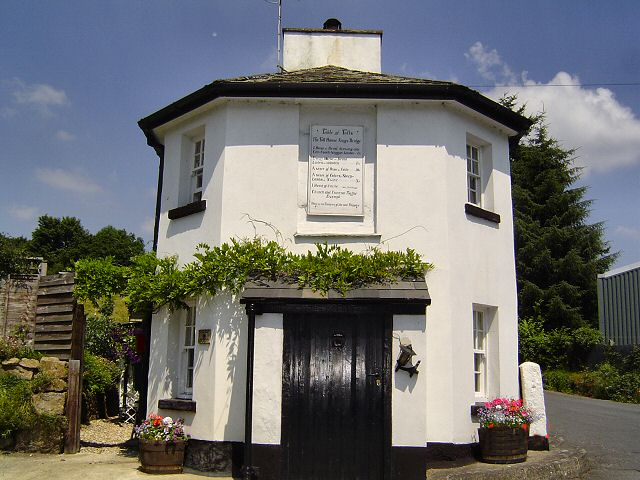
Tollhouse at Moretonhampstead

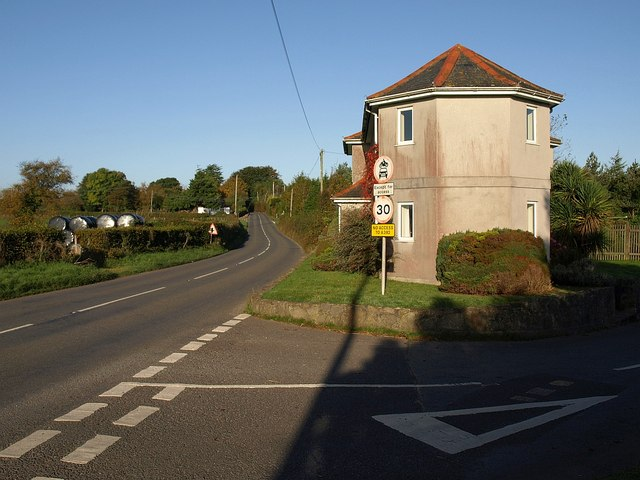
Tollhouse at Whiddon Down

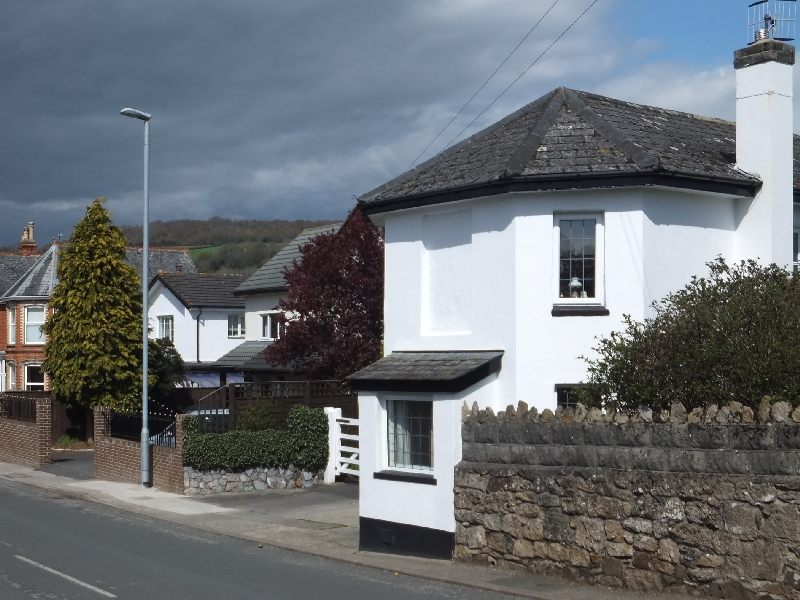
Tollhouse at Bovey Tracey

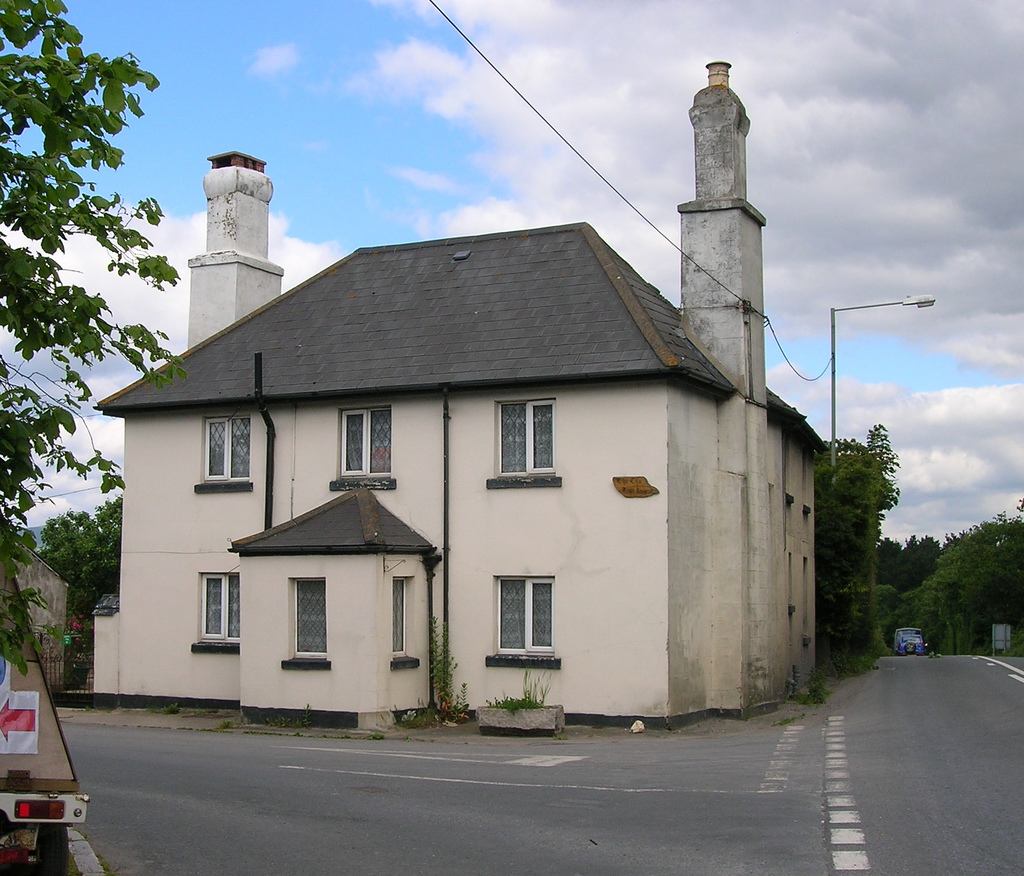
Tollhouse at Forches Cross, demolished in 2009

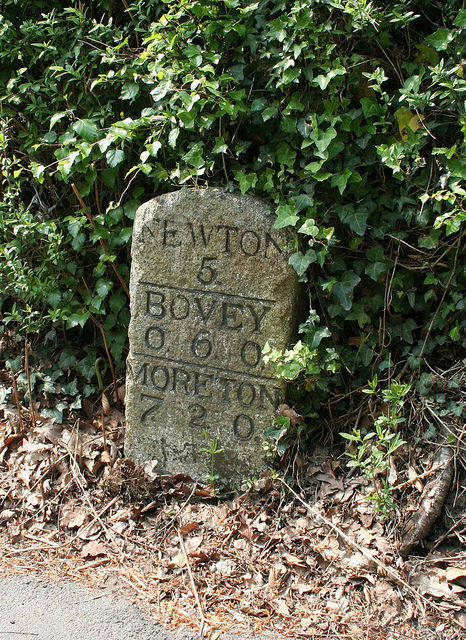
Newton detail granite milestone at Bovey Tracey

The tollhouse at Forches Cross was demolished in 2009, despite the recommendation of the planning officer to refuse permission, as part of a deal by the adjacent garden centre to improve the dangerous junction.

The turnpike trust had distinctive "Newton detail" milestones on the road between Newton and Moretonhampstead, although due to their non-completion of all of the agreed works from Moreton to Whiddon Down, there are none on that stretch. Fourteen of these original 26 milestones still remain, marked with destinations and a distance in miles, furlongs, and poles, and they are listed at Grade II.

=== Bovey bypass ===
Bypassing the town of Bovey Tracey was suggested in the 1930s by the owner of Parke, with a proposed route from the Dolphin Hotel North to the road near Dean Parke.

The scheme was once again revived in the 1960s, with a proposed building date of 1971–1981.

In the 1980s, a £3m scheme was proposed and this led to a public inquiry due to disagreement over the route, despite being supported by council planners. The bypass was finally approved in 1986 to largely follow the disused line of the Moretonhampstead and South Devon Railway.

Construction had a number of unexpected elements, including the requirement for special tunnels to be installed under the road for the use of badgers, and the discovery of granite milepost, which was re-erected close to the new road.

The construction necessitated the demolition of a twin-arch road bridge near the Bovey Pottery (now the House of Marbles), despite a campaign to save the bridge by local campaigners. It also meant the 11-month closure of the road to Ashburton as the original rail bridge was demolished and replaced.

The new bypass finally opened in October 1987, being accompanied by a celebratory fete titled "Bypass '87", which raised money for charity, prior to its official opening a few days later by the county council chairman.

The total final cost of the bypass was £2.25m, (equivalent to over £6m in 2023) and attracted some early criticism as being a "white elephant".

=== 21st century upgrades ===
In 2021 an upgrade of the section of road between Forches Cross and Whitehill Cross was made, costing £5.1m

In 2024 construction started on the construction of a link road from Forches Cross to Newton Abbot Community Hospital, called the Jetty Marsh Link, as well as improvements from Forches Cross to Drumbridges, anticipated to cost over £38m. This will also involve connecting to a new link road running from near Forches Cross down to join the A383. This link road is claimed to be the UK's first carbon negative road project, with efforts including the relocation of around 2,000 trees and provision of a temporary nursery for them to be replanted.

The 2024 improvement will see the A382's first section of dual carriageway installed between the A38 and the Trago Mills roundabout, with widening all the way to Forches Cross. The widening has involved the compulsory purchase of land in use as part of Stover Golf Course, and this necessitated the replacement of four holes of the course through expansion of the club. The scheme requires new roundabouts and will be designed to also improve walking and cycling routes. There will also be the provision of a link road from one of the new roundabouts to the A383 road through the Houghton Barton development.

== Accidents and deaths ==
The A382 saw five fatal accidents between 1999 and 2010, two resulting in the death of a car driver, and three in the death of a motorcyclist. The road carries warning signs specifically related to motorcycle accidents, indicating 13 accidents over 3 years between Bovey Tracey and Moretonhampstead.

In the period 2018–2022, there was one fatal collision on the stretch of the road between Drumbridges and Bovey Tracey (as well as 10 accidents with injuries) and another between Easton and Whiddon Down (with 10 injury accidents), whilst the Bovey to Moreton section had 12 injuries, 11 injuries between Drumbridges and Forches Cross, 16 injuries between Forches Cross and Newton Abbot, and 3 injuries between Moreton and Easton.
