= Kirkcaldy Galleries =

Museum and library in Kirkcaldy, Scotland

Coordinates: 56.1123°N 3.1660°W

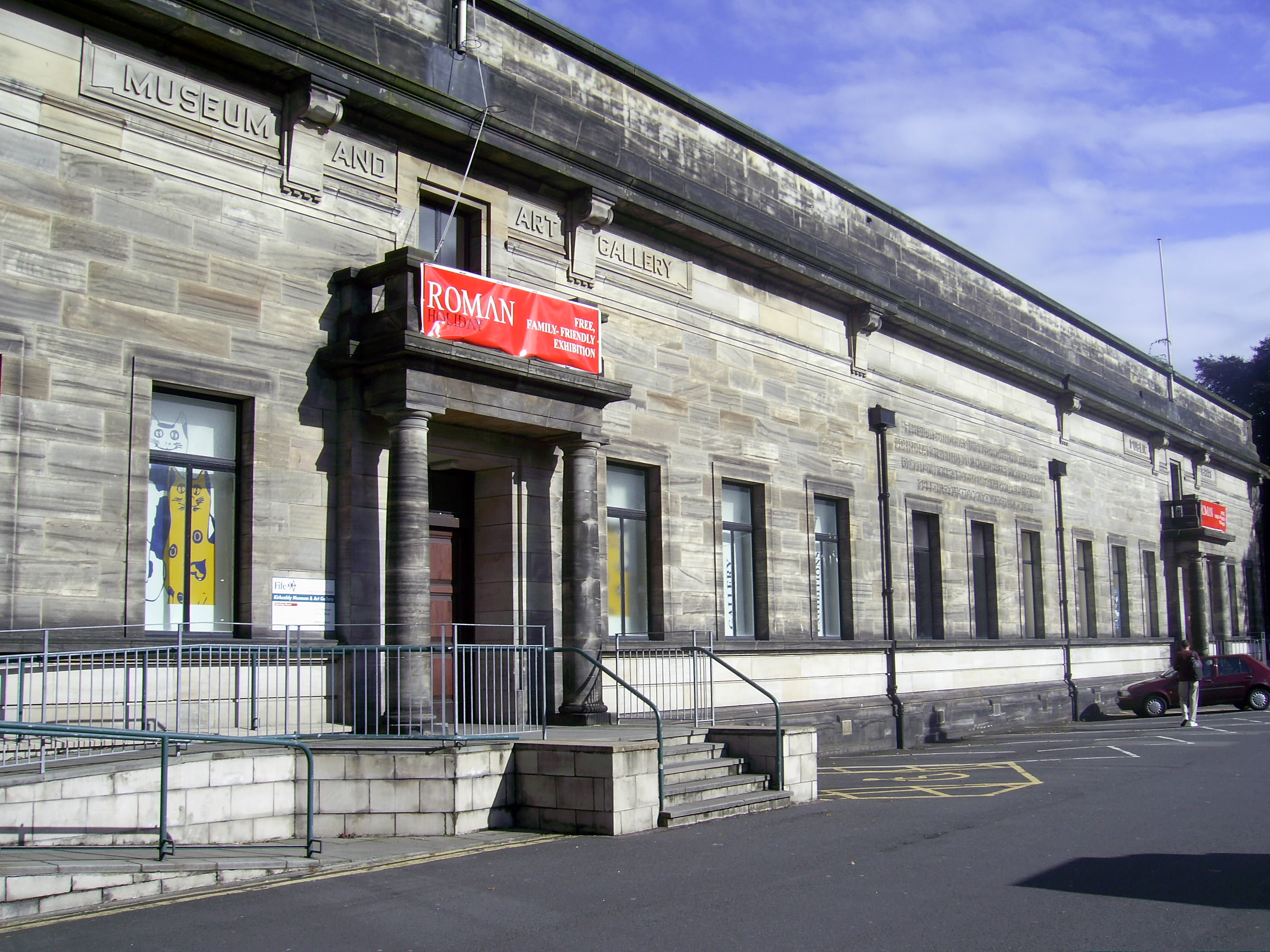
Kirkcaldy Galleries

Kirkcaldy Galleries is the main museum, library and exhibition space in Kirkcaldy in Fife, Scotland.

== History ==
The land for the town's museum and art gallery was donated by John Nairn (the grandson of the linoleum manufacturer, Michael Nairn) on the former site of Balsusney House, the home of John Maxton. This was opened in 1925, with the first chairman of trustees local cloth-manufacturer businessman John Blyth, the maternal grandfather of politician Michael Portillo.

In 2012 Fife Council undertook a £2.5m refurbishment of the building, which reopened in June 2013. It now contains a museum, library, children's library, PC suite, cafe, gift shop, meeting rooms, museum, local family and history rooms and gallery spaces.

The Galleries opening was attended by local author Val McDermid, Wolf from Gladiators, MP and former Prime Minister Gordon Brown and artist Jack Vettriano.

== Collections ==
The art gallery holds the largest collection of paintings by William McTaggart and Scottish Colourist Samuel Peploe aside from the National Galleries of Scotland. The museum contains many significant works by the Glasgow Boys. Situated on the ground floor, is the museum's award-winning permanent exhibition covering the town's industrial heritage. The museum also has a cafe which displays examples of Wemyss Ware pottery, made in the town from around the 1890s to 1930s.

In 2015, Kirkcaldy Galleries became the first institution in Fife to display work by American photographer Diane Arbus.

The Great Tapestry of Scotland was displayed at the Galleries in 2015 where the Rosslyn Chapel panel, one of 160 panels, was stolen. It was not recovered and a replacement panel was completed in 2017.
