= The Song You Gave Me =

1933 film

- American poster
- Directed by: Paul L. Stein
- Written by: Walter Reisch (play Das Lied ist aus); Clifford Grey
- Produced by: John Maxwell
- Starring: Bebe Daniels; Victor Varconi; Frederick Lloyd
- Cinematography: Claude Friese-Greene
- Edited by: L.A. Appelbaum
- Music by: Kurt Schröder
- Production company: British International Pictures
- Distributed by: Wardour Films
- Release date: July 1933
- Running time: 86 minutes
- Country: United Kingdom
- Language: English

The Song You Gave Me is a 1933 British musical film directed by Paul L. Stein, and starring Bebe Daniels, Victor Varconi, and Frederick Lloyd. It was made at Elstree Studios. The film's sets were designed by the art director John Mead. It was distributed in America by Columbia Pictures. It was based on a play by Walter Reisch which had previously been adapted into the 1930 German film The Song Is Ended.

== Cast ==
- Bebe Daniels as Mitzi Hansen
- Victor Varconi as Karl Linden
- Frederick Lloyd as Baron Bobo
- Claude Hulbert as Tony Brandt
- Lester Matthews as Max Winter
- Iris Ashley as Emmy
- Eva Moore as grandmother
- Stewart Granger as waiter
- Victor Rietti as nightclub manager
- Walter Widdop as singer

== See also ==
- The Song Is Ended (1930)

== Bibliography ==
- Low, Rachael. Filmmaking in 1930s Britain. George Allen & Unwin, 1985.
