= Bovey Tracey Town Hall =

Municipal building in Bovey Tracey, Devon, England

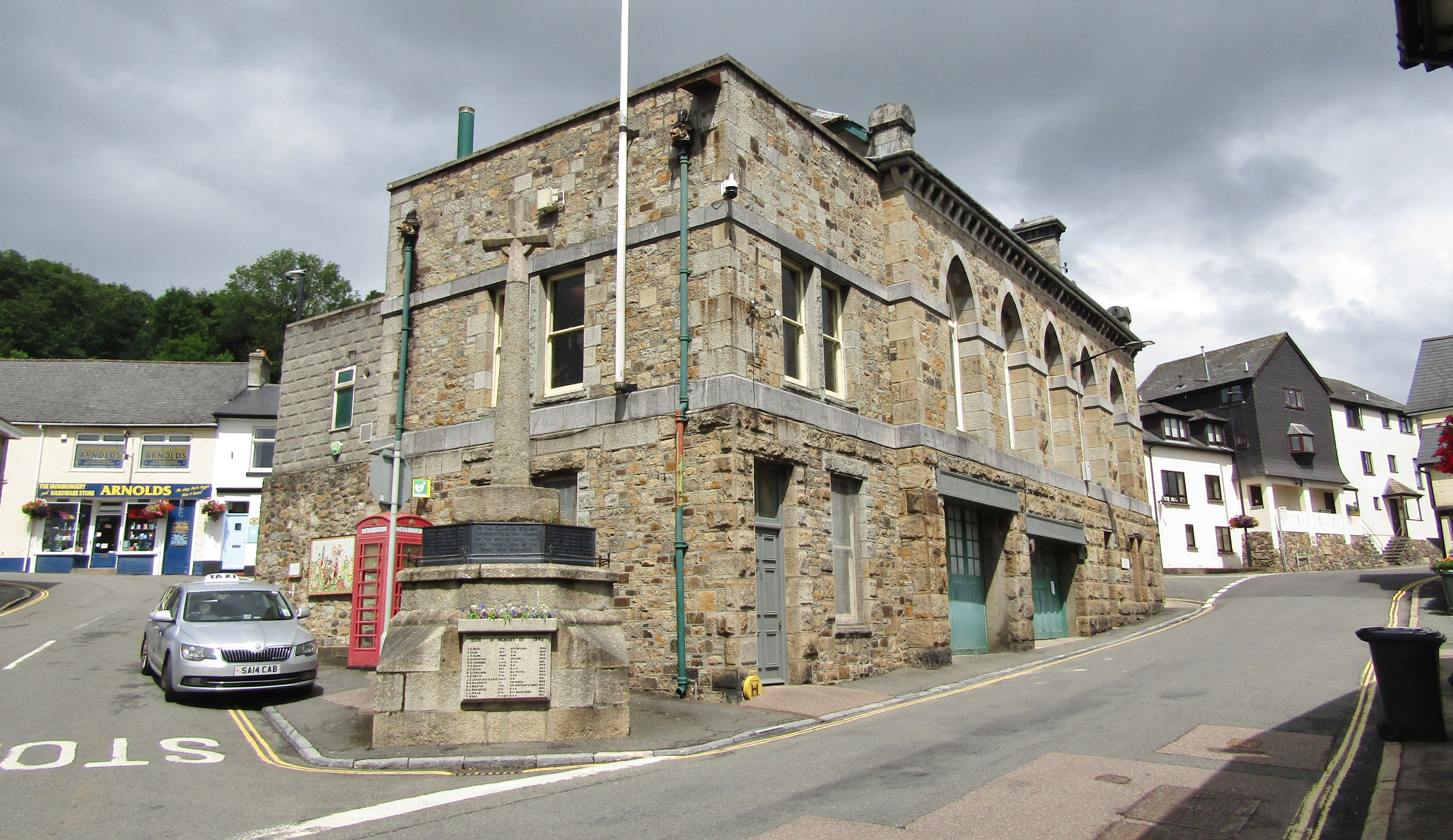
- Bovey Tracey Town Hall

- Shown in Devon
- 50.5949°N 3.6725°W
- Location: Town Hall Place, Bovey Tracey

History
- Built: 1866

Site notes
- Architectural style: Italianate style

Listed Building – Grade II
- Official name: Town Hall, Town Hall Place
- Designated: 3 July 1986
- Reference no.: 1165878

Bovey Tracey Town Hall is a municipal building in Town Hall Place, Bovey Tracey, Devon, England. The town hall, which is the meeting place of Bovey Tracey Town Council, is a Grade II listed building.

== History ==
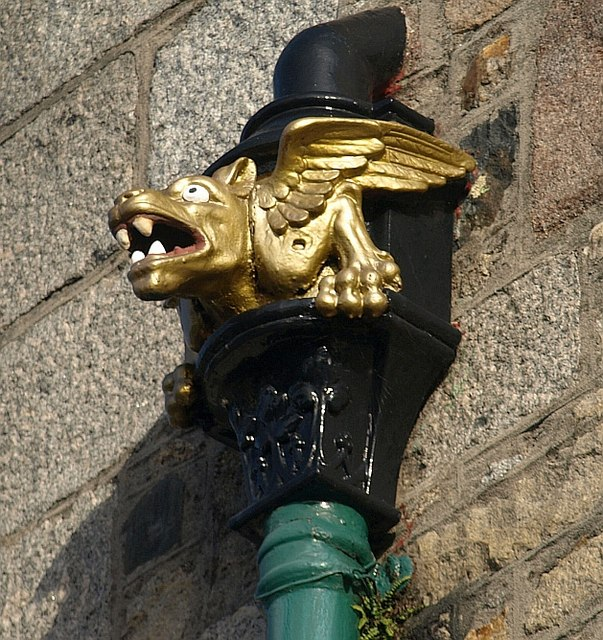
One of the two gargoyles on the building

The site occupied by the current building previously formed part of Bovey Tracy Village Green: two cottages were demolished and the local market cross was relocated to the southwest corner of the site to make way for the new development. The new building was designed in the Italianate style, built in rubble masonry at a cost of £1,000 and was completed in 1866.

The original design involved a symmetrical main frontage with five bays facing onto Town Hall Place; the ground floor was rusticated and provided openings for the local horse-drawn fire engine, while the first floor featured a row of five pointed windows forming a piano nobile. At roof level, there was a prominent modillioned cornice. Extensions were added on the side and rear elevations at a later date. At the northeast and southwest corners of the building brightly painted gargoyles were fitted as heads to the iron rainwater pipes. Internally, the principal room was the main hall on the first floor which was used for civic meetings, balls and concerts.

On account of the relatively small population of the town, the borough council, which had met in the town hall, was abolished under the Municipal Corporations Act 1883. A local parish council, which was formed in 1896, established its offices in the building and used it as its main meeting place. In the early 1920s, the market cross was adapted to form the centrepiece of a memorial to commemorate the lives of local service personnel who had died in the First World War.

Following local government re-organisation in 1974, the local parish council became known as Bovey Tracey Town Council. In October 2020, the town council established a new community hub in Station Road, known as the Riverside Community Centre: the centre became the home of the local library, an information centre, a space for growing businesses and a local meeting place: the town council staff subsequently vacated the town hall and also relocated to the new centre.
