= Frederick Lloyd (actor) =

British actor (1880–1949)

- Born: Frederick William Lloyd; 15 January 1880; London, England
- Died: 24 November 1949 (aged 69); Hove, Sussex, England
- Occupation: Actor
- Spouses: Auriol Lee (m. 1911–1922); Yvette Plancon (m. 1925–1929)

Frederick Lloyd (15 January 1880 – 24 November 1949) was a British film and stage actor. His most notable appearances include Doctor Watson in the 1932 film The Hound of the Baskervilles and Mr. Grimwig in David Lean's 1948 literature adaption Oliver Twist.

== Biography ==
He was born Frederick William Lloyd in London on 15 January 1880. His parents were the Reverend Frederick Charles Lloyd and his wife Mary Florence, née Cox. Lloyd was married to theatre actress Auriol Lee from 1911 to 1922. He was later married to actress Yvette Plancon from 1925 to 1929. He died on 24 November 1949 at Hove, Sussex, England.

In an obituary in The Times John Gielgud wrote that 'the theatre has suffered a real loss in the death of Frederick Lloyd', adding 'his enthusiasm and charming joviality and his generous attitude toward the young actor-director — for I was a young man when I met him first — is something I shall remember with great affection and gratitude'.

== Selected filmography ==
- The W Plan (1930)
- Tell England (1931)
- The Perfect Lady (1931)
- The Beggar Student (1931)
- A Gentleman of Paris (1931)
- The Great Gay Road (1931)
- Sleepless Nights (1932)
- The Hound of the Baskervilles (1932) Dr. Watson
- The Song You Gave Me (1933)
- Up for the Derby (1933)
- Mixed Doubles (1933)
- Royal Cavalcade (1935)
- Radio Pirates (1935)
- Everything Is Thunder (1936) Muller
- Under Secret Orders (1937) Col. Marchand
- Oh, Mr Porter! (1937) Minister
- Secret Lives (1937)
- Weddings Are Wonderful (1938)
- Oliver Twist (1948) Mr. Grimwig
