= Bovey railway station =

Disused railway station in Devon, England

Coordinates: 50.59228°N 3.68114°W

Bovey
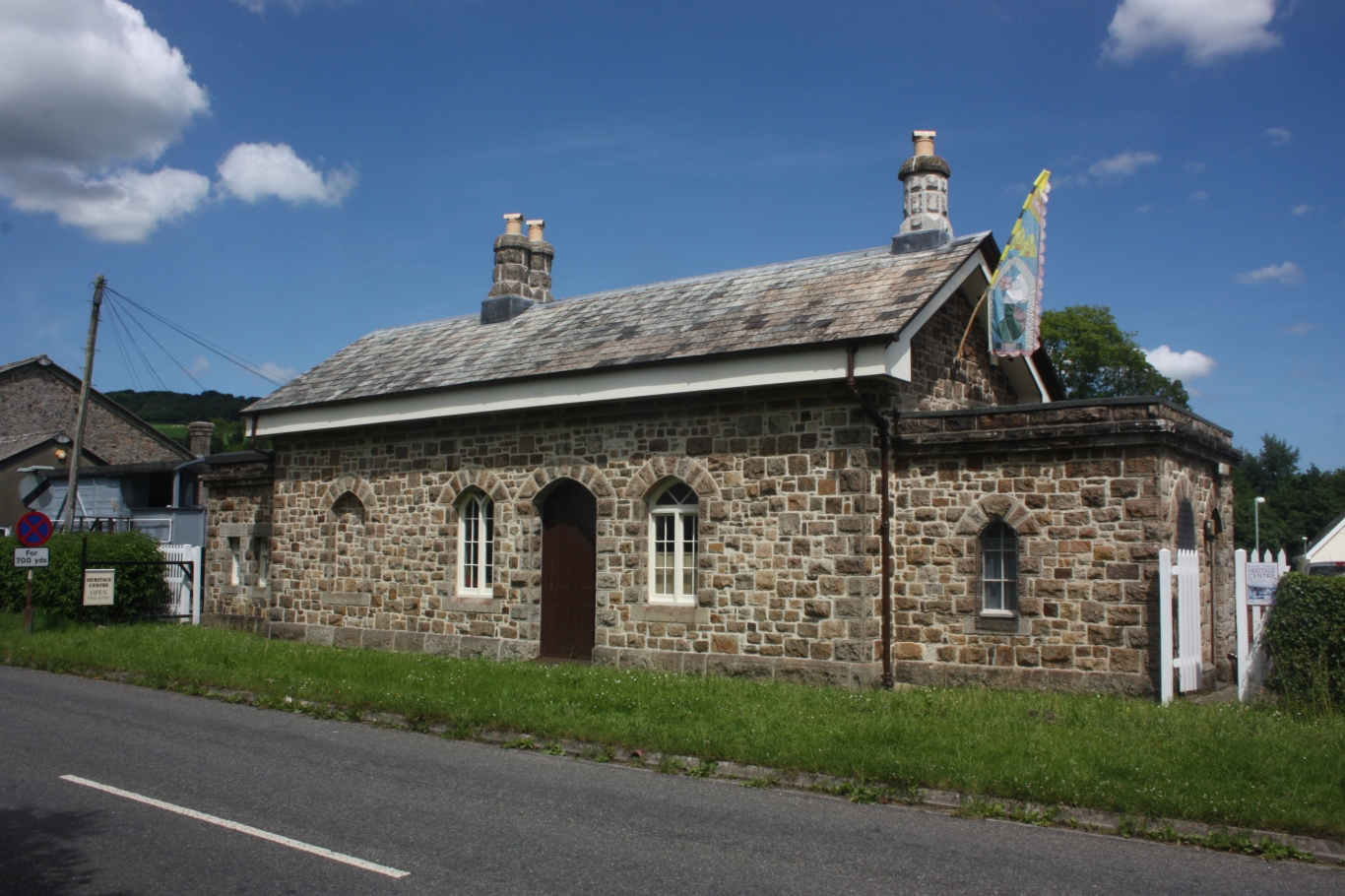
- Bovey station in 2017

General information
- Location: Bovey Tracey, Teignbridge; England
- Platforms: 2

Other information
- Status: Disused

History
- Post-grouping: Great Western Railway

Key dates
- 4 July 1866: Opened
- 2 March 1959: Closed to passengers
- 6 July 1970: Line closed to goods traffic
Location

Bovey railway station, sometimes known as Bovey for Ilsington, was a stop on the Moretonhampstead and South Devon Railway at Bovey Tracey, Devon, England.

== History ==
The station was built on the west side of the town, opening on 4 July 1866. Two platforms were provided, with the main building and goods shed being on the town side of the line.

The station closed to passengers after the last train on 28 February 1959, with goods trains continuing until 6 July 1970.

Preceding station	Disused railways	Following station
Brimley Halt	Newton Abbot to Moretonhampstead; Great Western Railway	Pullabrook Halt

== The site today ==
Some of the line is now a road by-pass carrying the A382 road; a short distance to the north, the road diverges where the line is now a woodland walk through the Parke estate, owned by the National Trust, along the old track bed to Lustleigh station.

The station building still stands adjacent to the by-pass and is used as the Bovey Tracey Heritage Trust Centre. The goods shed is used as a store by the Dartmoor National Park Authority.
