= The Song Is Ended =

1930 film directed by Géza von Bolváry

- Film poster
- German: Das Lied ist aus
- Directed by: Géza von Bolváry
- Written by: Walter Reisch
- Produced by: Julius Haimann
- Starring: Liane Haid; Willi Forst; Margarete Schlegel
- Cinematography: Willy Goldberger
- Edited by: Andrew Marton
- Music by: Robert Stolz
- Production company: Super-Film
- Distributed by: Super-Film
- Release date: 7 October 1930
- Running time: 102 minutes
- Country: Germany
- Language: German

The Song Is Ended (German: Das Lied ist aus) is a 1930 German romantic musical film directed by Géza von Bolváry, and starring Liane Haid, Willi Forst, and Margarete Schlegel. A separate French-language version Petit officier... Adieu! was also produced. It was shot at the Tempelhof Studios in Berlin. The film's sets were designed by the art directors Robert Neppach and Erwin Scharf.

== Synopsis ==
Tilla Morland is a major operetta star. Celebrating with friends at a fancy restaurant, she is asked to sing the hit song from her new triumph. To her outrage one of the customers gets up and leaves during her performance. A few days later the same man, an ex-army officer, turns up as her new private secretary. The two gradually warm to each other during their work, and fall in love. Each is unable to tell the other about their true feelings.

== Cast ==
- Liane Haid as Tilla Morland
- Willi Forst as Ulrich Weidenau
- Margarete Schlegel as Emmy Stein
- Otto Wallburg as The Baron
- Fritz Odemar as The Editor
- Ernö Verebes as Jerome Toenli
- Hedwig Bleibtreu as Frau von Treuberg / The Lady
- Eva Schmid-Kayser as The Lady's maid
- Marcel Wittrisch as The Vocalist
- Ernst Ehlert as Dir. Baden-Baden

== See also ==
- The Song You Gave Me (1933)
