= Wemyss Ware =

Brand of Scottish pottery

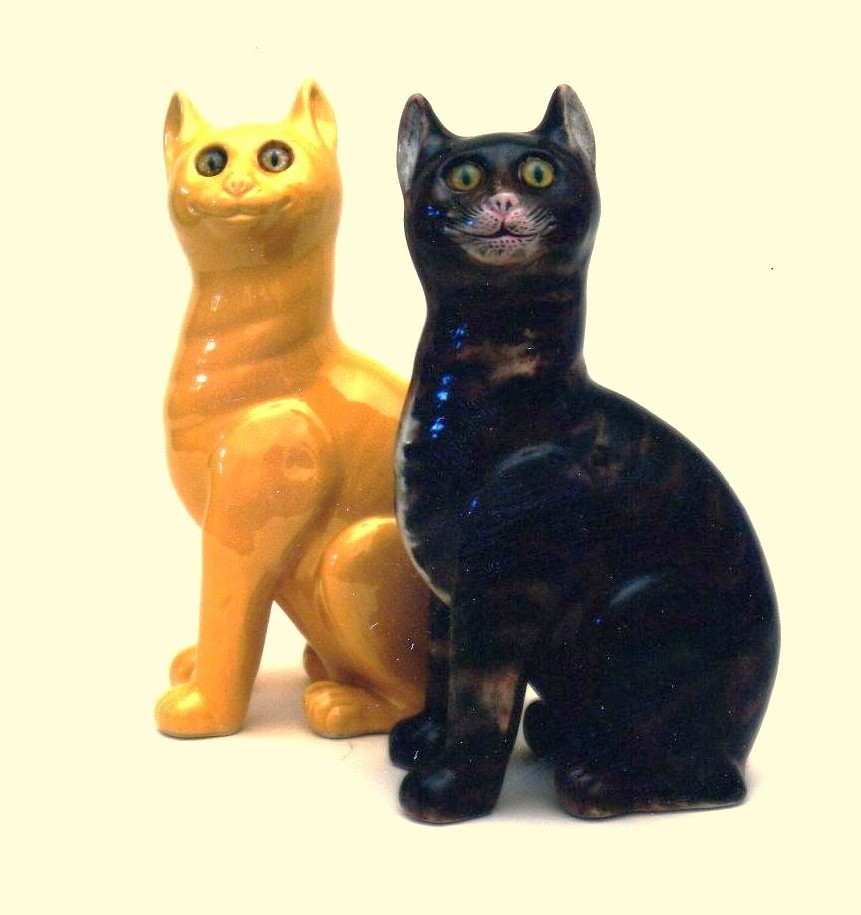
Original Wemyss Ware cats

Wemyss Ware is a brand of pottery first produced in 1882 by Czech decorator Karel Nekola and Fife pottery-owner Robert Heron at the Fife Pottery in Scotland, and subsequently by other potteries. The pottery took its name from the Wemyss family, titled incumbents of Wemyss Castle on the east coast of Fife, who were early and enthusiastic patrons of Nekola and Heron's ceramic creations. After being desirable in its own day, the pottery subsequently became extremely popular with collectors. Since 1985, the name has been used by the Griselda Hill Pottery in Ceres, Fife.

== History ==
The Wemyss Ware name has gone through four distinct phases of use. In the period 1882–1930, it was used by the Fife Pottery in Kirkcaldy, and then from 1930 to 1957, it was used by the Bovey Pottery in Devon. From 1985 to the present day, it is used by the Griselda Hill Pottery in Ceres, Fife which owns the Wemyss Trade Mark.

=== Wemyss pottery ===
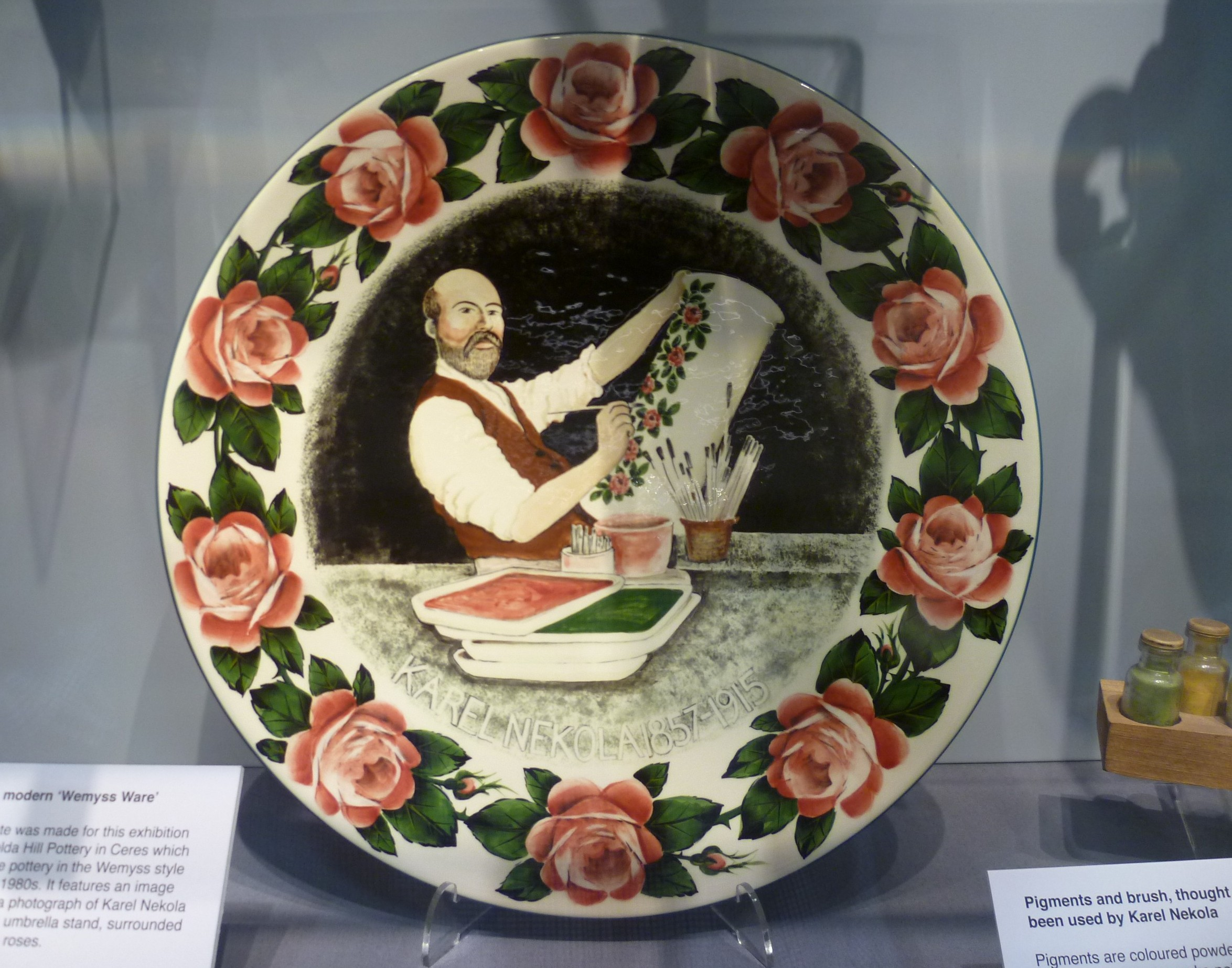
Modern Wemyss Ware plate in the Kirkcaldy Museum, commemorating Karel Nekola

One of several potteries in Kirkcaldy, the Fife Pottery or Gallatown Pottery was founded in 1817 by Archibald and Andrew Grey. It was bought ten years later by John Methven, and from there passed to Robert Heron. When his son, Robert Methven Heron (1833–1906) took over the pottery in around 1850, it became Robert Heron and Son.

By the 1880s, Robert Heron and Son were branding their products as "Wemyss ware" in honour of the Wemyss family who were avid and lucrative patrons. Karel Nekola, a native of Bohemia, was brought over to Kirkcaldy in about 1882 by Robert Heron to become head of the decorating shop there. Aged 25, he was the only one of a group of decorators to remain in Scotland, after Heron had returned from a Grand Tour of Europe with a group of Bohemian craftsmen. Nekola married Heron's cook, and the couple had six children.

Thomas Goode of London, an upmarket tableware retailer, had the exclusive right to sell Wemyss Ware in England.

Nekola's health began to deteriorate in 1910, and a pottery was built at his home in order to allow him to continue to work. He died in 1915, and was succeeded by Edwin Sandland, a painter from Staffordshire that descended from a long line of master-potters, who worked at the pottery until he died in 1928, aged 55.

=== Devon ===
The original Fife pottery closed in 1930, during the Great Depression, and the rights to Wemyss Ware were bought by the Bovey Tracey Pottery in Devon. Karel Nekola's son Joseph, himself a designer, moved to Devon, where he carried on producing Wemyss Ware and training apprentices, including Esther Weeks (née Clark). Joseph taught her painting techniques he had learned from his father.

A number of pieces produced during this time are marked as "Plichta." Jan Plichta was a Czech immigrant that sold and exported wholesale glass and pottery, and items he ordered from the Bovey Pottery were marked with his name. Some confusion exists between the Plichta and Wemyss names, as sometimes Wemyss decorators produced items for Plichta, but in the most part Plichta items are inferior in quality.

When Joseph died in 1952, Esther became head decorator and continued to paint Wemyss Ware until the Bovey Pottery closed in 1957 after a protracted strike by the workforce. The rights to the Wemyss name were assumed to be acquired by Royal Doulton, but they produced one piece of Wemyss, a commemorative goblet for the Queen Mother's 80th birthday. This piece also commemorated the centenary of Wemyss Ware, but was two years early, celebrating the production of Wemyss from 1880, when it had commenced in 1882.

=== Revival ===
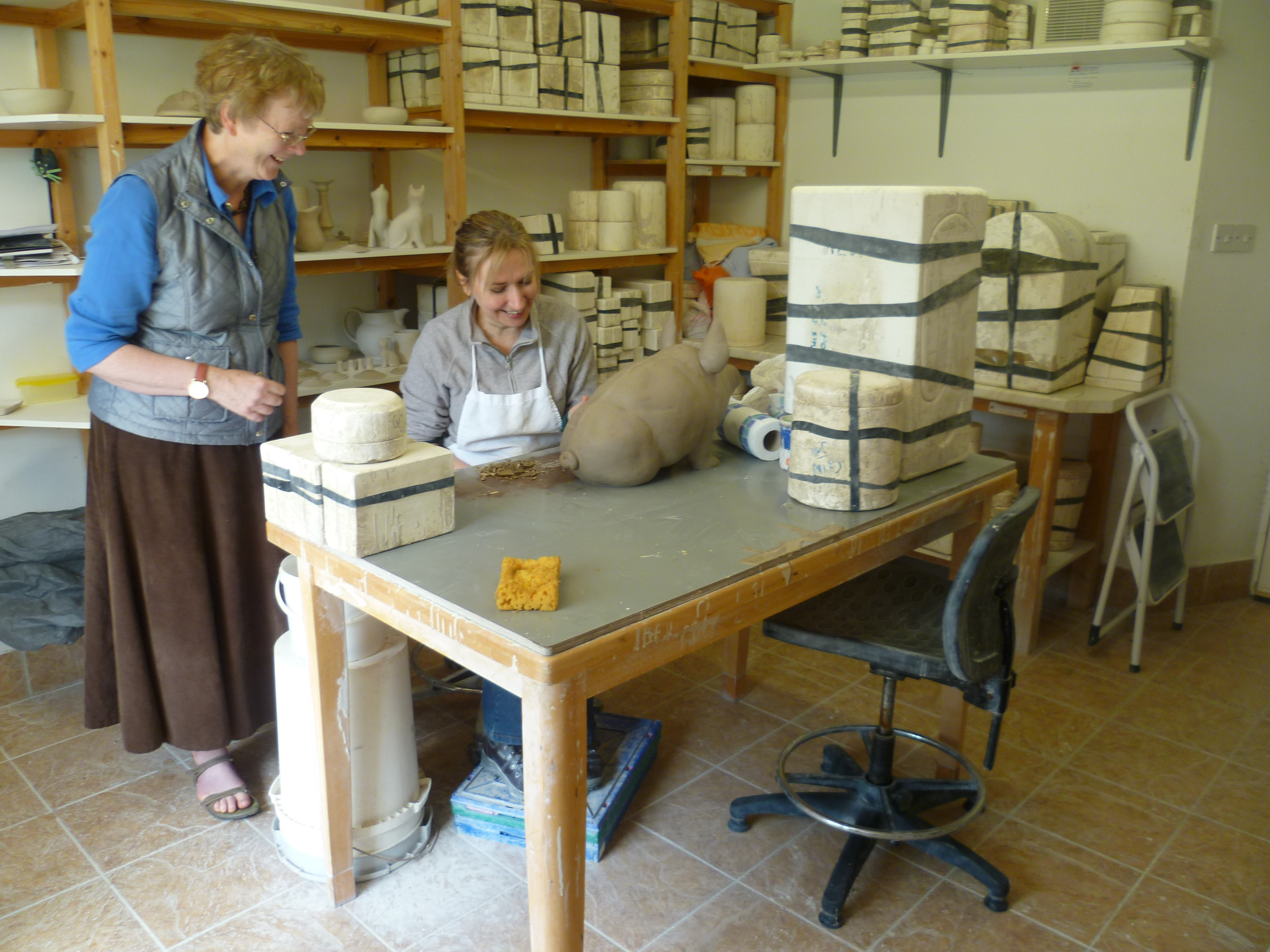
Wemyss Ware workshop. Griselda Hill is on the left

The Wemyss name was resurrected in the 1980s when Griselda Hill became interested in pottery while teaching art in London. She moved to Fife in 1984, and after seeing Wemyss Ware in the Kirkcaldy Museum and Art Gallery, she decided to create Wemyss Ware-inspired pottery. Since the first figure, a cat modelled on an original displayed in the museum, was produced, the line has grown. In 1994, the Wemyss Ware trademark was acquired by the Griselda Hill Pottery in Ceres, Fife. Esther Weeks taught the painters at Ceres techniques she learned from Joseph Nekola at Bovey.

== Style and technique ==
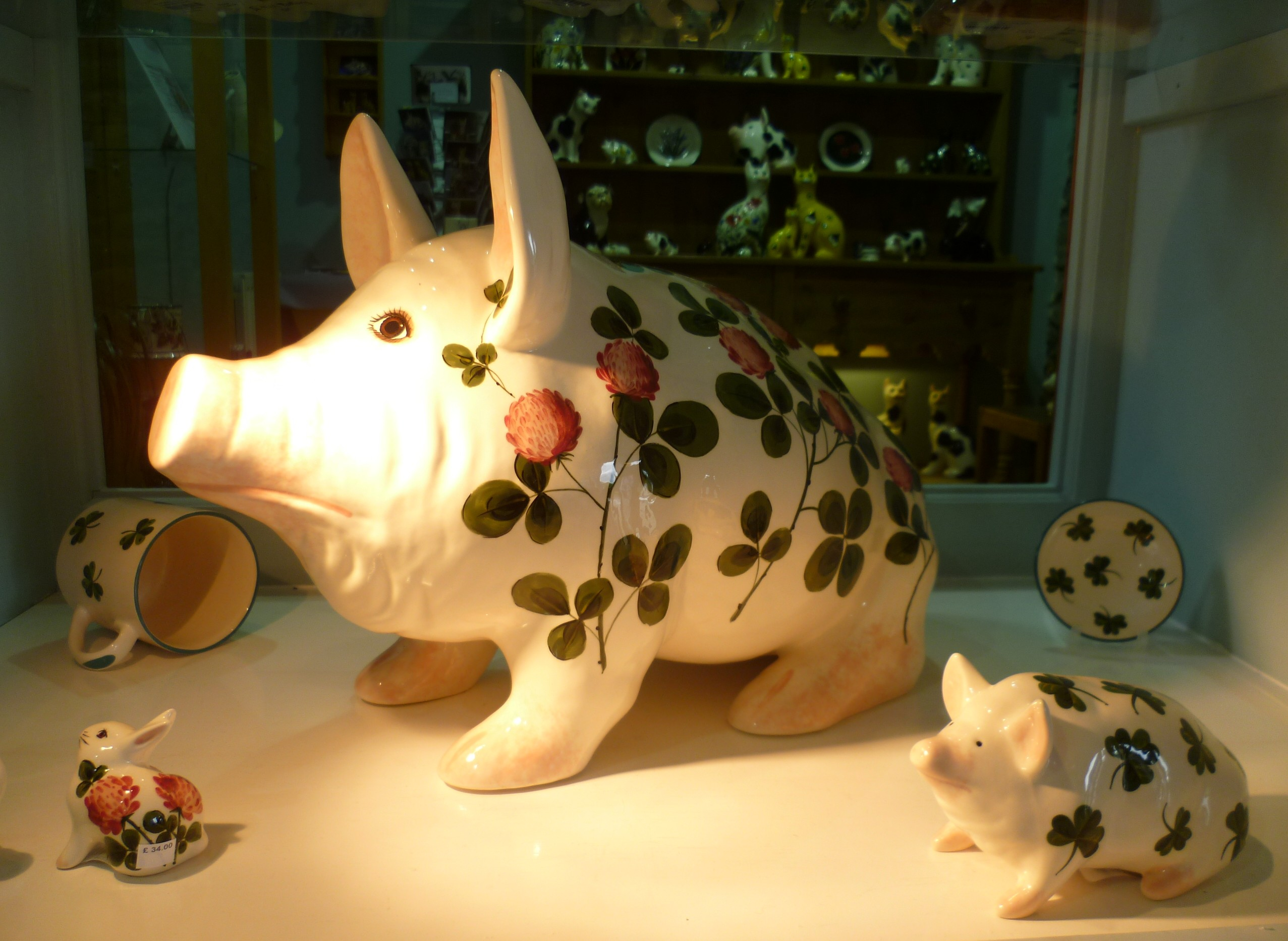
Wemyss Ware pig from the Griselda Hill Pottery

After moulding, the pottery was first fired at a low temperature to produce a porous biscuit body onto which paint could be applied. The colours were then applied, followed by a lead ceramic glaze, a technique known as underglazing. The pottery was then fired again at a low temperature in order to preserve the colour, making the product soft and fragile and contributing to the scarcity of original Wemyss. Pottery produced by the Griselda Hill pottery uses a different technique, and is much more robust.

Wemyss was decorated with natural subjects, such as fruit and flowers, in particular the cabbage rose, and British wildlife.

== Collecting ==
After being desirable in its own day, the pottery subsequently became extremely popular with collectors. The Queen Mother was a great fan of Wemyss, and is said to have amassed one of the largest private collections of the pottery.

The high value of Wemyss Ware has led to a proliferation of fakes, in particular of pigs. In 2004, a pair of sleeping piglets were sold for £34,800 each at the Sotheby's annual Scottish Sale.
