= Moretonhampstead railway station =

Disused railway station in Devon, England

Coordinates: 50.6577°N 3.7606°W

Moretonhampstead station
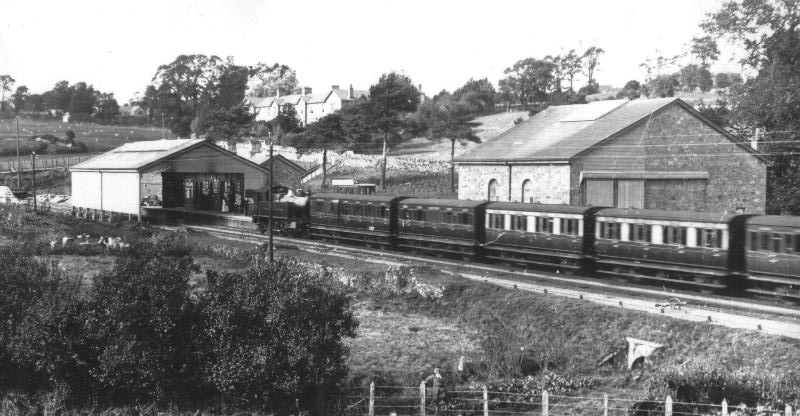
- Moretonhampstead station (circa 1909)

General information
- Location: Moretonhampstead, Teignbridge; England
- Platforms: 1

Other information
- Status: Disused

History
- Post-grouping: Great Western Railway

Key dates
- 4 July 1866: Opened
- 2 March 1959: Closed to passengers
- 6 April 1964: Line closed to goods traffic
Location

Moretonhampstead railway station was the terminus of the Moretonhampstead and South Devon Railway at Moretonhampstead, Devon, England.

== History ==
The station opened on 4 July 1866; it was situated on the south side of the town by the road to Bovey Tracey. The platform was 300 feet (91 m) long and mostly covered by a wooden train shed. Beyond the train shed was a short platform with cattle pens.

South of the station was a goods shed and engine shed. The signal box was unusually built onto the side of the engine shed.

In 1929, the Great Western Railway, which now owned the line, opened the Manor House Hotel just outside Moretonhampstead. Set in 193 acres (0.78 km^{2}), it boasted a golf course and also attracted holidaymakers to visit Dartmoor.

After the last passenger train ran on 28 February 1959, regular goods trains continued until 6 April 1964, although British Railways continued to use the station as a base for its road goods services until the end of the year.

== The site today ==
Although the train shed was demolished shortly after the station's closure, the goods and engine sheds were retained; these are now used by a commercial road haulage business. Part of the platform is extant.

Preceding station	Disused railways	Following station
Lusteigh	Newton Abbot to Moretonhampstead; Great Western Railway	Terminus
