= Lustleigh railway station =

Disused railway station in Devon, England

Coordinates: 50.6200°N 3.71674°W

Lustleigh
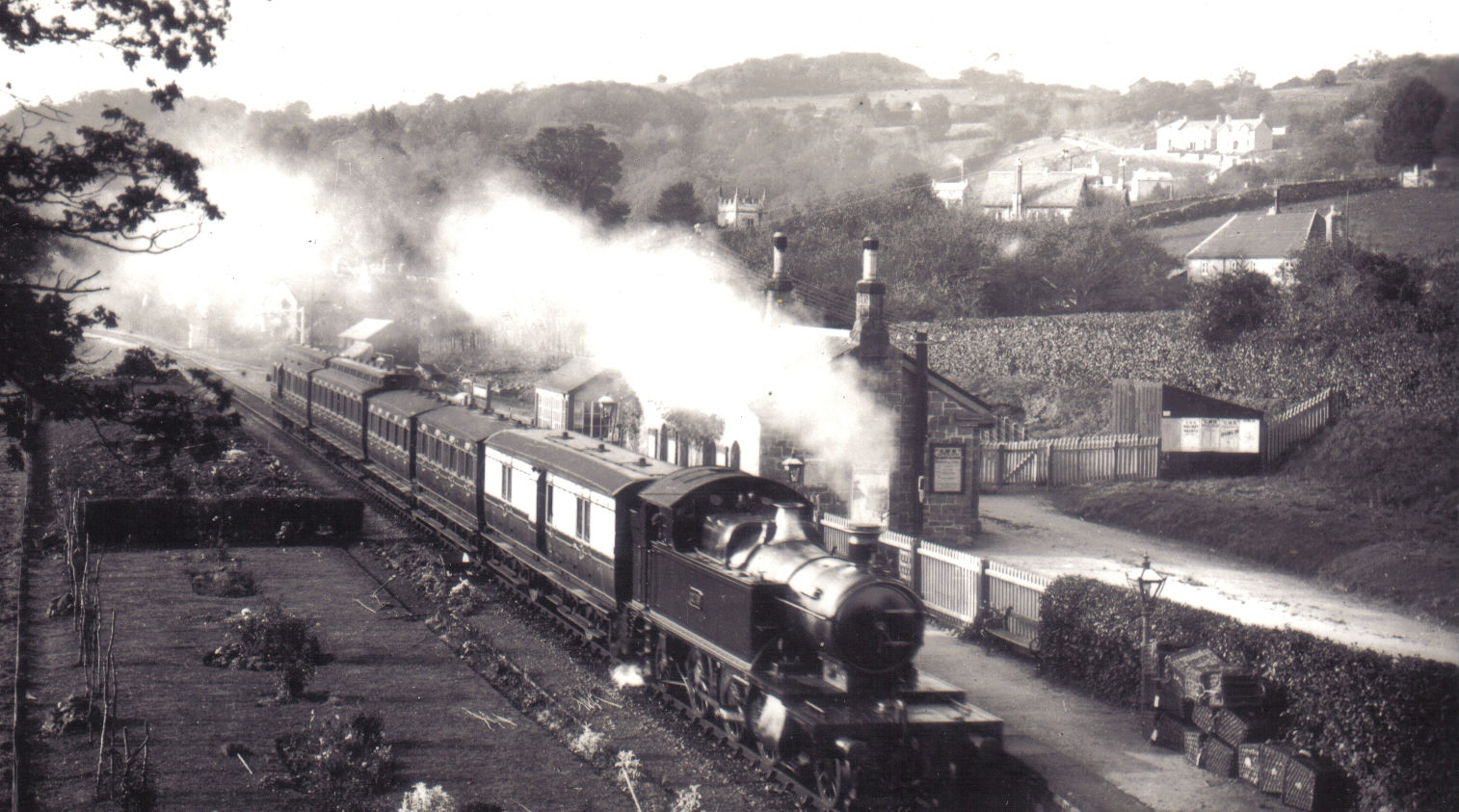
- Lustleigh station in 1912, with a train for Moretonhampstead

General information
- Location: Lustleigh, Teignbridge; England
- Grid reference: SX786814
- Platforms: 1

Other information
- Status: Disused

History
- Post-grouping: Great Western Railway

Key dates
- 4 July 1866: Opened
- 2 March 1959: Closed to passengers
- 1964: Line closed to goods traffic
Location

Lustleigh station was a stop on the Moretonhampstead and South Devon Railway; it served the village of Lustleigh, in Devon, England.

Lustleigh was the penultimate station on this 12.3 mile (20 km) branch line off the South Devon Main Line. It had a single platform and one siding.

The Moretonhampstead and South Devon Railway company was formed in 1861, and work on the line commenced in 1863. The line opened to the public in 1866; it was converted from broad gauge to standard gauge in 1892.

The station was used on 28 February 1931 for the film The Hound of the Baskervilles; its name changed temporarily to Baskerville.

The station was host to a GWR camp coach from 1934 to 1939. A camping coach was also positioned here by the Western Region from 1952 to 1958.

The station closed to passengers after the last train on 28 February 1959, with goods trains continuing until 1964.

Preceding station	Disused railways	Following station
Pullabrook Halt	Newton Abbot to Moretonhampstead; Great Western Railway	Moretonhampstead

== The site today ==
The platform survives and the station building has been greatly enlarged.
