= The Hound of the Baskervilles (1932 film) =

1932 film

- U.S. poster
- Directed by: Gareth Gundrey
- Written by: Edgar Wallace
- Based on: The Hound of the Baskervilles; 1902 novel by Sir Arthur Conan Doyle
- Produced by: Michael Balcon
- Starring: John Stuart; Robert Rendel; Frederick Lloyd
- Cinematography: Bernard Knowles
- Edited by: Ian Dalrymple
- Production company: Gainsborough Pictures
- Distributed by: Gaumont British Distributors (UK)
- Release date: 10 April 1932 (London)
- Running time: 72 minutes
- Country: United Kingdom
- Language: English

The Hound of the Baskervilles is a 1932 British mystery film directed by Gareth Gundrey and starring John Stuart, Robert Rendel and Frederick Lloyd. It is based on the 1902 novel The Hound of the Baskervilles by Arthur Conan Doyle, in which Sherlock Holmes is called in to investigate a suspicious death on Dartmoor. It was made by Gainsborough Pictures. The screenplay was written by Edgar Wallace.

== Plot ==
According to the rumour, a beastly howl is heard in the moors of Dartmoor, and a hellhound is killing every member of the Baskerville family. Sherlock Holmes and his assistant Dr. Watson go there to investigate the case, only to discover that behind this mystery there is a local farmer who is using a phosphorescent dog to kill the heirs in order to obtain the inheritance.

== Cast ==
- John Stuart as Sir Henry Baskerville
- Robert Rendel as Sherlock Holmes
- Frederick Lloyd as Dr. Watson
- Heather Angel as Beryl Stapleton
- Reginald Bach as Stapleton
- Wilfred Shine as Dr. Mortimer
- Sam Livesey as Sir Hugo Baskerville
- Henry Hallett as Barrymore
- Sybil Jane as Mrs. Barrymore
- Elizabeth Vaughan as Mrs. Laura Lyons

== Reception ==
Contemporary reviews found the film lacking. Bioscope claimed: "It is upon the dialogue of Edgar Wallace rather than sustained action that the producer relies to hold his audience, and the development becomes tedious in the attempt to piece together the various phases of the mystery." Picturegoer said: "This picture fails to do justice to Conan Doyle's thrilling Sherlock Holmes story."

== Production ==
The first sound version of The Hound of the Baskervilles, it had a budget of £25,000 (equivalent to £1,500,000 in 2025).

On 28 February 1931 Lustleigh railway station, on the then-Great Western Railway, was used as the location for 'Baskerville' station at which Sherlock Holmes and Dr. Watson are seen arriving.

For many years, it was believed that only the (silent) picture negative of this movie still existed. However, in 1991, a complete set of negatives and soundtracks were donated to the British Film Institute (BFI) by the Rank Corporation. As such, the film now survives intact (and with sound) in the BFI archives.
