= Bovey Tracey =

Town in Devon, England

Coordinates: 50.593°N 3.672°W

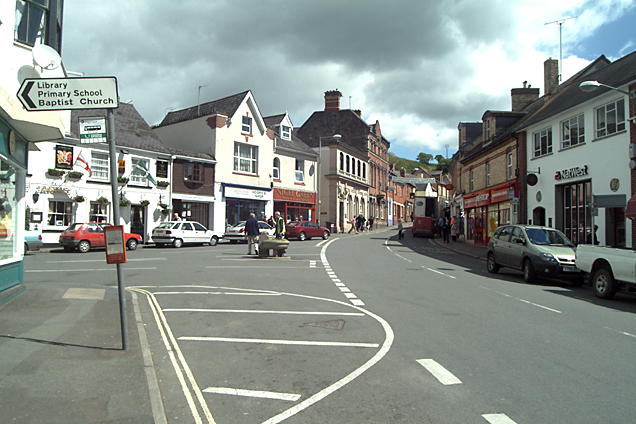
- Bovey Tracey town square

- Location within Devon
- Population: 7,996 (2021 Census)
- OS grid reference: SX817784
- District: Teignbridge
- Shire county: Devon
- Region: South West
- Country: England
- Sovereign state: United Kingdom
- Post town: NEWTON ABBOT
- Postcode district: TQ13
- Dialling code: 01626
- Police: Devon and Cornwall
- Fire: Devon and Somerset
- Ambulance: South Western
- UK Parliament: Central Devon

Bovey Tracey (/ˌbʌvi ˈtreɪsi/) is a market town and civil parish in Devon, England. It is located on the edge of Dartmoor, which gives rise to the slogan used on the town's boundary signs: The Gateway to the Moor. It is often known locally as Bovey. About 10 miles (16 km) south-west of Exeter, it lies on the A382 road, about halfway between Newton Abbot and Moretonhampstead. The town is at the centre of the electoral ward of Bovey. At the 2021 census, it had a population of 7,996, which was an increase on the 7,168 recorded in the 2011 census.

== History ==
Bovey Tracey was an established Saxon community and takes its name from the River Bovey. The name first appears in the Domesday Book of 1086 as Bovi and possibly earlier as Buui. The town gained its second name from the de Tracey family, who were lords of the manor after the Norman Conquest of 1066, and was first documented as Bovitracy in 1309.

One member of the family, William de Tracy, was implicated in the murder of Archbishop Thomas Becket in Canterbury Cathedral in 1170. It is thought that he rebuilt the parish church of St Peter, St Paul and St Thomas of Canterbury as penance for the murder. In the early 13th century, Henry de Tracey created a borough here and, in 1259, was granted the right to hold a weekly market and an annual three-day fair.

During the English Civil War, on 9 January 1646, Oliver Cromwell and a contingent of his Roundhead army entered Bovey Tracey after dark and caught part of Lord Wentworth's Regiment by surprise, catching a number of officers playing cards in an inn. Many of Wentworth's Royalist troops escaped, but Cromwell did capture about 400 horses. If local legend is to be believed, the Royalists escaped by throwing coins from the windows in order to distract the poorly paid Roundhead troops. The next day a battle was fought on nearby Bovey Heath ending in victory for Cromwell's army.

The name of Cromwell lives on in the town today in both the public house, The Cromwell Arms, and the remains of a nearby stone arch, known locally (and incorrectly) as Cromwell's Arch. The arch is claimed to be what is left of a priory that stood previously on the site of the nearby Baptist Church. It has been shown through many historical documents that this is a local myth perpetuated by local historians, and that there is no evidence that a priory once stood in the centre of Bovey Tracey.

The Bovey Tracey Potteries operated from the 1750s for about 200 years.

Bovey Tracey was twinned with Le Molay-Littry in Normandy, France; however, in February 2018, local councillors discovered surprisingly that the French town had unexpectedly twinned with another location, Theydon Bois in Essex.

== Geography ==
Bovey Tracey lies in the valley of the River Bovey at the junction of the A382 road (between Newton Abbot and Moretonhampstead) and the B3387 road (Chudleigh Knighton to Haytor Vale).

=== Climate ===
Between 1977 and 2008, the highest recorded temperature was 31.8 °C (89.2 °F) on 3 August 1990 and the lowest was −10.7 °C (12.7 °F) on 13 January 1987.

Climate data for Bovey Tracey, Yarner Wood (1991–2020 averages) (extremes 1977-2010)
Month	Jan	Feb	Mar	Apr	May	Jun	Jul	Aug	Sep	Oct	Nov	Dec	Year
Record high °C (°F)	15.2 (59.4)	15.1 (59.2)	19.6 (67.3)	22.0 (71.6)	26.7 (80.1)	29.3 (84.7)	30.5 (86.9)	31.8 (89.2)	25.5 (77.9)	22.9 (73.2)	18.5 (65.3)	15.2 (59.4)	31.8 (89.2)
Mean daily maximum °C (°F)	7.9 (46.2)	8.3 (46.9)	10.5 (50.9)	13.3 (55.9)	16.1 (61.0)	19.0 (66.2)	20.8 (69.4)	20.5 (68.9)	18.0 (64.4)	14.2 (57.6)	10.9 (51.6)	8.5 (47.3)	14.0 (57.2)
Daily mean °C (°F)	5.3 (41.5)	5.4 (41.7)	7.0 (44.6)	9.1 (48.4)	11.8 (53.2)	14.5 (58.1)	16.4 (61.5)	16.3 (61.3)	14.1 (57.4)	11.1 (52.0)	8.1 (46.6)	5.9 (42.6)	10.5 (50.9)
Mean daily minimum °C (°F)	2.7 (36.9)	2.6 (36.7)	3.6 (38.5)	4.9 (40.8)	7.5 (45.5)	10.0 (50.0)	12.0 (53.6)	12.1 (53.8)	10.3 (50.5)	8.0 (46.4)	5.4 (41.7)	3.3 (37.9)	6.9 (44.4)
Record low °C (°F)	−10.7 (12.7)	−9.7 (14.5)	−6.0 (21.2)	−2.4 (27.7)	0.5 (32.9)	3.0 (37.4)	5.2 (41.4)	6.4 (43.5)	3.5 (38.3)	−1.5 (29.3)	−4.0 (24.8)	−13.7 (7.3)	−13.7 (7.3)
Average precipitation mm (inches)	178.8 (7.04)	133.0 (5.24)	111.9 (4.41)	93.6 (3.69)	80.1 (3.15)	83.1 (3.27)	73.6 (2.90)	91.9 (3.62)	93.9 (3.70)	158.7 (6.25)	154.6 (6.09)	185.7 (7.31)	1,438.8 (56.65)
Average precipitation days (≥ 1.0 mm)	16.4	13.9	12.3	11.7	10.4	9.5	9.4	11.1	10.1	15.2	16.2	16.9	153.0
Mean monthly sunshine hours	54.5	79.8	123.7	179.3	203.6	203.8	209.1	188.0	148.7	99.2	68.3	47.4	1,605.2
Source 1: Met Office
Source 2: Starlings Roost Weather

== Transport ==
Bovey Tracey is served by Newton Abbot railway station, which lies on the Exeter-Plymouth line. Great Western Railway operates local services to Exmouth, Exeter St Davids, Dawlish, Teignmouth and Paignton; it also provides inter-city services to London Paddington, Reading, Plymouth and Penzance.

The town was once served by Bovey railway station; it opened on 26 June 1866 with the new Moretonhampstead and South Devon Railway, on a site to the west of the town. It closed to passengers on 28 February 1959, but goods trains continued to operate until 6 July 1970.

The main bus operators in the area are Stagecoach South West and Country Bus (Newton Abbot). Key routes link the town with Exeter, Newton Abbot, Moretonhampstead, Tavistock and Ivybridge.

== Notable features ==
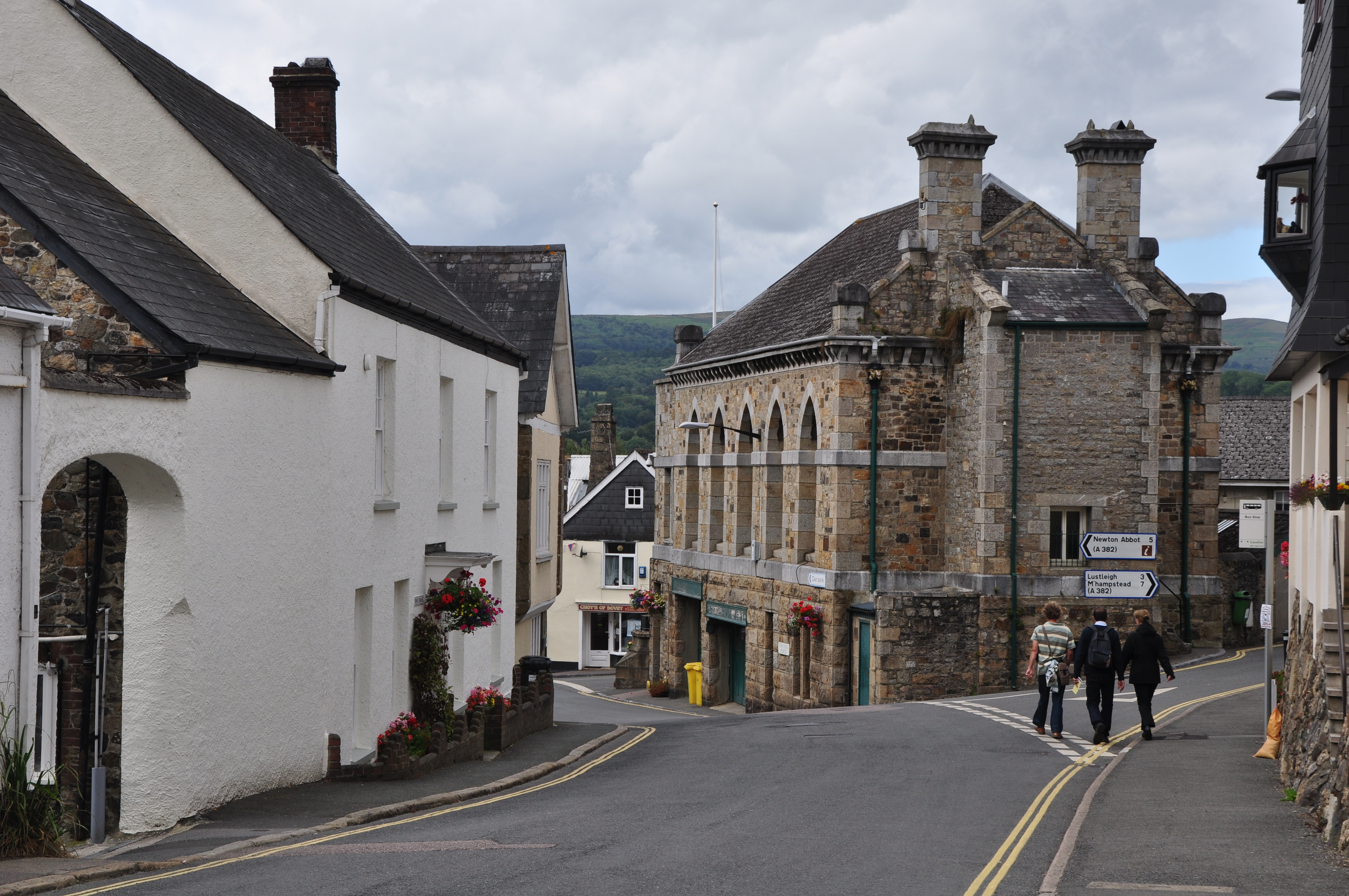
Bovey Tracey Town Hall

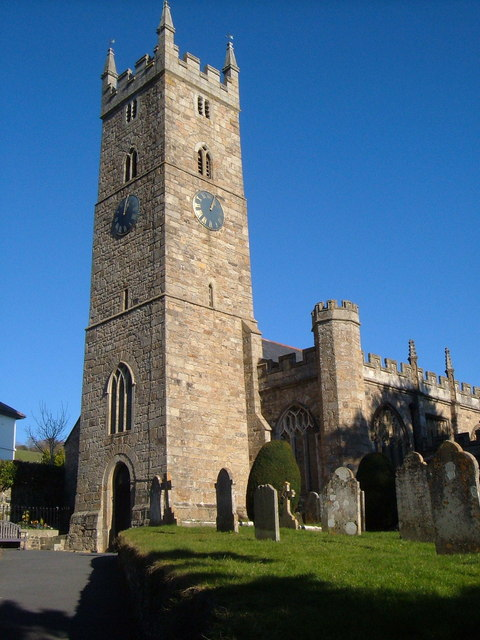
Church of St Peter, St Paul and St Thomas of Canterbury

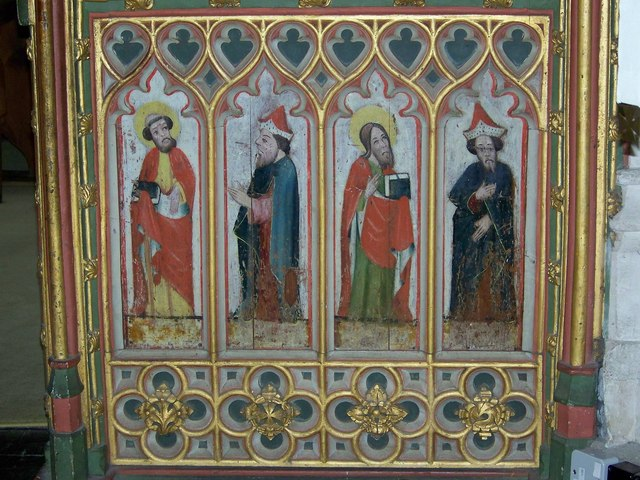
Original paintings of apostles and prophets on the wainscot of the rood screen, restored by Anna Hulbert, dated to the early 16th century

The town has over a hundred listed buildings. The parish church, at the top of the town, is grade I listed. It has a tower dating from the 14th century, many 15th-century carvings including three misericords and a screen described by Arthur Mee as "one of the finest in this county of fine screens". The screen was restored in 1887 with the central panels the work of Charles Edgar Buckeridge. The church has an unbroken list of vicars from 1258. On Hind Street, the East Dartmoor Baptist Church was built in 1824 and is now grade II listed. The church was founded by workers in the Bovey Potteries. Bovey Tracey Town Hall was completed in 1866.

Since 1986, the Devon Guild of Craftsmen contemporary crafts gallery has occupied a building known as Riverside Mill, on the bank of the River Bovey. The building, dating from 1854, has an undershot waterwheel that was used to pump water up to a tank in its tower. The stored water was used as the supply for a nearby house owned by John Divett and to water its stable yard and gardens. Nearby, the Bovey Tracey Heritage Centre in the disused Bovey railway station is run by volunteers and is open in the summer months.

On the outskirts of the town are the House of Marbles, a visitor attraction on the site of the historic pottery; and the headquarters of the Dartmoor National Park Authority at Parke, a large house which is leased to the authority by the National Trust. Also nearby are a Devon Wildlife Trust nature reserve at Bovey Heath and the Haytor Granite Tramway, the route of which runs through the parish, west of the town.

According to the town council, the town has a "good mixture of shops" and there is a farmers' market on alternate Saturday mornings.

The town also hosts multiple events throughout the year for both tourists and the local community, including:

- Nourish, a food and gin festival held in September
- Green Man Festival of morris dancers and other folk traditions, at the end of April.
- Contemporary Craft Festival, held in June.
- Bovey Tracey Carnival, held in August.

== Historic estates ==
Within the parish of Bovey Tracey are various historic estates, including:

- Indio, long a seat of the Southcott family, later of Bentinck. The Indeo Pottery was established here between about 1766 and 1785.
- Parke, seat of Nicholas Eveleigh (d.1620) whose monument with effigy survives in Bovey Tracey Church. His widow married Elize Hele, whose monument and effigy faces that of Eveleigh. There are several inscribed tablets to later owners in Bovey Tracey Church. Now the headquarters of the Dartmoor National Park Authority.

== Sport ==
Bovey Tracey is the start point of the Dartmoor Devil bicycle ride, an annual Audax UK Brevet Populaire event held in late October that takes in over 2,000 m of climbing and over 100 km around and across Dartmoor, the ride ends in nearby Manaton.

The town has a Non-League football club Bovey Tracey A.F.C. who play at The Western Counties Roofing Ground in the South West Peninsula League.

There is also Bovey Tracey Cricket Club, founded in 1875, which is located in the middle of the town. They are currently playing in the first division of the Devon Cricket League. Just next to the cricket club is Bovey Tracey Lawn Tennis Club also located there. They are in division 3 of the East Devon Tennis League.
