= Stover Country Park =

Woodland park in Teigngrace, Devon, England

Coordinates: 50.565°N 3.647°W

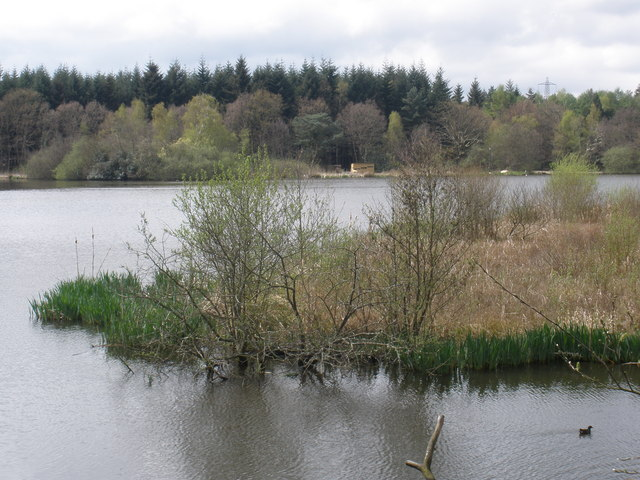
The lake at the centre of Stover Country Park

Stover Country Park is an area of woodland park 2 miles (3 km) north of Newton Abbot in the parish of Teigngrace, Devon, within the former grounds of Stover House. The reserve is 114 acres (46 ha) in size, and is managed by Devon County Council.

== History ==
The park is a small part of the originally 80,000-acre estate of James Templer, who built Stover House (now occupied by Stover School) with his fortune made building dockyards. He also significantly landscaped the area, including building the lake which is now at the centre of the park, and covers around 10 acres (4.0 ha), fed from the Ventiford Brook.

The Forestry Commission purchased the site in the 1930s, but by 1972 it was considered surplus to requirements and entered into negotiation with Newton Abbot Rural Council to sell the land as a recreational area.

In 1979, a sale was completed to Devon County Council of 114 acres to make the council's third country park. The council used grants to provide a year's temporary employment to 14 people in making the site suitable for a country park by clearing overgrown areas, building bridges, and making pathways. In 1980, the council planned a £100k alternative technology centre on the site to showcase energy from sun, wind, and water.

The park was designated a Site of Special Scientific Interest (SSSI) in 1984 by the Nature Conservancy Council (now Natural England) due to its rare dragonfly species and invertebrates, and was added to the register of Historic Parks and Gardens in 1995. It was then declared a Local Nature Reserve in 2001.

== Features ==
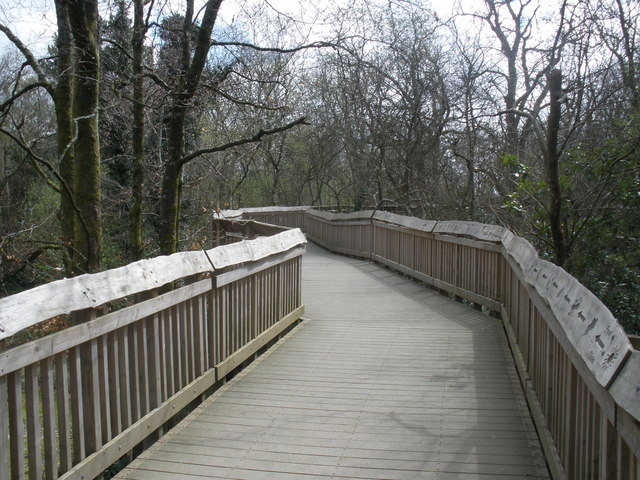
The aerial walkway within Stover Country Park

The park has a number of special features including an aerial walkway, the original Stover gatehouse, a poetry trail, and interpretation centre.

=== Interpretation centre ===
The interpretation centre opened in 2000, and has displays about the wildlife within the park, including interactive displays and remote cameras, and classroom facilities for groups.

=== Aerial walkway ===
Opened in 2003, the walkway is raised above the ground and follows a 90 metres (300 ft) route through the woodland's lower canopy. This allows a closer view of the mature oak trees, as well as lakes and ponds below. it also features interpretation boards and children's poems and art carved in to the rails.

=== Poetry trail ===
There is a trail dedicated to former Poet Laureate Ted Hughes, featuring his poems etched in granite posts around the site, and all relating the natural world, some of which are illustrated by Raymond Briggs. The trail was installed in 2006.
