= South Devon Hunt =

Foxhound pack in Devon, England

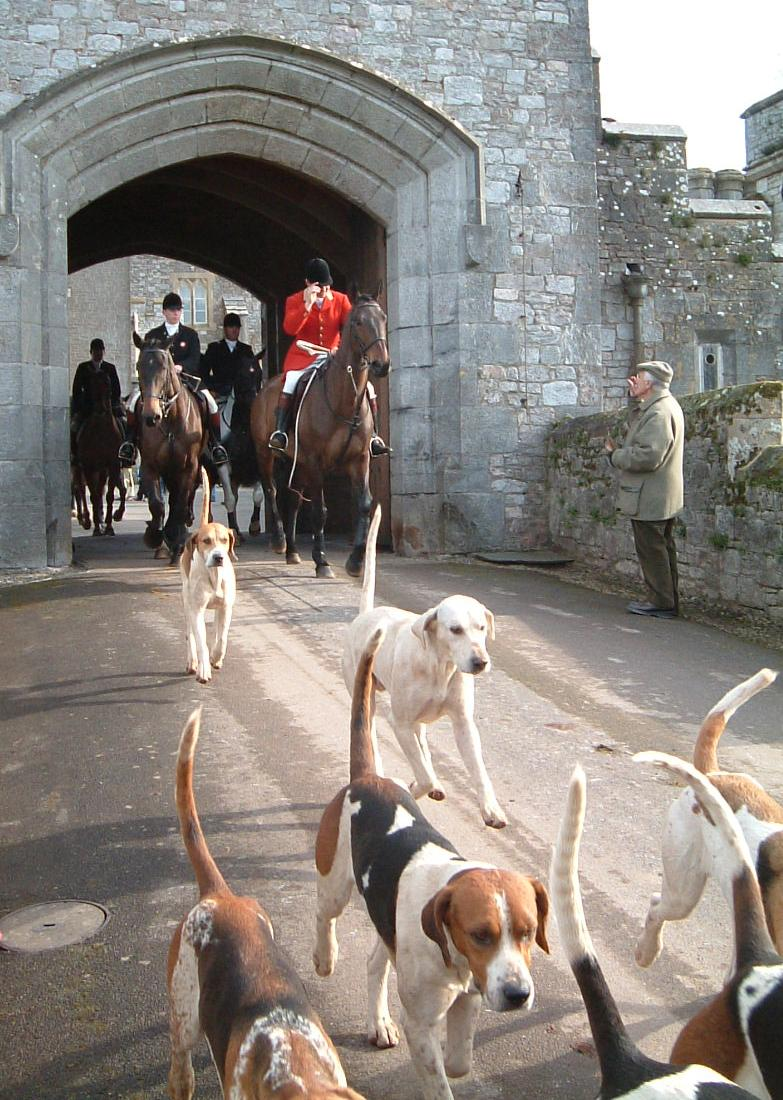
Master of foxhounds leads the South Devon Hunt field from Powderham Castle in Devon, England, with the hounds in front.

The South Devon Hunt or South Devon Foxhounds is a foxhound pack in Devon, England. The country spans an area entirely within the county of Devon, predominantly on the East side of Dartmoor, out to the sea. Traditionally, the country was the land between the River Exe and the River Dart from Exeter to Totnes.

== History ==
=== Foundation by George Templer ===
Whilst hunting had almost certainly occurred in the area before, the South Devon Hunt was founded by landowner George Templer, the owner of the Stover estate in Teigngrace. The exact date of formation is unknown, but by 1810 a number of hounds were drafted from Stover to the Duke of Rutland's Belvoir Hunt, in a rare instance of one of the country's pre-eminent traditional hunts bringing in hounds from another pack. This must mean that the hounds must have been of some quality, and presumably had been bred so over a number of preceding years.

Templer was focused on the chase, rather than catching the fox, and was known for catching the foxes alive after they had been run down by the hounds, where they were caught for release in the future. One fox, nicknamed "The Bold Dragoon" was noted to have been caught and released no fewer than thirty-six times.

In 1826, Templer was forced to sell Stover following the collapse of his business under the costs of building the Haytor Granite Tramway, and the hunt took the only break in its history, with no meets in the 1826–7 season.

Templer died at his new home of Sandford Orleigh, Newton Abbot in December 1843 following an accident in the hunting field.

== Masters ==
The following have all been masters of the South Devon Hunt.

- 18xx-1826 - George Templer
- 1827-1829 - John King of Fowlescombe
- 1829-1843 - Sir Walter Palk Carew, 8th Baronet of Haccombe
- 1843-1845 - Captain Martin E Haworth
- 1845-1849 - Thomas Veale Lane
- 1849-1851 - Sir Henry Paul Seale, 2nd Baronet of Mount Boone
- 1851-1856 - John Whidborne
- 1856-1865 - Sir Henry Paul Seale (second mastership)
- 1865-1875 - Thomas Westlake
- 1875-1878 - Augustus F Ross

Partition of the country

Haldon side

- 1878-1882 - Lawrence Palk, 1st Baron Haldon
- 1882-1884 - Edward Fairfax Studd, 4th Baronet of Netheravon
- 1884-1886 - Lord Haldon
- 1886-1891 - Sir Edward Fairfax Studd (second mastership)
- 1879-1882 - Augustus F Ross (second mastership)
- 1882-1885 - John Whidborne (second mastership)

Newton side

- 1878-1879 - Mr E Fearnley Tanner
- 1879-1882 - Augustus F Ross (second mastership)
- 1882-1885 - Mr Whidborne

Reunion

- 1885-1893 - Dr Henry Searle Gaye
- 1893-1897 - Harold St Maur, MP
- 1897-1901 - Robert Vicary and Washington Singer, Joint Masters
- 1901-1907 - Washington Singer
- 1907-1913 - Hubert Fawcett Brunskill of Glazebrook House, South Brent
- 1913-1915 - Major JA Cooke-Hurle
- 1915-1921 - Herbert Whitley and William Whitley (Joint masters)
- 1921-1930 - William Whitley
- 1930-1931 - Major Gerald Achilles Burgoyne
- 1931-1934 - Committee management
- 1934-1938 - William Whitley and William Stadd
- 1938-1953 - Claude Whitley (son of William Whitley)
- 1953-1960 - Claude Whitley and Dennis Ferrens (joint masters)
- 1960-1963 - Claude Whitley and Colonel AB Coote (joint masters)
- 1963-1970 - Claude Whitley
- 1970-1974 - Claude Whitley and Anthony Austin (joint masters)
- 1974-1980 - Claude Whitley
- 1980-1985 -
- 1985-1991 - David Herring and Peter Ripman
- 1991-19xx - Hugh Whitley (son of Claude Whitley) and Peter Ripman

== Sabotage ==
The South Devon was amongst the first hunts to be subject to organised hunt sabotage, with the formation in Brixham of the Hunt Saboteurs Association in December 1963.
