= James Templer =

James Templer may refer to:

- James Templer (balloon aviator) (1846–1924), early British military pioneer of balloons
- James Templer (civil engineer) (1722–1782), self-made magnate and civil engineer
- James Templer (canal builder) (1748–1813), Devon landowner and builder of the Stover Canal
- James Templer (equestrian) (1936–2023), British Olympic equestrian
