= Harold St Maur =

British politician

Harold St. Maur

Lieutenant Colonel Richard Harold St Maur JP DL (pronounced "Seemer"; 6 June 1869 – 5 April 1927) was an unsuccessful claimant to the Dukedom of Somerset and briefly a Liberal Member of Parliament for Exeter, being unseated on an election petition by a single vote.

== Early life ==
St Maur was born in Brighton in 1869, the illegitimate son of Edward Seymour, Earl St Maur, and grandson of Edward Seymour, 12th Duke of Somerset. He had a sister, Ruth Cavendish Bentinck, who was a noted suffragist. His mother was a 19-year-old half-gipsy maid named Rosina Elizabeth Swan of Higham, near Bury St. Edmunds; St Maur's father died within months of his birth.

He was educated at Wellington College and Sandhurst, and served with the 14th Hussars and later with the Royal 1st Devon Yeomanry. He was appointed a second lieutenant in the Reserve on 21 February 1900. He fought in the Boer War at Natal with the 7th Remounts and the Royal 1st Devon Imperial Yeomanry. St Maur wrote a book which he titled "Notebook for Officers and Non-Commissioned Officers of the Yeomanry".

In 1891 he married Elizabeth, a daughter of Captain W. H. Palmer, of the 14th Hussars, and there were three sons from the marriage. St Maur lived at Stover Park, near Newton Abbot, which he inherited from his grandfather the 12th Duke of Somerset in 1885. He was a member of Newton Abbot Urban District Council.

From 1893 to 1897, he was Master of the South Devon Hunt, founded by the builder of his house at Stover, George Templer.

== Brief political career ==
St Maur had been identified with radical and Labour politics in Mid Devon and had given campaign donations to Labour candidates. In 1909 he was selected as Liberal candidate for the Exeter constituency, where the sitting Liberal member, Sir George Kekewich, was retiring; the Conservatives were expected to regain the seat easily. At the January 1910 election St Maur was beaten by Henry Duke by just 26 votes. The parliament did not last long, and at the second general election in December 1910, St Maur stood again in Exeter, this time triumphing over Duke by just four votes, after a recount, and was declared elected by that margin on 3 December 1910, although there were several disputed ballot papers. The Conservatives launched an election petition, which was heard at the Exeter Guildhall over a period of a week in April 1911, before Mr. Justice Ridley and Mr. Justice Channell.

=== Election petition ===
The first day of the petition concerned fourteen votes which were disputed by either side. On the first scrutiny of the votes, St Maur's majority of four votes was eliminated, placing the candidates level. Then St Maur went ahead again by two votes, only to fall back to level pegging again. However, Henry Duke's lawyers established a case of personation, which gave Duke a lead of one vote at the end of the first day.

On the second day, two of Duke's votes were disallowed, putting St. Maur back into the lead by one vote. The third and fourth days were taken up with evidence regarding voters being paid for bill-distribution. On the fifth day, the Judges struck five votes off St. Maur's total, putting Duke ahead by four votes, although Mr. Justice Channell said if he had been hearing the case alone he would not have disallowed so many. On the other hand, he opined that if Mr. Justice Ridley had been acting alone he would have disallowed more.

On the sixth day two of Duke's votes were disallowed, on the grounds that the voter had been paid to distribute cards, or in the latter case the voter's son had been paid to run messages on polling day. A further two votes in Duke's column were disallowed when it was proved in Court that the voters were underage. Thus at the end of the sixth day the candidates were level again on 4,777 votes apiece.

On the seventh day, the Court heard evidence that a man named Pannell or Purnell had been paid five shillings by the Liberals to act as a tally clerk. The Judges disallowed this vote, and since St. Maur's lawyers had indicated no further challenges, Henry Duke was declared elected by a single vote.

== Later career ==
St Maur served in the First World War, at Gallipoli, then in the campaign against the Senussi, and finally as liaison officer between Lord Allenby and the French Forces. For this work he was awarded the Legion of Honour and the Croix de Guerre with palms. He was Master of the South Devon Foxhounds for many years.

== Peerage claim ==
In 1925, after the death of the 15th Duke of Somerset, St. Maur petitioned the House of Lords Committee for Privileges to safeguard his claim to the Dukedom, in the hope that he might find proof that his parents were married before his birth. On the death of his grandfather the 12th Duke in 1885, St Maur had been presumed to be illegitimate, and the Dukedom eventually passed to a distant branch of the family. He also placed advertisements in newspapers, offering a £50 reward for any witness to his parents' marriage.

== Death and memorial ==
St Maur died at Kipipiri, Gilgil, Kenya, in 1927, aged 57. There is a mural monument to him in Teigngrace church inscribed as follows:

In loving memory of Lt. Col. Richard Harold St Maur of Stover. Late 14th Kings Hussars and Royal 1st Devon Yeomanry served in South African war 1900 and in the Great War 1914 to 1919, Gallipoli, Egypt, Palestine and Syria, Liaison Officer between field Marshal Sir Edmund Allenby and the French Forces. Officer de la Legion d'honneur et le croix de Guerre avec trois palmes. Born 6th June 1869 - Died 5th April 1927 at Kipipiri British East Africa.

== See also ==
- List of United Kingdom MPs with the shortest service

Parliament of the United Kingdom
Preceded by Henry Duke	Member of Parliament for Exeter; December 1910 – 1911	Succeeded by Henry Duke
