= James Templer (civil engineer) =

British civil engineer (1722–1782)

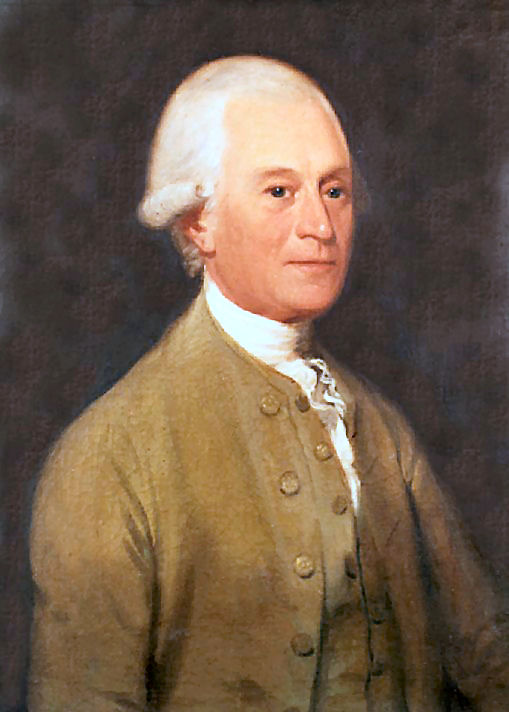
James Templer (1722–1782), portrait by unknown artist

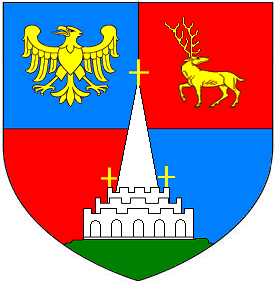
Arms of Templer (Note: Arms as depicted in a 1794 stained glass image in Shute Church of the arms of George Templer of Shapwick. These which differ in several details from the official grant of 1765 registered in the College of Arms: Quarterly azure and gules, on a mount in base vert the perspective of an antique temple argent of three stories, each embattled; from the second battlement two steeples, [sic] and from the top, one, each ending in a cross sable [sic] on the pinnacle; in the first quarter an eagle displayed; in the second a stag trippant regardant or.)

James Templer (1722–1782) of Stover House, Teigngrace, Devon, was a self-made magnate, a civil engineer who made his fortune building dockyards.

== Biography ==
He was born in Exeter of a humble family, the son of Thomas Templer a brazier, and was orphaned young whereupon his elder brother apprenticed him to John Bickley, a carpenter or architect of Exeter. He broke his indenture and set off for India where he made a fortune, either from government building contracts or possibly from dealing in silver bullion, (Note: Extract from www.templerfamily.co.uk: "The log of one of the East India Company ships which was carrying silver bullion suggests that on arrival in Madras the bullion was handed over to a small group consisting of, amongst others, Line and Templer. Another snippet derived from a remote family source is that James Templer and his partners were actually trading in Mexican silver dollars, but why and how they came by the dollars is not explained. However, there are two other possibly completely irrelevant facts worth noting. The first is that adulterated silver became a problem in India, and secondly that James's father and elder brother were both 'braziers', i.e. brass craftsmen, so James would have had some knowledge of foundries and metallurgy. In a printed book of the Madras Record Office Extracts to be found in the Society of Genealogists Library, there is evidence that he was engaged in transactions, legalised by the Madras Mint, in connection with exchanging old and new Mexican silver. In view of James' young age, it seems likely that this was the main basis of his later fortune rather than the building of docks.") before returning to England aged 23. He settled at Rotherhithe, Kent, where he obtained a government contract to re-build the dockyard with his partners John Line and Thomas Parlby (1727–1802), whose sister Mary Parlby became his wife.

In about 1760 he and his partners obtained the contract to rebuild Plymouth docks, for which he used granite from Haytor, and moved to Devon. Templer and Parlby also built the Royal Marine Barracks, Stonehouse, Plymouth between 1779 and 1785. In 1763 he obtained a grant of arms from the College of Arms. He adopted the Latin motto Nihil Sine Labore ("nothing without work").

In 1765 he purchased the estate of Stover, Teigngrace where he built Stover House, probably to his own design. He also acquired other properties including:

- Acton House, Middlesex, near London, which he acquired in 1770 from Capt. Charles Burton and was from then on his business headquarters. It was sold in 1786 by his son and heir to James Stratton, and demolished in 1904.
- Demesne lands of Somerhill House, Tonbridge, Kent, of about 1,200 acres, which he acquired from Edward Whatmore of Salisbury, and which descended to his son Rev. John Templer.
- Two houses in Parliament Street, Westminster
- Shares in the Canal from Tunbridge to Maidstone in Kent, as mentioned in his will.

Templer's Estate Act 1783
- Act of Parliament
- Parliament of Great Britain
- Long title: An Act for vesting such Parts of the Real Estates of James Templer Esquire deceased, as lie in the Counties of Hants, Wilts, and Dorset, in Trustees, to be sold, and for laying out the Money arising by such Sale, in the Purchase of other Lands, to be settled to the Uses, and for the Purposes therein mentioned.
- Citation: 23 Geo. 3. c. 32 Pr.
- Territorial extent: Great Britain

Dates
- Royal assent: 24 June 1783
- Commencement: 5 December 1782 (Note: Start of session.)

Status: Current legislation

- Reversion expectant on the death of Lady Elizabeth [sic] (Note: His wife was Lady Sarah Archer (died 1801); a third share of a man's estate was from mediaeval times the standard dower allowed to a widow as a life interest following her husband's death) Archer of one third of the Hale Park estate in Hampshire, comprising lands in Hampshire, Wiltshire and Dorset, purchased from Andrew Archer, 2nd Baron Archer (1736–78) in 1776, before division in total 459 hectares. In 1783, shortly after his death, James Templer's heirs obtained a private act of Parliament, Templer's Estate Act 1783 (23 Geo. 3. c. 32 Pr.), to allow them to break the trust established by his will, in order to sell this reversion and to invest the proceeds in lands more conveniently situated in Devon.

His grandson George Templer overspent his resources and was forced to sell most of the family's considerable estates to Edward St Maur, 11th Duke of Somerset, in 1829.

== Marriage and children ==
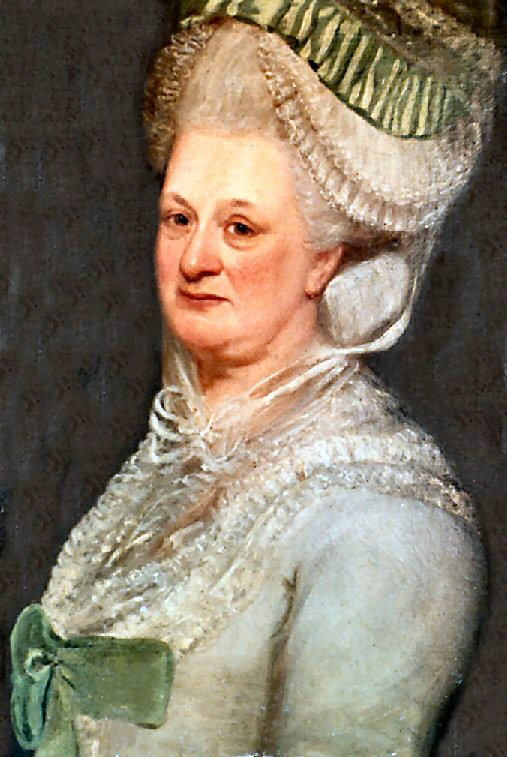
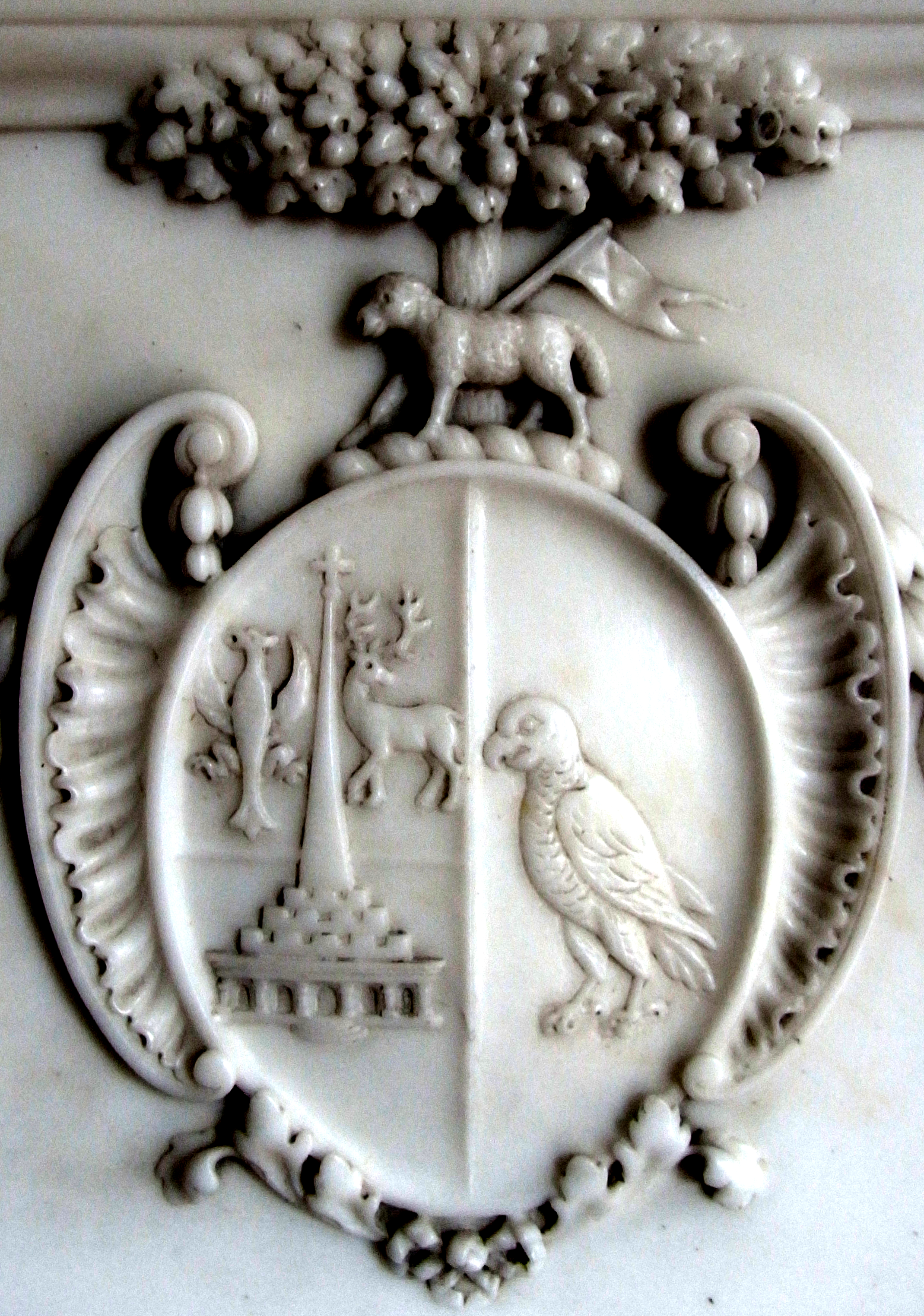
Mary Parlby (1725–1784), portrait by unknown artist; right: Arms of Templer impaling Parlby (Argent, a parrot vert), sculpted in relief on marble chimneypiece in entrance hall of Stover House, representing the marriage of James Templer to Mary Parlby, with Templer crest above

Templer married Mary Parlby (1725–1784), the sister of his business partner Thomas Parlby (1727–1802) and daughter of John Parlby of Chatham, Kent. They had seven children:

- James Templer (1748–1813), eldest son and heir, who built the Stover Canal in 1792 to transport clay along the Teign Estuary from the Bovey Basin to the port of Teignmouth.
- Rev. John Templer (1751–1832), 2nd son, Rector of Teigngrace, who in 1778 married Jane Shubrick (1751–1813), the widow of John Line (died 1777) of Lindridge House, Sheriff of Devon in 1774.
- William Templer (1753–1778), 3rd son, died aged 25 at Portsmouth, buried at Teigngrace.
- George Templer (1755–1819), MP, of Shapwick in Somerset.
- Lt-Col. Henry Line Templer (1765–1818), 10th Lt Dragoons and one of the Prince Regent's household.
- Charles Beckford Templer (1771–1786), youngest son, who at the age of 15 drowned in the notorious shipwreck of the Halsewell on the Dorset coast, whilst sailing to Bengal.
- Anne Templer (1758–1832), wife of Sir John de la Pole, 6th Baronet (1757–1799) of Shute in Devon, Member of Parliament for West Looe.

== Death and burial ==
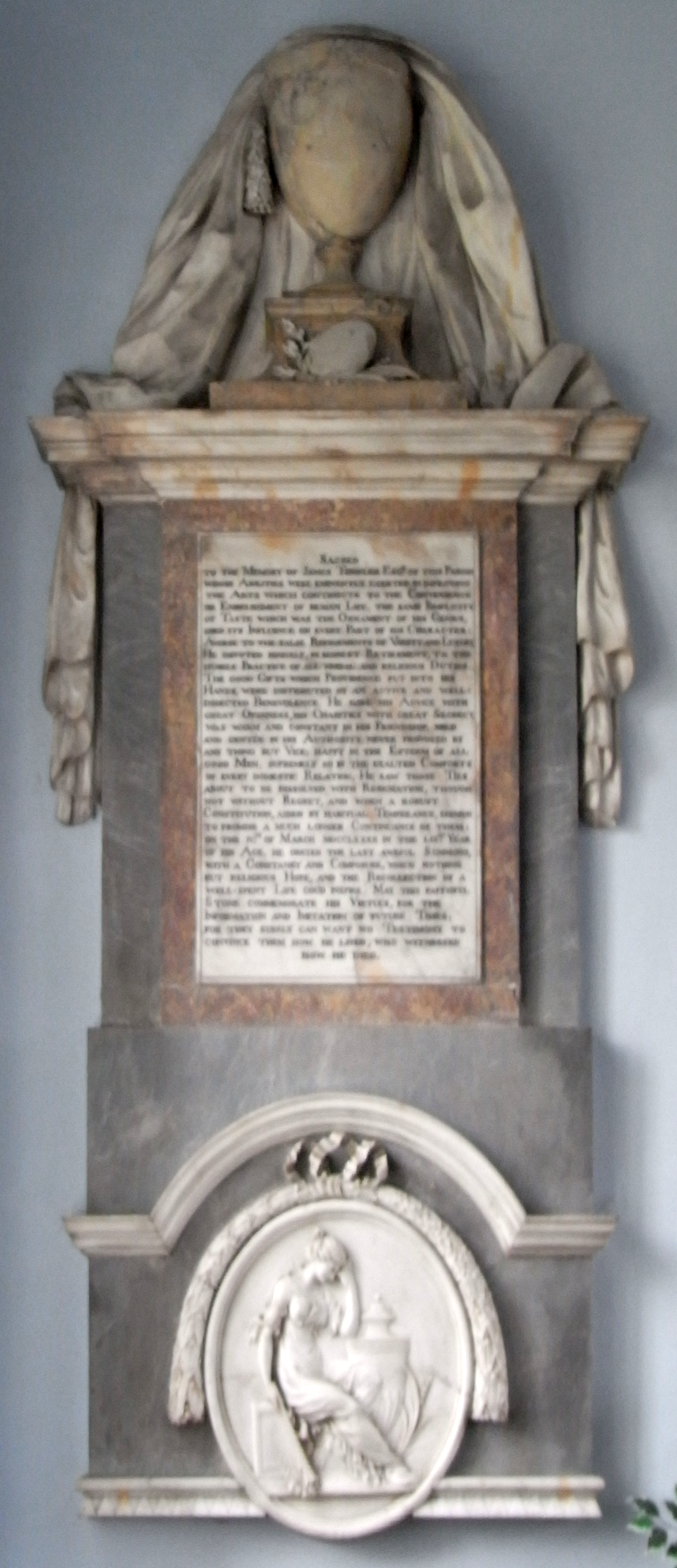
James Templer's mural monument in Teigngrace Church

He died in 1782 and is commemorated by a mural monument in Teigngrace Church (see photo, right), as is his wife. The church was also rebuilt in 1787 by three of his sons in memory of their parents. Pevsner thought highly of this family stating: "The Templers were people of taste, as is clear from the building and their monuments".

== Sources ==
- Burke's Genealogical and Heraldic History of the Landed Gentry, 15th Edition, ed. Pirie-Gordon, H., London, 1937, p. 2217, pedigree of Templer late of Lindridge
- Cherry, Bridget; Pevsner, Nikolaus (1989). The Buildings of England: Devon (second ed.). Penguin Books. ISBN 0-14-071050-7.
- www.templerfamily.co.uk
