= Ilford (disambiguation) =

Ilford is a town in Greater London, England.

Ilford may also refer to:

== Places ==
=== Australia ===
- Ilford, New South Wales, a small town in Australia

=== Canada ===
- Ilford, Manitoba, a community in the Canadian province of Manitoba

=== United Kingdom ===
- Ilford in Redbridge, London
  - Ilford (UK Parliament constituency), former constituency
  - Ilford North (UK Parliament constituency)
  - Ilford South (UK Parliament constituency)
  - Ilford (ward), former Redbridge London Borough Council electoral ward
  - Municipal Borough of Ilford, a historic district in Essex, England
- Iford, East Sussex, a village and civil parish in the Lewes District of East Sussex
- Ilford, Somerset, a hamlet in the civil parish of Ilton in Somerset
- Little Ilford in Newham, London
- Ilford Road station on the Tyne and Wear Metro
- Ilford Park Polish Home in Devon

== Other uses ==
- Geoffrey Hutchinson, Baron Ilford, a British soldier, a barrister and Conservative Party politician
- Ilford Photo, a photographic company

== See also ==
- Iford (disambiguation)
