= James Templer (canal builder) =

British canal builder

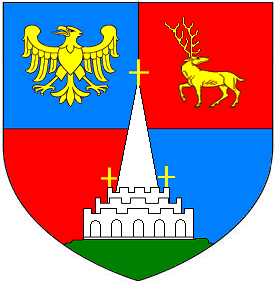
Arms of Templer (Note: Arms as depicted in a 1794 stained glass image in Shute Church of the arms of George Templer of Shapwick. These differ in several details from the official grant of 1765 registered in the College of Arms: Quarterly azure and gules, on a mount in base vert the perspective of an antique temple argent of three stories, each embattled; from the second battlement two steeples, [sic] and from the top, one, each ending in a cross sable [sic] on the pinnacle; in the first quarter an eagle displayed; in the second a stag trippant regardant or.)

James Templer (1748–1813) of Stover House, Teigngrace, Devon, was a Devon landowner and the builder of the Stover Canal.

== Biography ==
He was the eldest son and heir of James Templer (1722–1782), of Stover House, Teigngrace, Devon, a self-made magnate who had made his fortune building dockyards.

Map showing some relevant features

Templer was a Master in the Crown Office at London. He inherited the Stover estate in 1782, and began construction of a new church at Teigngrace, built in the local granite from quarries at Hay Tor. This was completed in 1787, and his brother Rev. John Templer (1751–1832) of Lindridge House was the first rector of the church. The mining of ball clay in the area had begun to rapidly expand, and from 1790 Templer built the Stover Canal at his own expense to transport clay to cellars on the banks of the River Teign, for onward transportation by barge down the river estuary to the port of Teignmouth on the coast.

In 1776 he married Mary Buller (1749–1829), third daughter of James Buller (1717–1765) of Downes, Crediton, Member of Parliament for East Looe in Cornwall (1741–7) and for the County of Cornwall (1748–1765). They had children, including:

- George Templer (1781–1843), son and heir, who inherited the Stover estate and built the Haytor Granite Tramway.
- Charlotte Frances Templer (d. 1875), who married twice, firstly in 1811 to Capt. Richard Dalling Dunn (1767–1813), Royal Navy, whose mural monument survives in Teigngrace Church. Her second marriage was in 1819 to Capt. Charles Richard Acland (1793–1828), Royal Navy, third son of Sir Thomas Dyke Acland, 9th Baronet (1752–1794), of Killerton House in Devon. He died from blackwater fever off Simondstown, South Africa. The marriage was without progeny.
- Francis James Templer (1791–1854), youngest son, who served as the ninth Treasurer of Ceylon from 1 November 1843 to October 1854.

Templer died aged 65 on 21 June 1813, and is commemorated by a Coade stone monument in Teigngrace church.

== Sources ==
- Ewans, M.C. (1966). The Haytor Granite Tramway and Stover Canal. Newton Abbot: David & Charles.
