= Edward St Maur, 11th Duke of Somerset =

Duke of Somerset

His Grace The Duke of Somerset KG FRS
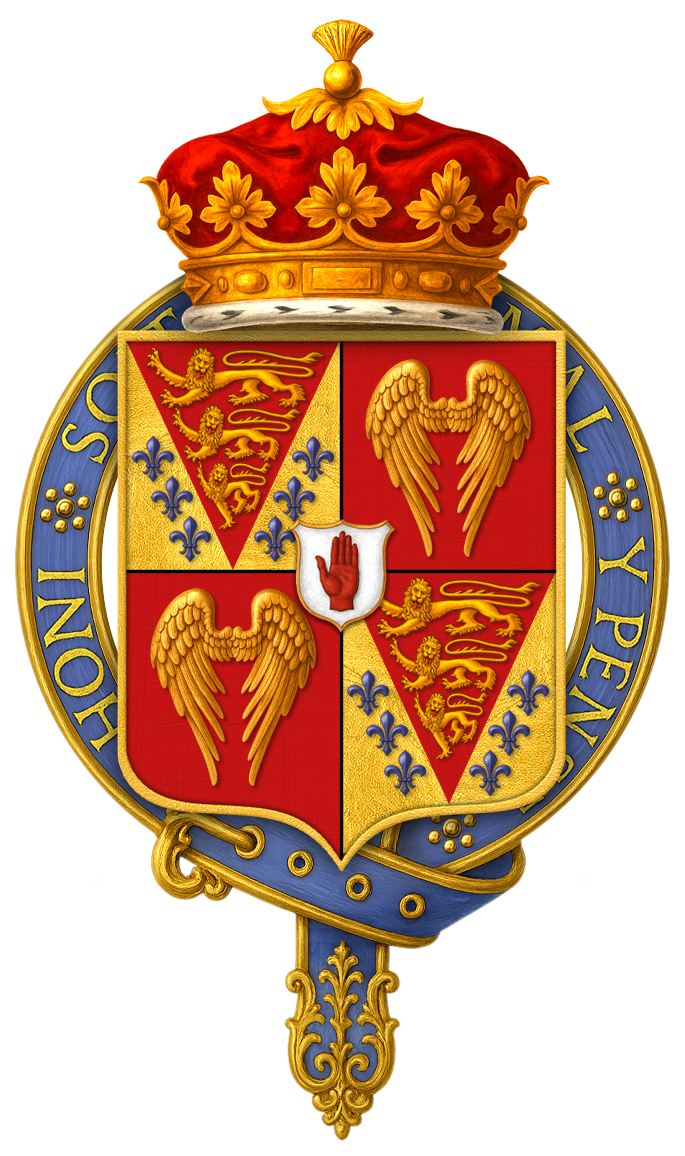
- Garter-encircled arms of Lord Somerset, as displayed on his Garter stall plate in St. George's chapel.

Vice-Admiral of Somerset
- In office 1831–1855
- Preceded by: The Earl of Egmont
- Succeeded by: Vacant

Personal details
- Born: Edward Adolphus Seymour; 24 February 1775 Monkton Farleigh, Wiltshire
- Died: 15 August 1855 (aged 80) Somerset House, London
- Spouse(s): Lady Charlotte Douglas-Hamilton (m. 1800; died 1827) Margaret Shaw-Stewart (m. 1836; died 1855)
- Children: 7
- Parent(s): Webb Seymour, 10th Duke of Somerset; Mary Bonnell

Edward Adolphus St Maur, 11th Duke of Somerset KG FRS (born Seymour; 24 February 1775 – 15 August 1855), styled Lord Seymour until 1793, of Maiden Bradley in Wiltshire and Stover House, Teigngrace, Devon, was a British peer, landowner, astrologer and mathematician.

== Early life ==
Seymour was born at Monkton Farleigh in Wiltshire, the son and heir of Webb Seymour, 10th Duke of Somerset (1718–1793), by his wife Mary Bonnell, daughter of John Bonnell, of Stanton Harcourt, Oxfordshire. He was baptised on 4 April 1775 at Monkton Farleigh, with the name of Edward Seymour, but later changed it to Edward St Maur (between 28 August 1850 and 23 October 1851) in the belief it was the original ancient form of the name. His younger brother, Lord Webb Seymour, was an amateur geologist and Fellow of the Royal Society.

In 1793 he succeeded his father in the dukedom. In 1795, in the company of the Rev. John Henry Michell, he undertook a tour through England, Wales and Scotland, which he recorded in a journal, published in 1845. The tour took him as far as the Isles of Staffa and Iona in the Hebrides.

== Career ==
When the Wiltshire Supplementary Militia was embodied in 1797 he was appointed as its Colonel; it was disbanded in 1799.

He was a gifted mathematician and served as president of the Linnean Society of London from 1834 to 1837 and as president of the Royal Institution from 1826 to 1842. He was also a Fellow of the Royal Society. In 1837, he was made a Knight of the Garter by King William IV. Seymour was also set to serve as the first President of the Astronomical Society of London (later the Royal Astronomical Society), having been unanimously elected to this post at the Society's second public meeting on 29 February 1820. However, he was persuaded to resign the position within days of his election by his friend (and then President of the Royal Society) Joseph Banks, who strongly opposed the establishment of a specialist society for astronomy. He was a patron of the Free Church of England.

=== Properties ===
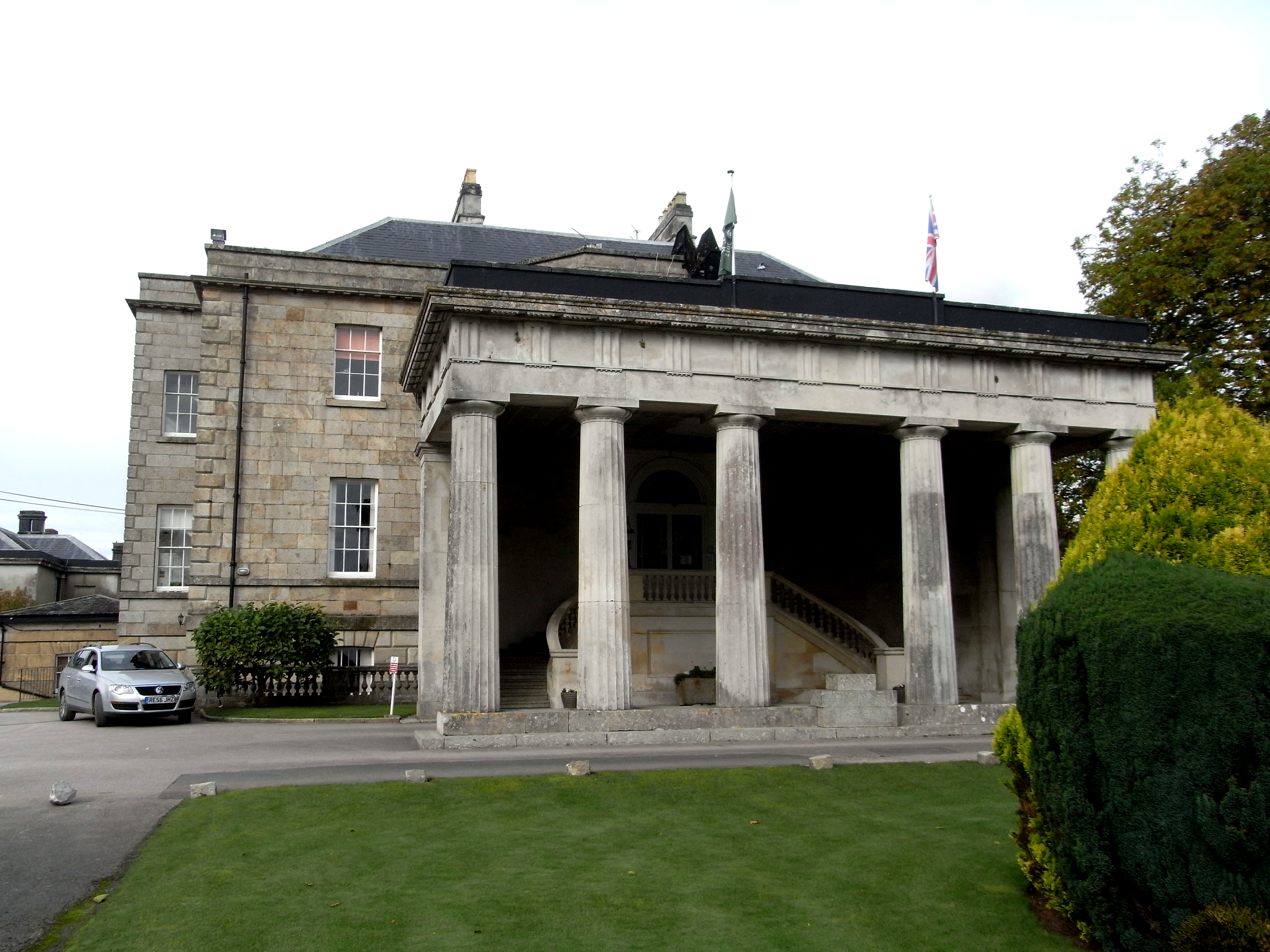
Stover House, showing the dominant porte cochere added by the 11th Duke

In 1808, he purchased a London townhouse on Park Lane which he named Somerset House, and where he spent much of his time. In addition, in 1829 he purchased from George Templer (1781–1843) the Devonshire estate of Stover in the parish of Teigngrace, near Newton Abbot, and made Stover House his principal residence, where he displayed the valuable "Hamilton" art collection brought as her marriage portion by his wife Lady Charlotte Hamilton, a daughter of the 9th Duke of Hamilton. This included paintings by Rubens, Lawrence and Reynolds. The principal seat of the Seymour family had been Maiden Bradley in Wiltshire, but for one more generation it remained Stover. The Stover purchase included the Stover Canal and the Haytor quarries and Haytor Granite Tramway. He added a large porte cochere with Doric columns to Stover House and built a matching entrance lodge.

== Personal life ==
Arms of the Seymour Dukes of Somerset: Quarterly, 1st and 4th: Or, on a pile gules between six fleurs de lys azure three lions of England (special grant to Edward Seymour, 1st Duke of Somerset (c. 1500–1552)); 2nd and 3rd: Gules, two wings conjoined in lure or (Seymour)

Somerset married twice, firstly on 24 June 1800 to Lady Charlotte Douglas-Hamilton (1772–1827), a daughter of Archibald Hamilton, 9th Duke of Hamilton. Before her death at Somerset House in London on 10 June 1827, they were the parents of seven children:

- Edward Seymour, 12th Duke of Somerset (1804–1885), who married Georgiana Sheridan, the third daughter of Thomas Sheridan and his wife, the novelist Caroline Callander.
- Archibald St Maur, 13th Duke of Somerset (1810–1891), who succeeded his elder brother in the dukedom as the 12th Duke's two sons predeceased him; he died unmarried and childless.
- Algernon St. Maur, 14th Duke of Somerset (1813–1894), who married Horatia Isabella Harriet Morier, daughter of diplomat John Philip Morier, in 1845.
- Lady Charlotte Jane Seymour (1803–1889), who married William Blount, of Orelton, Herefordshire, in 1839.
- Lady Jane Wilhelmina Seymour
- Lady Anna Maria Jane Seymour (d. 1873), who married William Tollemache, son of Hon. Charles Manners Tollemache (third son of the 7th Countess of Dysart) and Gertrude Florinda Gardiner, in 1838.
- Lady Henrietta Seymour

Following his first wife's death in 1827 he remarried on 28 July 1836 at Marylebone, Portland Place, London, to Margaret Shaw-Stewart, daughter of Sir Michael Shaw-Stewart, 5th Baronet of Blackhall, Renfrewshire, and the former Catherine Maxwell (a daughter of Sir William Maxwell, 3rd Baronet). The marriage was childless.

Somerset died at Somerset House in London, in August 1855, aged 80, and was buried at Kensal Green Cemetery, London. Margaret, his second wife, died at Somerset House on 18 July 1880, and was deposited in the mausoleum with her husband. He was succeeded by his eldest son, Edward, who was also heir of Stover House and who, in his relatives' opinion, married beneath his social station. Upon the 12th Duke's death, despite leaving three married daughters, the dukedom passed by law to his heir male, his younger brother, with whom he had developed an enmity after the latter called his wife, Georgiana Sheridan, a "low-bred greedy beggar woman, whose sole object was to get her hands on the property and leave it away from the direct heirs". The 12th Duke bequeathed Stover and its priceless contents, including the Hamilton treasures, in trust for his illegitimate grandson Harold St. Maur, which caused uproar on the part of his younger brother the 13th Duke, who considered the treasures to be family heirlooms which should have passed to him. He inherited Maiden Bradley House, presumably under an entail, but almost entirely stripped of its contents.

== Ancestry ==
Ancestors of Edward St Maur, 11th Duke of Somerset

Sir Edward Seymour, 4th Baronet
Sir Edward Seymour, 5th Baronet
Margaret Wale
Edward Seymour, 8th Duke of Somerset
Sir Francis Popham
Laetitia Popham
Helena/Eleanor Rogers
Webb Seymour, 10th Duke of Somerset
Daniel Webb
Mary Webb
John Somner
Elizabeth Somner
Edward Adolphus St Maur, 11th Duke of Somerset
Andrew Bonnell
John Bonnell
Anna Maria/Mary Anne Bonnell

Honorary titles
Vacant Title last held by The Earl of Egmont	Vice-Admiral of Somerset; 1831–1855	Vacant
Peerage of England
Preceded by Webb Seymour	Duke of Somerset; 1793–1855	Succeeded by Edward Seymour
