= Iford =

Iford may refer to

- Iford, Dorset, a suburb of Bournemouth, England
- Iford, East Sussex, a village in Lewes District, East Sussex, England
- Iford Manor, a manor house in Wiltshire, England

== See also ==
- Ilford (disambiguation)
