= Stover, Teigngrace =

Historic estate in Devon, England

Stover
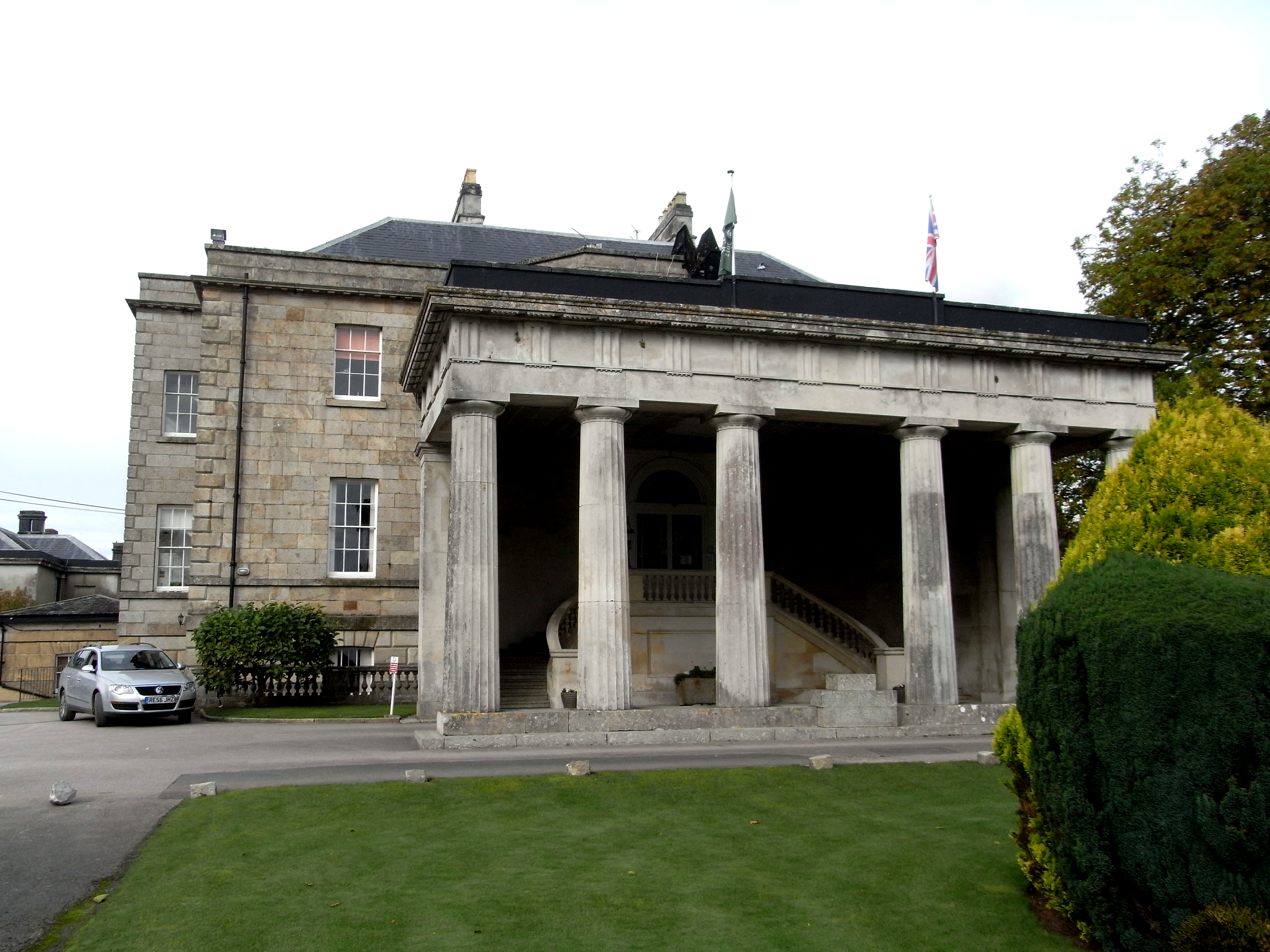

- Location within Devon
- 50.5560°N 3.6411°W
- Location: Teigngrace
- OS grid reference: SX 83846 74204

History
- Built: 1776-1780
- Built for: James Templer

Listed Building – Grade II*
- Designated: 1986
- Reference no.: 1334127

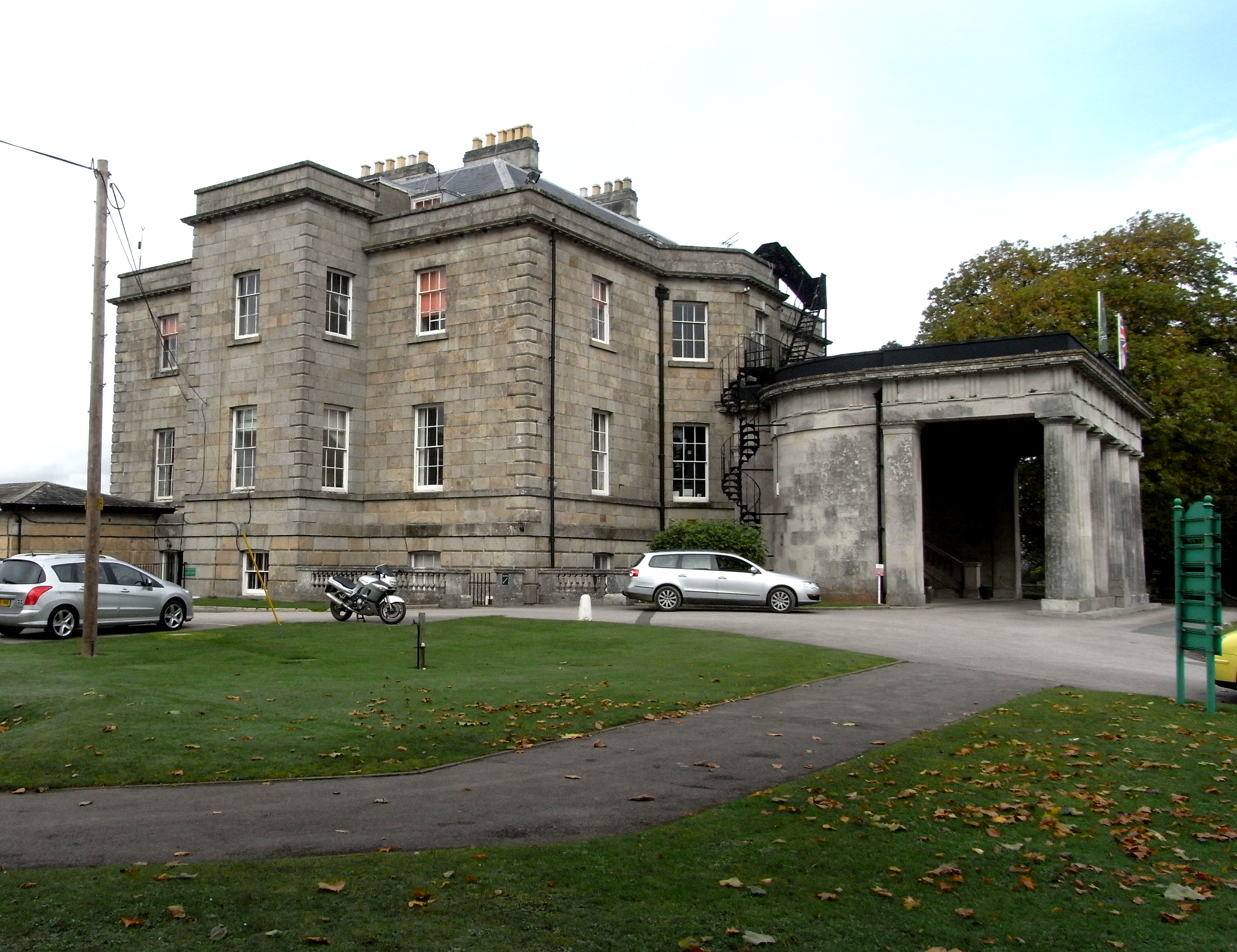
West front of Stover House, showing the porte-cochere of c.1830 on the right

Stover is a historic estate in the parish of Teigngrace, about halfway between the towns of Newton Abbot and Bovey Tracey in South Devon, England. It was bought by James Templer (1722–1782) in 1765 and passed through three generations of that family before being bought by Edward St Maur, 11th Duke of Somerset in 1829.

The Georgian mansion, sometimes called Stover House, was built by the first James Templer. It is a Grade II* listed building. Since 1932 the house and part of the former estate have been occupied by a private school.

114 acres of the former estate situated south of the A38 now forms Stover Country Park, a nature reserve owned and managed by Devon County Council and open to the public.

== History ==
=== Templer family ===
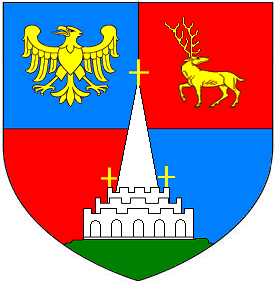
Arms of the Templer family (Note: Blazoned as Quarterly azure and gules, the perspective of an antique temple argent on the pinnacle and exterior battlements a cross or; in the first quarter an eagle displayed in the second quarter a stag trippant reguardant both of the last.)

James Templer (1722–1782) was born in Exeter, the son of a tradesman. He made a fortune in India and married Mary Parlby, the sister of his business partner Thomas Parlby in 1747. In 1765 he purchased the estate of Stover which included a ruinous house known as Stoford Lodge. (Note: According to Ewans. Other sources refer to it as "Stover Lodge".) Between 1776 and 1780 he built a new house, probably to his own design, on an elevated site about half a mile from the ruins. The house, named Stover House or Stover Lodge, (Note: Numerous early sources refer to James Templer's new building as "Stover Lodge".) was constructed of granite from the quarries at Haytor. A stable block in Italian Baroque style, dated 'J.T. Built 1779', is north of the house.

His eldest son and heir, James Templer (1748–1813), built the Stover Canal in 1792. In 1786, together with his two brothers, he rebuilt St Peter and St Paul's Church, the parish church of Teigngrace, as a memorial to his parents, which contains many mural monuments to the Templer family. He married Mary Buller, the third daughter of James Buller.

George Templer (1781–1843) inherited the Stover estate on his father's death. He built the Haytor Granite Tramway to ease the carriage of granite from his quarries to the canal. During his tenure, George founded the South Devon Hunt, with kennels based at Stover. However, he was not a successful businessman and in 1829 was forced to sell Stover House, the canal, the tramway and most of the rest of the family's considerable estates to Edward St Maur, 11th Duke of Somerset.

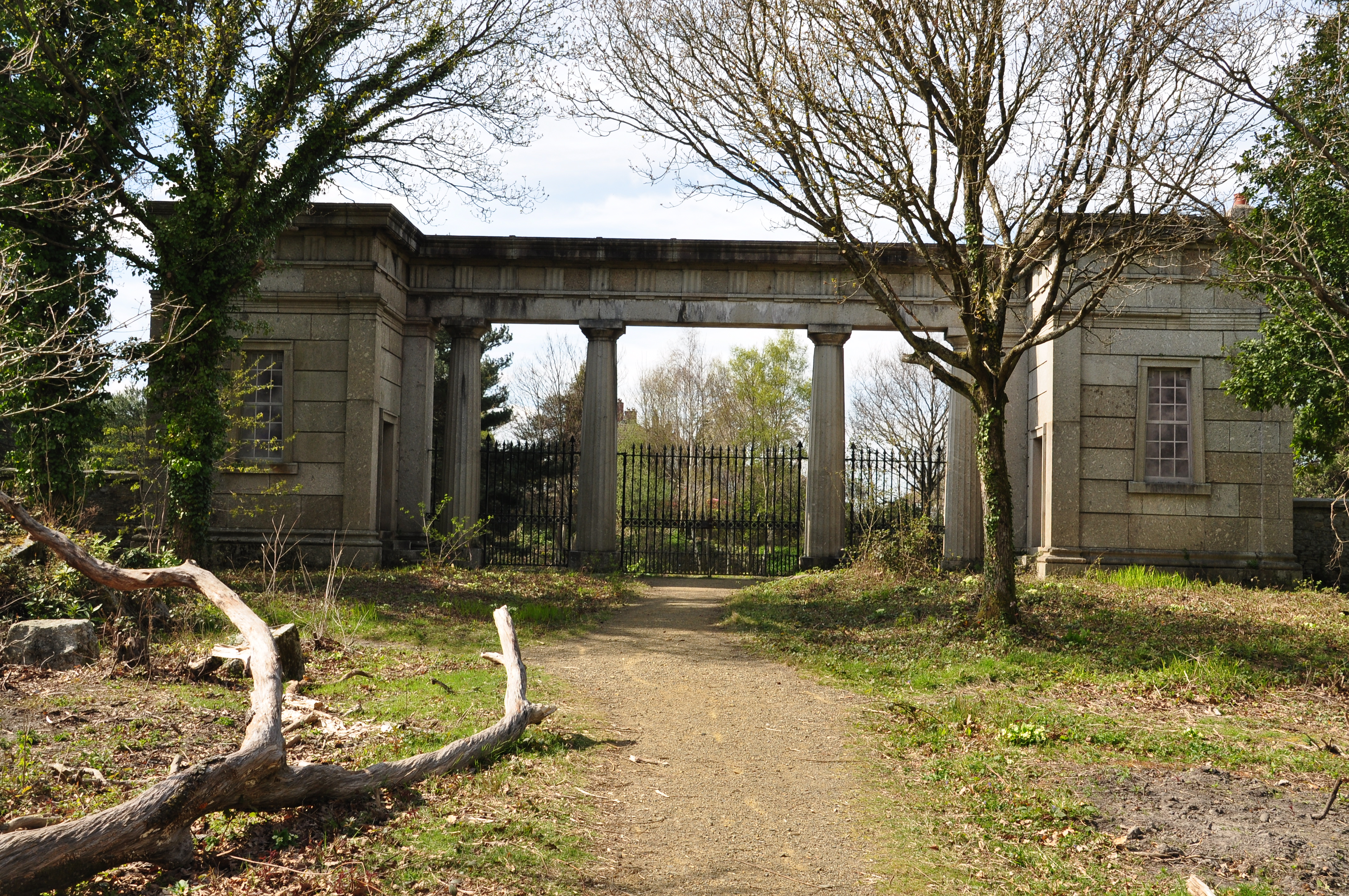
The entrance gate (rear view)

=== Seymour family ===
Edward St Maur, 11th Duke of Somerset (1775–1855) purchased Stover in 1829. His ancestor Lord Edward Seymour (died 1593) had acquired the feudal barony of Berry Pomeroy, the caput of which was Berry Pomeroy Castle, also in south Devon. In around 1830 a large porte-cochere of Portland stone was added to the south face of Stover House; it contains under a classical portico of Doric columns a curved double flight of balustraded stairs. The grand entrance gate to the estate has Doric columns and was probably built at the same time as the porte-cochere, to which it is similar in style. Today it is unused and stands at the side of the busy A38 main road. Another major addition of around 1830 was the Clock House, a large neoclassical stable block built around a quadrangle to the west of the main house: it replaced the Templer stables to the north. Before 1834, St Maur had consulted with James Veitch about making improvements to the grounds. In the garden today are a small classical temple and a grotto. The principal seat of the Seymour family had been Maiden Bradley in Wiltshire, but it now became Stover, and here the Duke housed his valuable "Hamilton" art collection that had been brought to the family by his wife Lady Charlotte Hamilton, a daughter of the 9th Duke of Hamilton, as her marriage portion. The collection included paintings by Rubens, Lawrence and Reynolds.

Edward Seymour, 12th Duke of Somerset (1804–1885), KG, son and heir, served as First Lord of the Admiralty, Member of Parliament for Okehampton and for Totnes, and as Lord Lieutenant of Devon. He married Georgiana Sheridan, a woman considered by his relatives to be beneath his social station. Since he was predeceased by both his sons, the dukedom passed under law to his younger brother Archibald Seymour, 13th Duke of Somerset, who had described his elder brother's wife as a "low-bred greedy beggar woman, whose sole object was to get her hands on the property and leave it away from the direct heirs". Due to this family rift, the 12th Duke deprived him of as many material possessions as possible and bequeathed Stover and its priceless contents, including the Hamilton treasures, in trust for his illegitimate grandson Harold St Maur, which caused uproar on the part of the 13th Duke, who considered the treasures to be family heirlooms which should have passed to him. The trustee was the 12th Duke's son-in-law Lord Henry Thynne, son of the Marquess of Bath, who sold much of the Stover estate and all of the Hamilton treasures while the beneficiaries were still under-age.

Harold St. Maur (1869–1927), of Horton, Chipping Sodbury, Gloucestershire, was the eldest but illegitimate son of Edward Seymour, Earl St Maur (1835–1869), son and heir apparent of the 12th Duke, whom he predeceased. Harold inherited Stover in 1885 on the death of his grandfather the 12th Duke. He was Master of the South Devon Foxhounds for many years and in 1894 created a golf course on the Stover estate, now the Stover Golf Club. He was the Seymour family historian and author of Annals of the Seymours (1902). (Note: St Maur, Harold, Annals of the Seymours, Being a History of the Seymour Family, From Early Times to Within a Few Years of the Present, London, 1902)

== 20th and 21st centuries ==
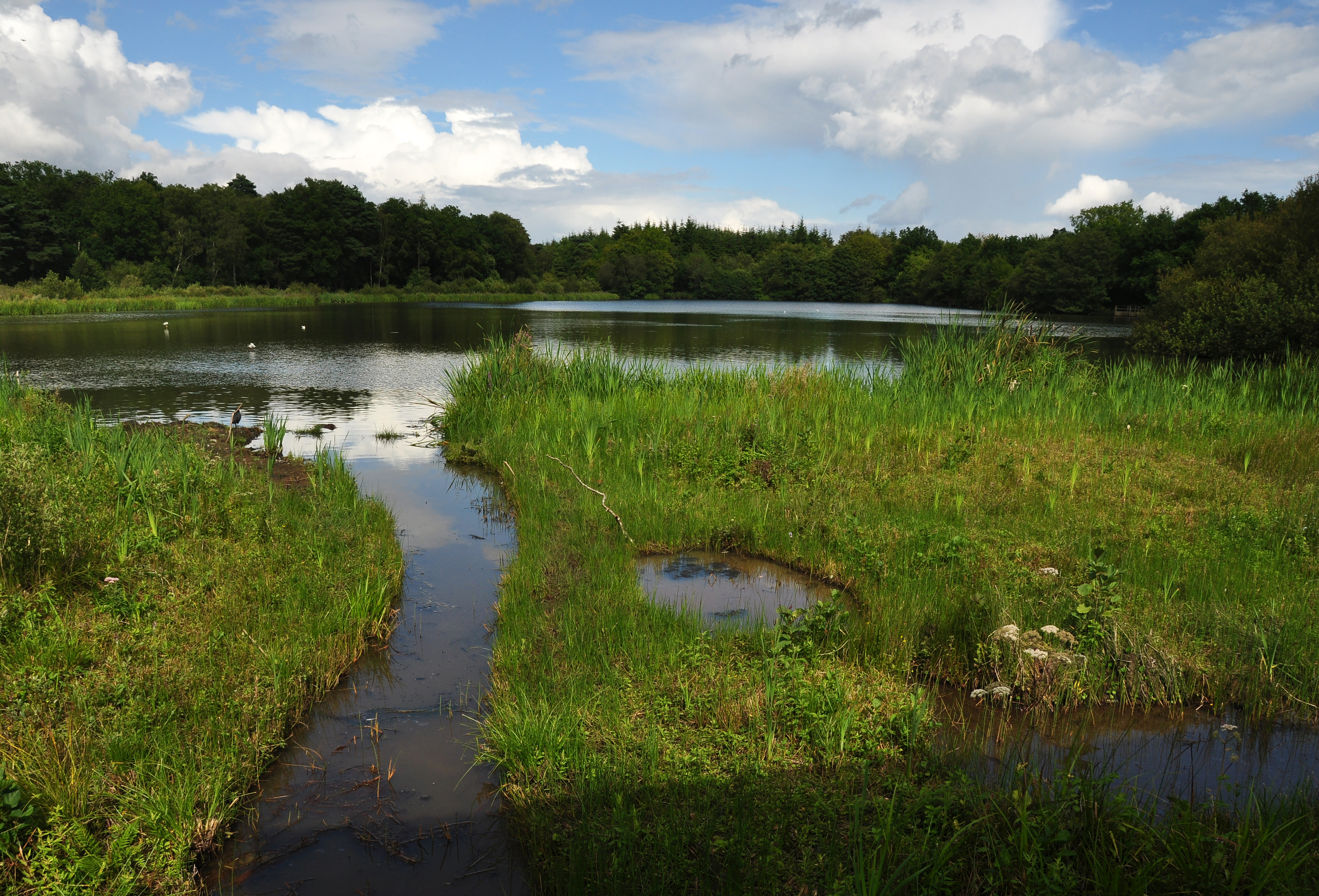
Stover Lake, an ornamental lake on the Stover estate which also serves to drain the lower lying areas

At the start of World War I, Stover House was opened as a hospital for injured soldiers with Mrs St Maur, being a former nurse, acting as Lady Superintendent; but it closed just a year later. Harold St. Maur moved to Kenya where he died in 1927, leaving three sons.

In 1932, Major Richard St. Maur leased Stover House and part of the grounds to Stover Girls' School, which had previously occupied premises in College Road in Newton Abbot. As of 2022, the school is coeducational and still occupies the site. The land immediately south of the school was the site of the 1952 Royal Show. The house was designated a Grade II* listed building in 1986, and several other buildings and structures on the site are also listed.

From the time of the first James Templer, many trees were planted around the estate. This continued into the 20th century, when the Forestry Commission acquired the woodland around Stover Lake for commercial timber production. In 1979 about 114 acres (46 ha) of the land, comprising woodland, heathland, grassland, marsh and Stover Lake, was sold to Devon County Council for use as a country park, now known as Stover Country Park, and a Site of Special Scientific Interest. Since 1995, the parkland and gardens have been Grade II listed in the National Register of Historic Parks and Gardens.

The Templer Way is an 18-mile-long public footpath and cycleway between Haytor on Dartmoor and Teignmouth on the south coast, which follows the route of the Haytor Granite Tramway and the Stover Canal, both built by the Templer family of Stover for the purpose of exporting granite quarried on Dartmoor.

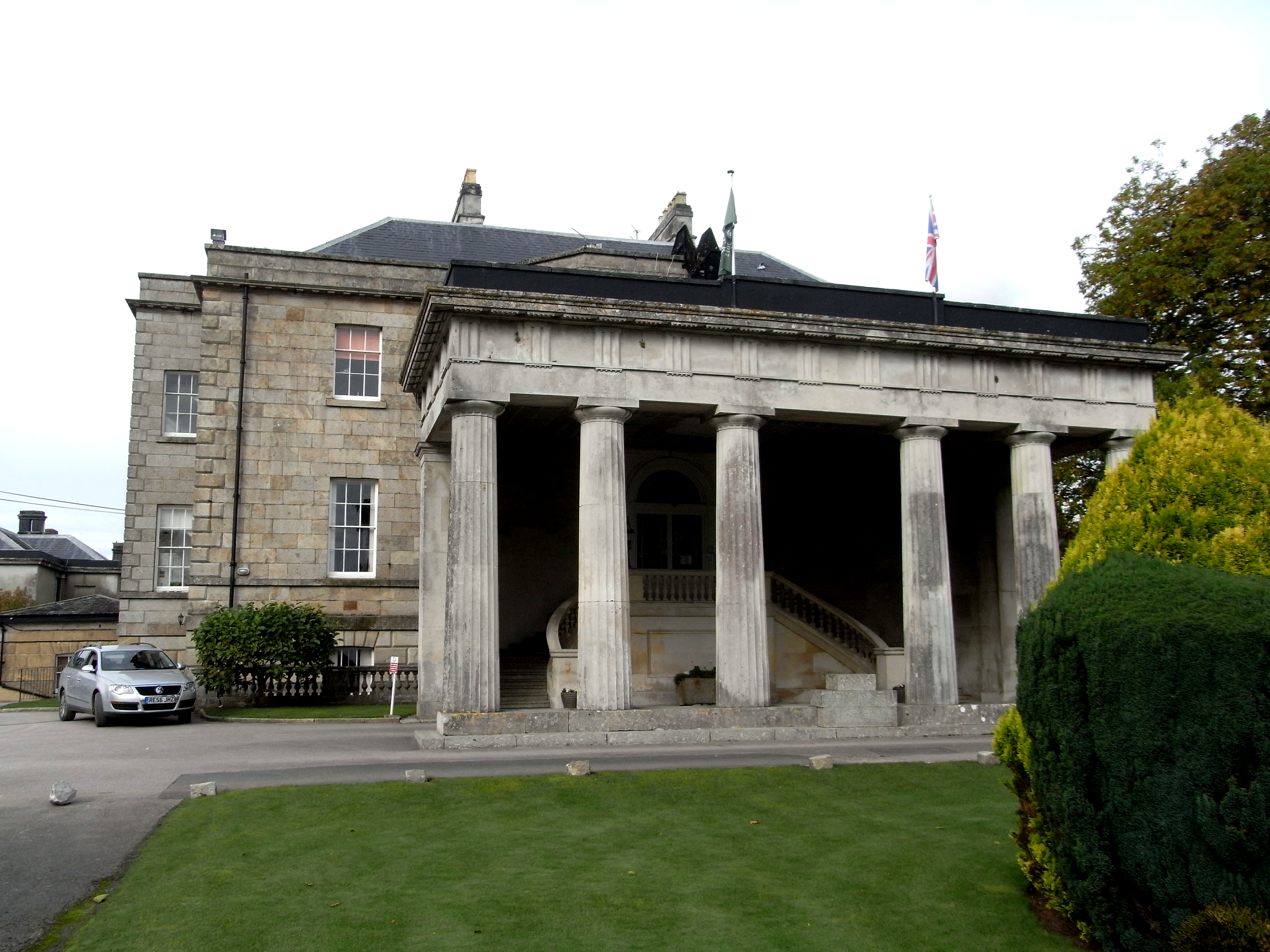
Stover House, south front, now mostly obscured by the porte-cochere

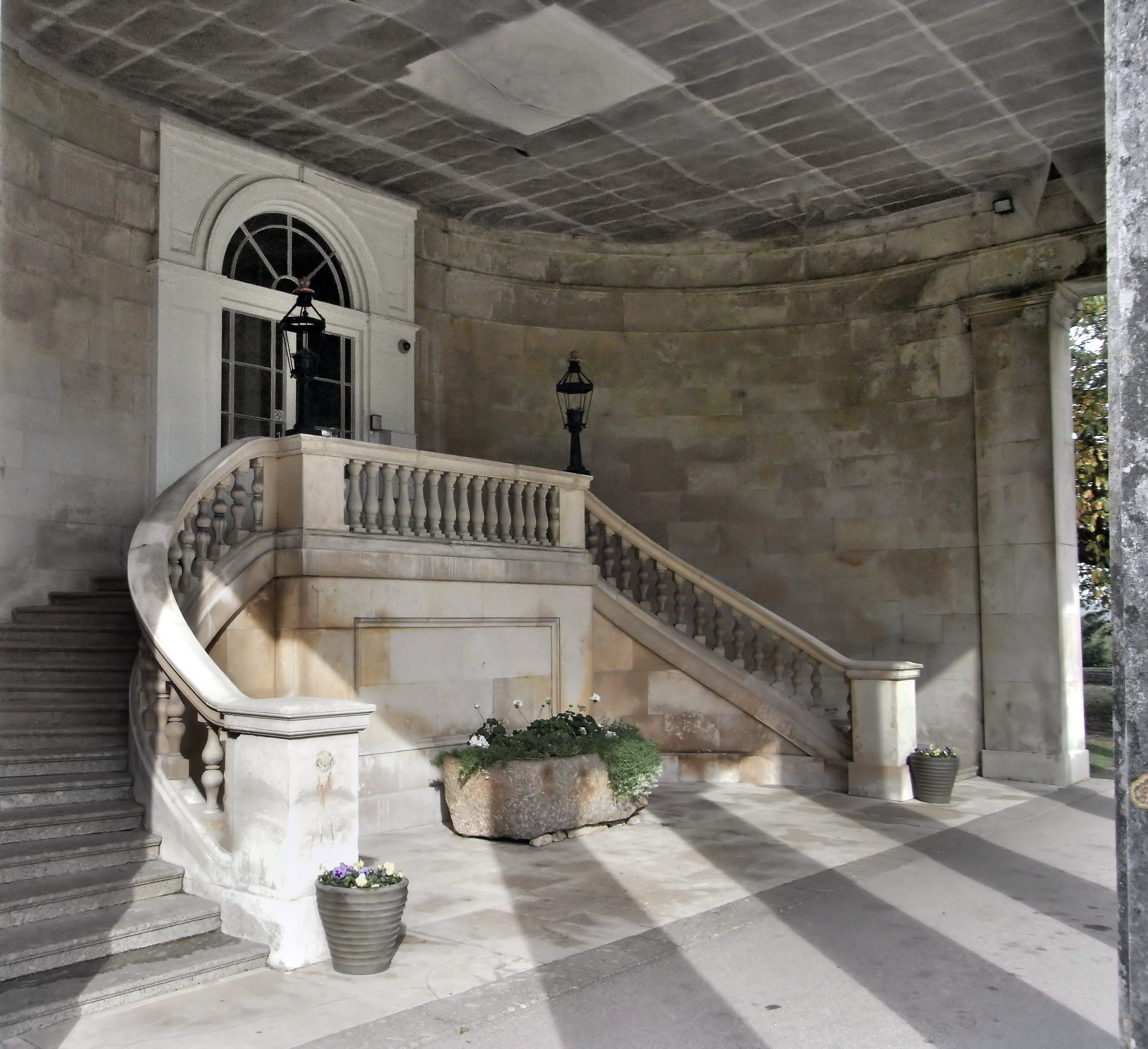
The staircase within the porte-cochere

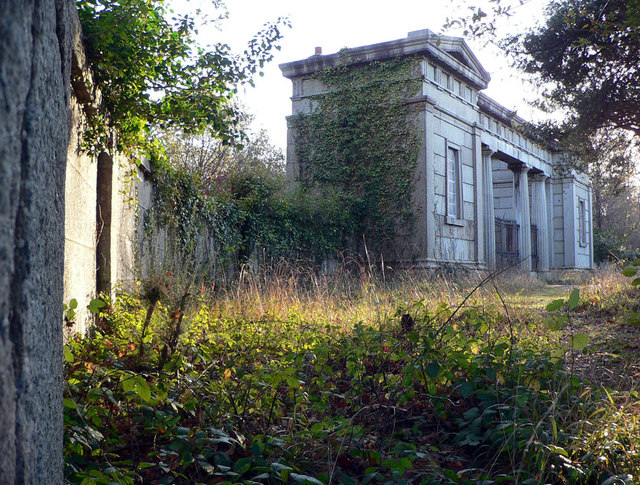
The gatehouse from the outside

== Sources ==
- Cherry, Bridget; Pevsner, Nikolaus (1989). The Buildings of England: Devon (second ed.). London: Penguin Books. ISBN 0-14-071050-7.
- Ewans, M. C. (1966). The Haytor Granite Tramway and Stover Canal. Newton Abbot: David & Charles.
- Masters, Brian, The Dukes: Origin, Ennoblement and History of 26 Families, 1980. Google Books
- Stover. The Story of a School. Stover School. 1982. ISBN 0-907854-01-X.
