= Haytor Granite Tramway =

Horse-drawn tramway built to convey granite (1820-1858)

Coordinates: 50°35′11″N 3°45′56″W

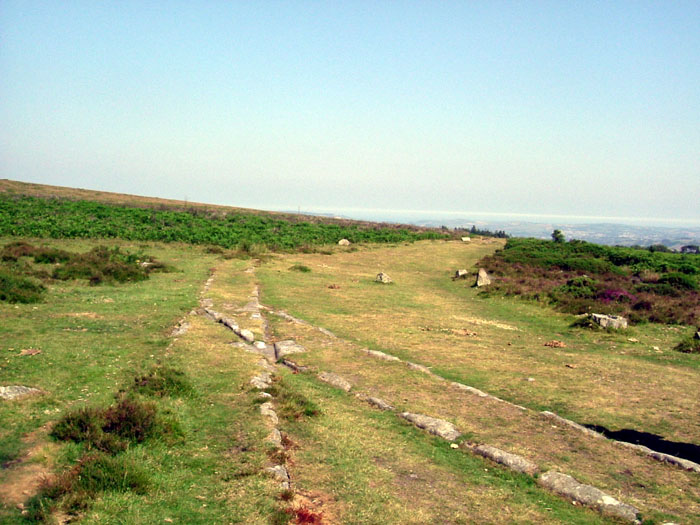
- A section of the track as it appeared in 2005

Overview
- Dates of operation: 1820–1858
- Successor: Abandoned

Technical
- Track gauge: 4 ft 3 in (1,295 mm)
- Length: 10 miles (16 km)

The Haytor Granite Tramway (also called Heytor) was a tramway built to convey granite from Haytor Down, Dartmoor, Devon to the Stover Canal. It was very unusual in that the track was formed of granite sections, shaped to guide the wheels of horse-drawn wagons.

It was built in 1820; the granite was in demand in the developing cities of England as masonry to construct public buildings and bridges. In 1850 the quarries employed about 100 men but by 1858 they had closed due to the availability of cheaper Cornish granite.

The Haytor rocks and quarries are protected from development and disturbance as a Site of Special Scientific Interest.

== Operation and purpose ==
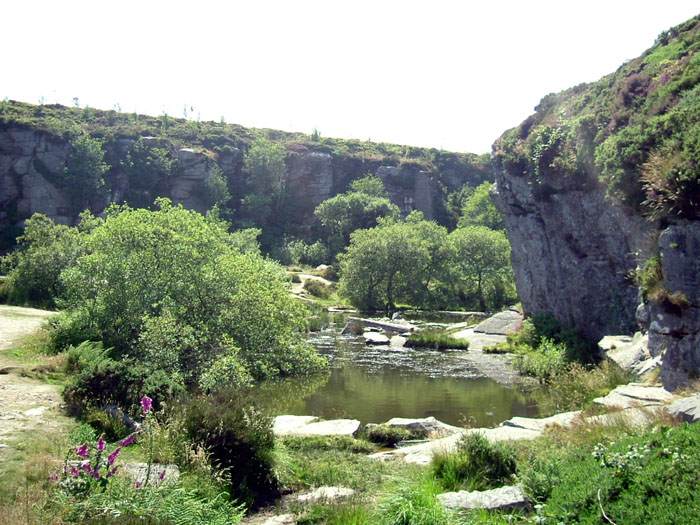
Haytor quarry today

The granite from the quarries near Haytor Rock was much in demand for construction work in the cities of England, but in an era when railways and reliable roads had not yet been developed, the transport of this heavy and bulky commodity was a significant problem. Coastal shipping was a practicable transport medium, and the Stover Canal was available from Ventiford to the Teign Navigation.

The Haytor Tramway was constructed to carry the granite the 10 miles (16 km) to the canal, which involved a falling vertical interval of 1,300 feet (400 m) to the basin of the Stover Canal. Its form was a close relative of a plateway, where longitudinal L-shaped metal plates were used to support and guide the wheels of wagons. In the Haytor case, the "plates" were cut from granite blocks. The blocks were from 4 feet (1.2 m) to 8 feet (2.4 m) long and about 1 foot (0.30 m) square. The outer surface of the blocks was cut away to make the track leaving an upstand which guided the wheels of the wagons. The track was laid with the upstand inside the wheels, and the gauge is measured across the two faces of the upstand. The track surface averaged 4 inches (100 mm) in width but could be up to 6 inches (150 mm). As the wagons had plain wheels without flanges, they could be manoeuvred at the terminals without the need for sidings and points.

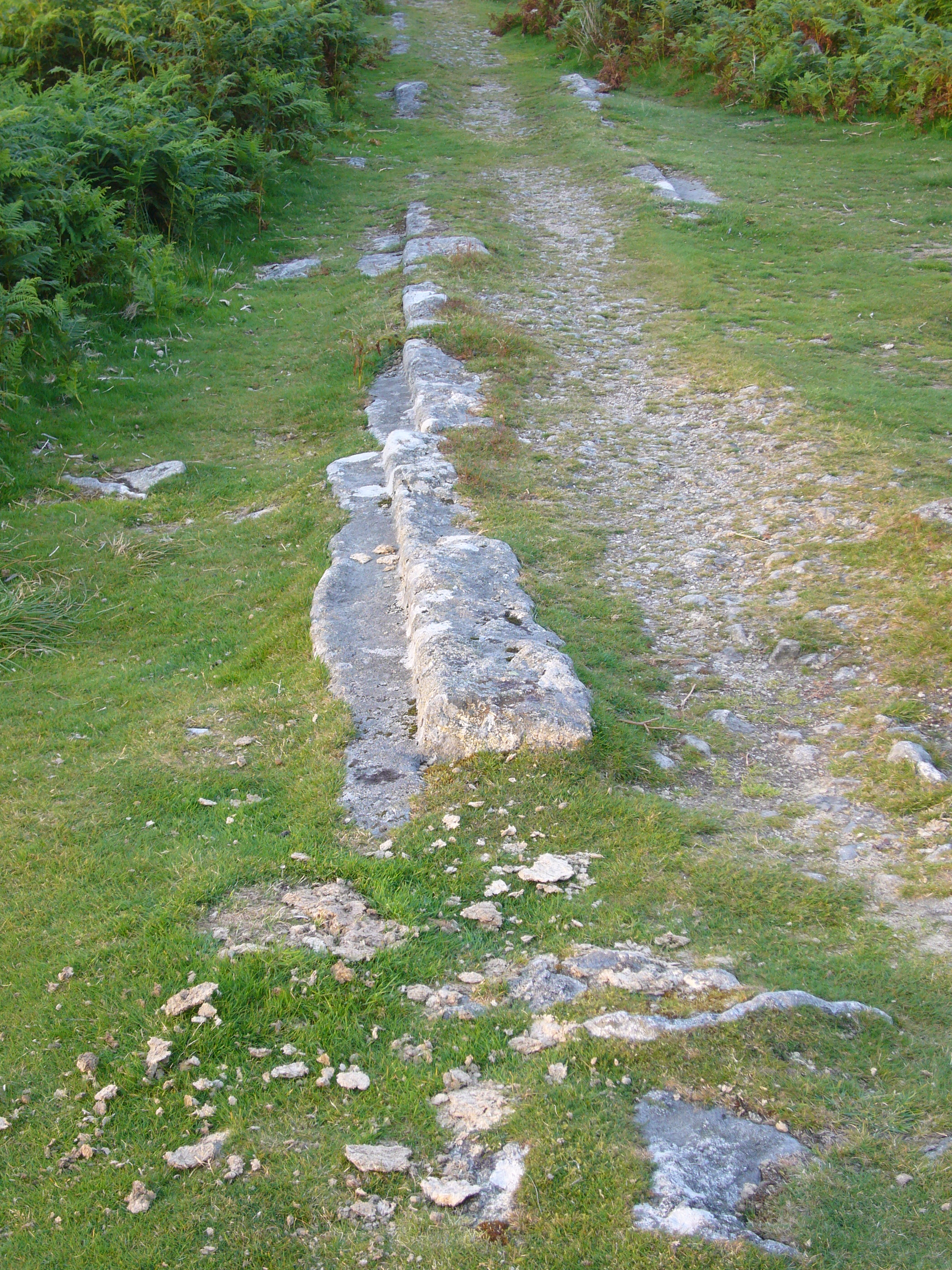
Detail of the track on the Haytor Granite Tramway

The gauge of the track (Note: Measured on the "best preserved portions of the line" in 1899) was 4 ft (1,219 mm) but varied by up to 3 inches (76 mm), and at junctions the wheels were guided by 'point tongues', pivoted on the granite-block rails. Authorities differ on whether the point tongues were oak or iron. In the upward direction, the empty tram wagons were pulled to the quarries by teams of horses; the loaded trams were run downhill by gravity to the Stover Canal basin at Ventiford, Teigngrace.

The route was carefully engineered to follow a consistent downward gradient to the canal basin, following the contours of the land (although one of the upper branches had a contrary gradient, requiring horse draught in the loaded direction). A siding at Manaton Road may have been used to allow trains to pass when meeting in opposing directions.

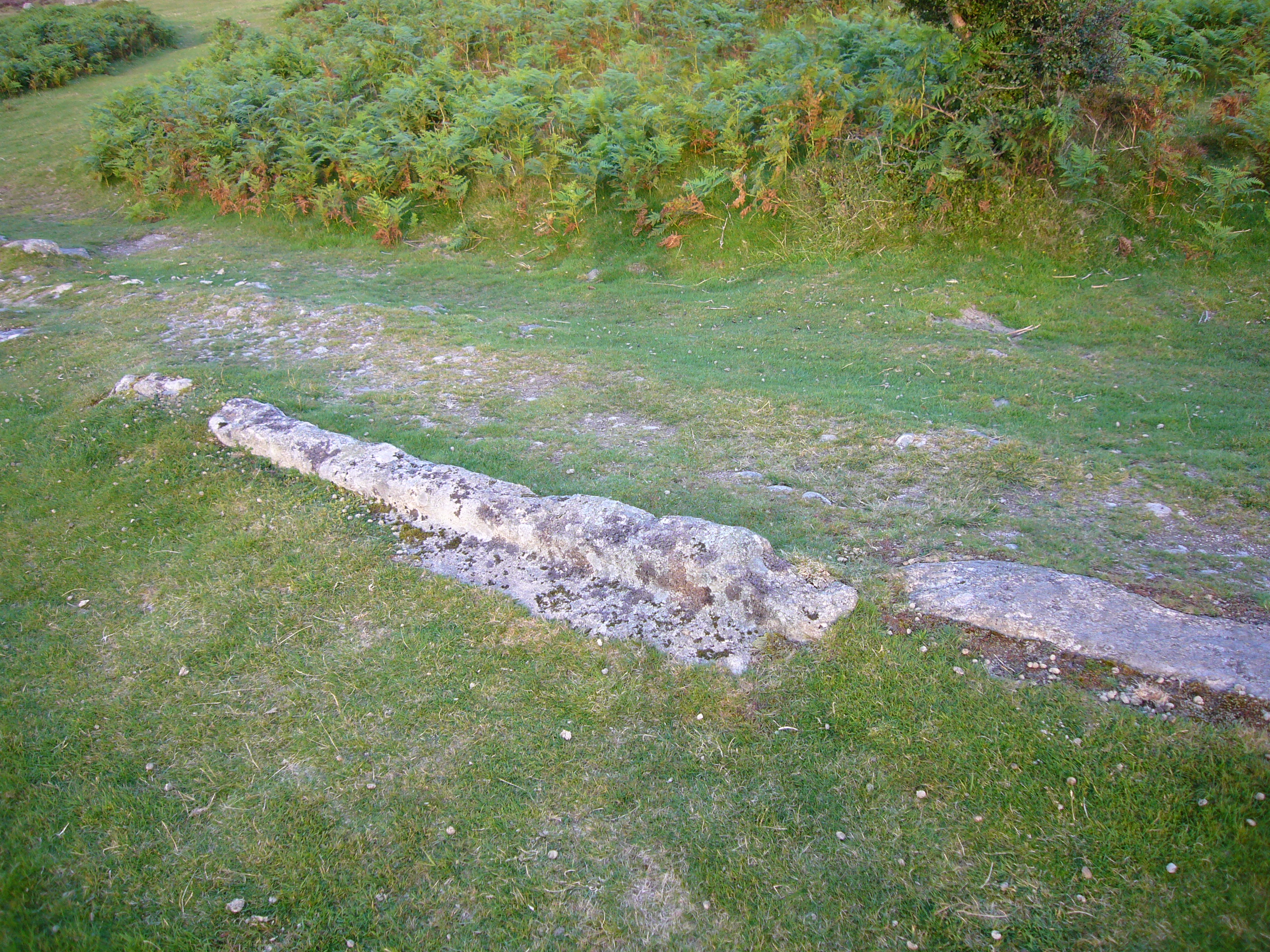
Another section of the tramway

The Stover Canal had been built between 1790 and 1792 by James II Templer (1748–1813) of Stover House, Teigngrace, for the clay traffic, and was extended to Teigngrace in 1820. From here the granite was carried by canal boat to the New Quay at Teignmouth for export by ship, the quay having been built in 1827 for the purpose, making midstream transshipment no longer necessary. In 1829, due to financial difficulties, James Templer's son George Templer (1781–1843) sold Stover House, the Stover Canal and the Haytor Granite Tramway to Edward St Maur, 11th Duke of Somerset (1775–1855), whose family had long owned the nearby large Berry Pomeroy Castle Estate. George Templer left Devon, only to return a few years later and build a new mansion at Sandford Orleigh on the outskirts of Newton Abbot. He became the granite company's chief Devonshire agent.

The wooden flat-topped waggons had iron flangeless wheels and ran in trains of usually twelve waggons drawn by around 18 horses in single file, in front for the upward journey and at the rear for the downward. An old sailor called Thomas Taverner wrote a poem which gives us this information:

Nineteen stout horses it was known,
From Holwell Quarry drew the stone,
And mounted on twelve-wheeled car
'Twas safely brought from Holwell Tor.

The vehicles used were probably adapted road waggons and were about 13 feet (3.96 m) long, with a wheelbase of 10 ft (3.05 m). The wheels were 2 ft (610 mm) in diameter with a 3-inch (76 mm) tread, and were loose on the axles. The twelve-wheeled reference in the poem above means 'twelve waggons with wheels'.

Stover House itself, then the home of the Templer family, had been constructed of Haytor granite in 1781. Granite's popularity as a building material was increasing and the reason for the quarry and tramway's creation was most likely a contract for George Templer to use the stone for London Bridge. Part of the British Museum, the old General Post Office in London and the Waltham Monument in Ludgate Circus were built of Haytor granite in the 19th century. The last use of Haytor quarried granite was the building of the Exeter War Memorial.

The splitting of the granite was done by a method known as feather and tare, which had replaced the former 'wedge and groove' method around 1800; this more reliable method being another reason why the use of granite had become practicable. The new method worked by means of a series of holes was made along a potential line of fracture using a tool called a 'jumper'. Feathers were metal prongs with a curved upper end. Two of these were inserted into the holes, the curves in opposite directions at 90 degrees to the line of potential fracture. A wedge-shaped metal tare was hammered between the two until the granite fractured.

The granite trade was always somewhat sporadic with fluctuating production and indeed no granite was produced or transported between 1841 and 1851 and the quarries and tramway had closed by 1858. Several thousands of tons of granite had been quarried some years, but competition from Cornish granite quarries with cheaper transport put paid to the business and the tramway fell into neglect, however its robust construction and low recyclable value meant that it was never lifted and much has survived the passage of time.

Thomas claims that there were proposals in about 1905 to lay an electric tramway along the route as a tourist attraction, but this scheme failed to mature.

== Construction ==
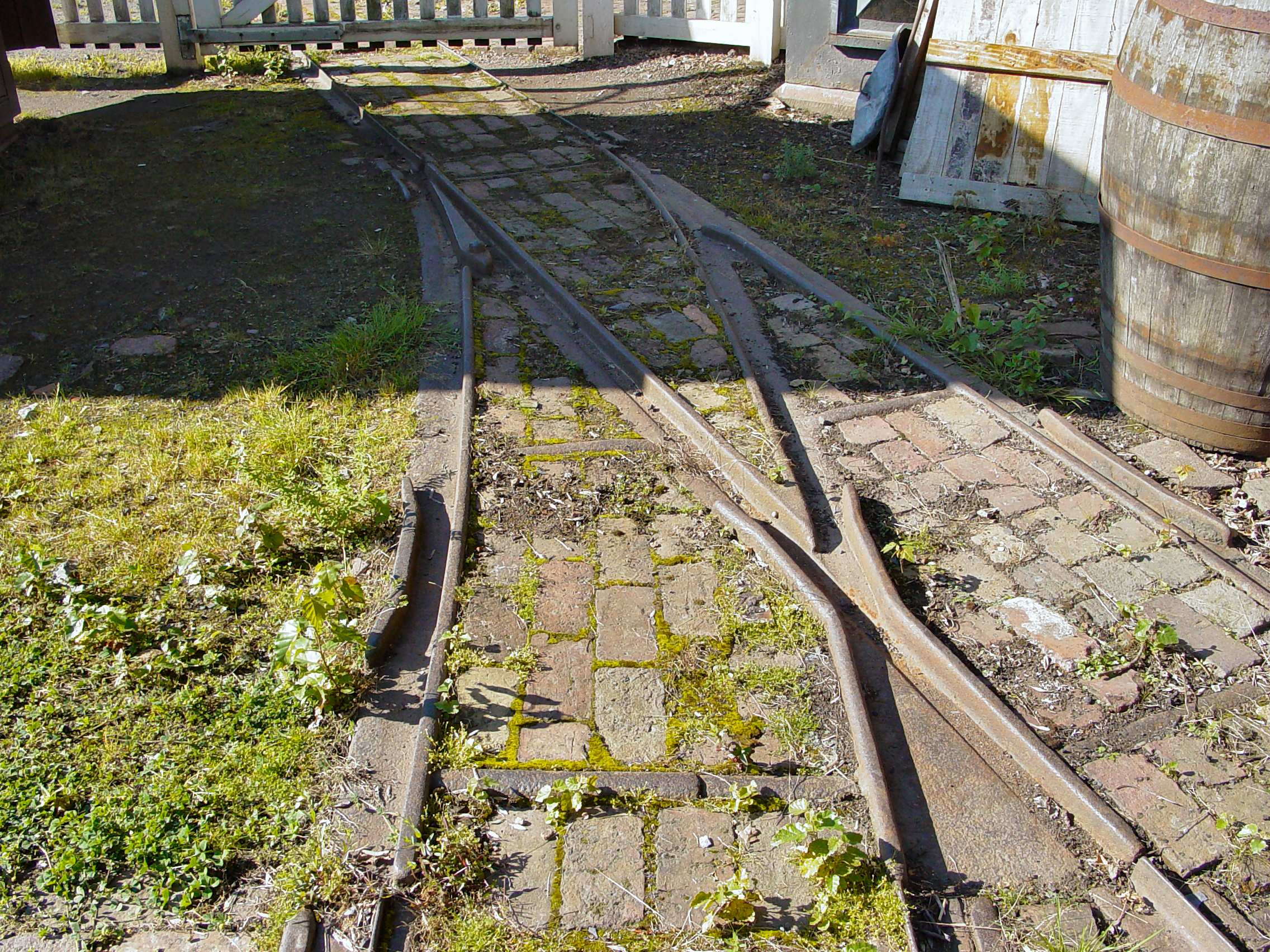
A reconstructed section of flangeway track as used by Richard Trevithick showing striking similarities to the granite trackwork of the Haytor Tramway.

The tramway was built in 1820 without an Act of Parliament and opened on 16 September 1820, but the consulting engineer is unknown, although George Templer of Stover House owned the quarries and was no doubt responsible. A contemporary description of the official opening shows the extent of the achievement:

On Saturday Mr. Templer, of Stover House, gave a grand fete champetre on Haytor Down, on the completion of the granite rail road. The company assembled at its foot on Bovey Heathfield, and in procession passed over it to the rock. A long string of carriages, filled with elegant and beautiful females, multitudes of horsemen, workmen on foot, the wagons covered with laurels and waving streamers, formed in their windings through the valley, an attractive scene to spectators on the adjacent hill. Old Haytor seemed alive: its sides were lined with groups of persons, and on its top a proud flag fluttered in the wind. Previously to returning to dine, Mr Templer addressed the assemblage in a short and energetic speech, which excited bursts of applause...

A later description listed some of the dignitaries who attended:

Among the company were Lord and Lady Clifford of Ugbrooke; Mr. Bastard from Buckland; Sir Thomas Dycke Acland; Sir Henry Carew came from Haccombe; and Sir Lawrence Palk from Haldon, beside many other county magnates from other parts.

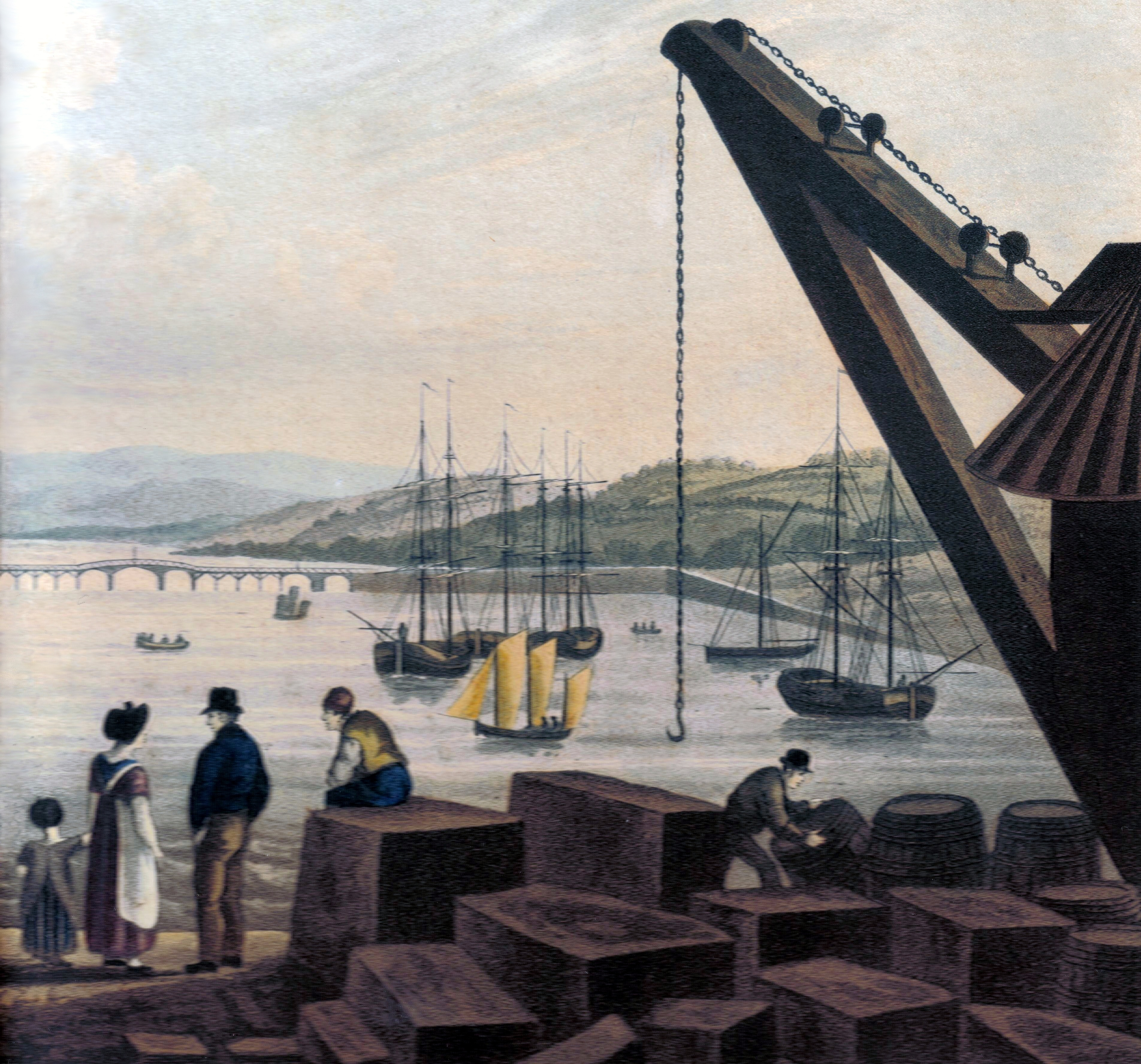
The New Quay at Teignmouth in 1827 with a large crane and blocks of cut granite

The construction is exceedingly unusual, the closest possibly being the Weedon Stoneway in Northamptonshire of 1837 which was built at great expense as a mail coach route by the Turnpike Commissioners who were in competition with the newly constructed London & Birmingham Railway. The only other comparable tramway known to exist was a very short 3 ft gauge limestone line at Conisbrough, near Doncaster. The tramway itself was built out of the granite it would carry and ran from the Haytor quarries to Ventiford Quay on the Stover Canal. At first, it was about 7 miles (11 km) long, but it was later extended to about 9 or 10 miles (14 or 16 km) including the various sidings. The hard granite stone was well-suited to the purpose as it can withstand high pressures and was laid in lieu of iron rails. The tramway had a mainline running down to the Stover canal and six branches or sidings running from the separate quarries. The sidings were altered several times during the existence of the line and track was often lifted and used elsewhere as circumstances demanded. Various minor and one substantial cutting, small embankments and a few short bridges exist along the length of the line. Owing to the nature of the 'rails' large parts of the old tramway still exist, especially in the area near Haytor itself.

== Route ==
Map showing route of the tramway and other relevant features

Carrington in the late 1820s relates how the rail-road can be used as a route, for pedestrians or those on horseback, from Haytor to Teigngrace, making the point that a tramway usually differs from a railway by effectively being part of a road and also that the frequency of the granite traffic was usually low and slow moving, so passage along the route by the public on foot or horseback would not have been particularly hazardous. It may be that pedestrians and riders were asked to pay a toll as on the Kilmarnock and Troon Railway in Ayrshire, Scotland.

Milestones were erected, marking distances from Ventiford. Passengers were never carried and the milestones may have been a whim on behalf of George Templer. The four surviving stones, classified by the Milestone Society, are detailed below:

Image	Miles	MSS Database Ref	OS Coordinates	Location
	3	DV_HTTW03	SX 81121 77230	Between Pottery Road/Ashburton Road, Brimley
	4	DV_HTTW04	SX 79982 78132	In a copse just south of the road from Bovey Tracey to Haytor near Lowerdown Cross
	5	DV_HTTW05	SX 78564 78477	Yarner Wood
	6	DV_HTTW06	SX 78057 77386	Opposite the Bel Alp Hotel on the road to Haytor, soon after it reaches the open commons at the eastern end of Haytor

Granite seems to have been the only traffic carried as the company was reluctant to go to the expense of building high-sided waggons or trucks for iron ore transportation.

When the Moretonhampstead and South Devon Railway was opened in 1866, the tramway had been disused since 1858; however the land owner, the Duke of Somerset, insisted that a siding and a crane should be built and new interchange sidings made at the 'Bovey Granite Siding', 1-mile (1.6 km) south of Bovey Tracey, although it was probably never used. One mile (1.6 km) of the old tramway route had been taken over for the new line.

The 1831 map of Devonshire by Fisher, Son & Co. depicts the course of the tramway and erroneously shows it running directly down to the Teign without the Stover canal being in existence. A map of Devon of about 1865 shows the course of the line.

== The Templer Way ==
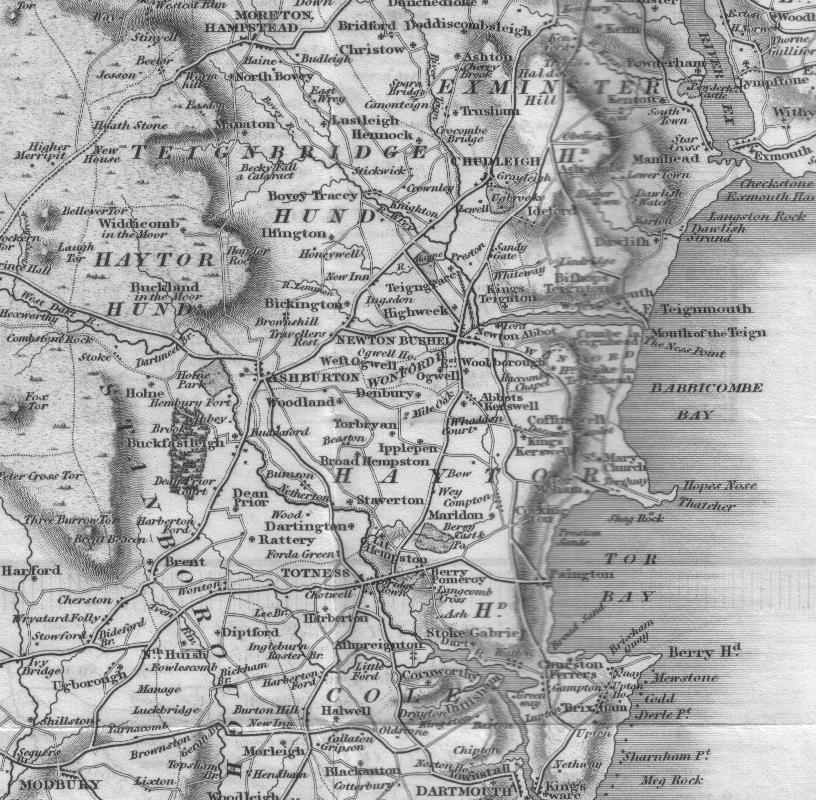
The area between Haytor and Teignmouth in the 1830s. The Stover canal is marked, but not the tramway (Carrington c. 1830)

This is a route which follows closely the route of the Haytor Granite Tramway and the Stover Canal, continuing to the New Quay in Teignmouth docks. A good place to see the track is where it crosses a minor road which leads to Manaton, just off the Haytor to Bovey Tracey road.

Once off the moor the place to see the track at its best is a small section of the tramway running through Yarner Wood. There is also a well-made five-mile (8 km) marker stone. The granite track sections can be followed through the woods before the pathway diverts back onto the main Bovey Tracey road. The tramway cuts across fields down to the road which runs beside the Edgemoor Hotel and a few track setts lie scattered on the lawn of this hotel, but no clear line of the track can be distinguished. Chapple Bridge was the only bridge on the tramway, crossing the Bovey leat, until the opening of the second quarry at Holwell Tor. Ventiford Cottages were built to house employees who worked on the tramway and canal, although some lived in a collection of small houses clustered around the inn which lay below Haytor Rocks. Stables were also maintained here for the horses that worked the canal and the railway. Granite setts can clearly be seen in the construction of bridges on the route of the Templer Waybridge.

A previously-unknown section of the tramway at its terminus at Ventiford Basin was discovered in late 2014.

== See also ==
- British quarrying and mining narrow gauge railways
- Ilsington
- List of Sites of Special Scientific Interest in Devon
- Auchincruive Waggonway

== Bibliography ==
- Ewans, M.C. (1966). The Haytor Granite Tramway and Stover Canal. Newton Abbot: David & Charles.
- Harris, Helen; Thurlow, George (1994). The Haytor Granite Tramway and Stover Canal. Peninsula Press. ISBN 978-1-872640-28-0.
- The most amazing places to visit in Britain. The Reader's Digest Association. 2006. p. 24. ISBN 978-0-276-44176-9.
- Haytor Granite Tramway and Stover Canal, A Countryside Study. Exeter: Devon County Council. 1985. ISBN 978-0-86114-559-1.
