= Ilford Park Polish Home =

British care home in Stover, Devon

Coordinates: 50°33′31″N 03°39′11″W

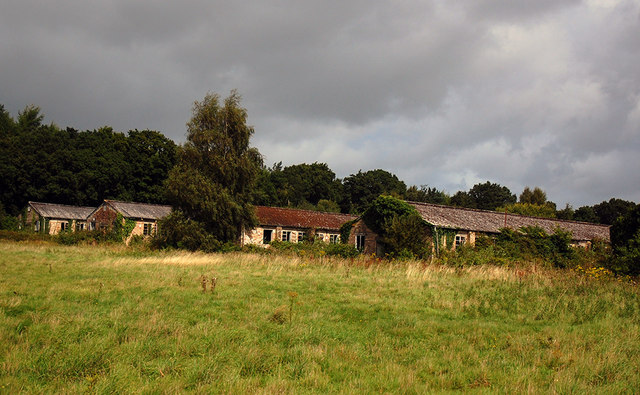
Derelict structures from the former camp, photographed in 2009

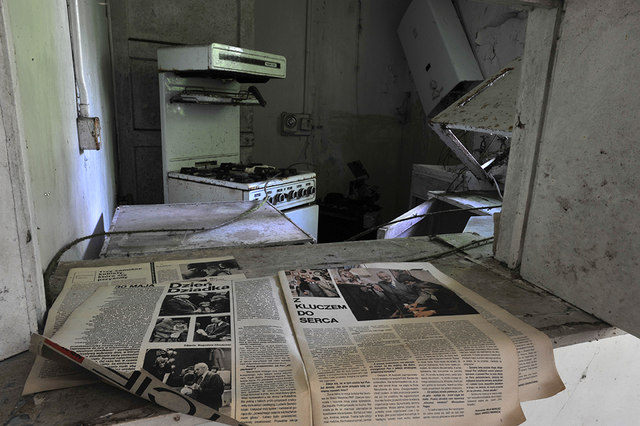
Interior of one of the abandoned buildings, photographed in 2009

Ilford Park Polish Home is a residential and nursing care home in Stover, Devon, in England run by the Ministry of Defence. The site was one of 45 resettlement camps established by the National Assistance Board in the late 1940s to cater for Polish veterans entitled to remain in the UK under the Polish Resettlement Act 1947. Ilford Park is the last of the camps to remain in operation and can cater for around 100 residents. In 1992 residents were housed in a new home built on part of the site, the former camp remained derelict for a period but, as of 2022, some of the site has been redeveloped into a caravan site.

== History ==
Many Polish forces fought for the Allies in the Second World War and a significant portion serving with the Polish Armed Forces in the West were based in the United Kingdom. In the aftermath of the war former prime minister Winston Churchill singled out the Poles for their contribution to victory and stated that Britain "will never forget the debt they owe to the Polish troops who have served them so valiantly". The Polish Resettlement Act 1947, also known as the "Winston Churchill promise", made the National Assistance Board responsible for the care of qualifying Poles and their dependants. The Board established 45 resettlement camps across the country to cater for these people.

Ilford Park opened in 1948 at Stover Camp, a hospital built in anticipation of American casualties suffered during the Invasion of Normandy. At its peak it hosted 600 Poles, leading to the area to become known as "Little Poland". The camp facilities were basic with bare breeze-block walled barrack blocks and a shared central hall; there were initially no toilets in the blocks and, until 1973, no central heating. For a period a Young's Seafood factory operated on the site, employing 40-50 residents and making the world's first mass-produced scampi.

The camp evolved from its original purpose, of assisting veterans and their dependants to resettle elsewhere, into a residential and care home for the elderly. The National Assistance Board's role at the 41-acre (17 ha) site ended and responsibility passed to the Ministry of Defence. Ilford Park is the last of the Polish camps operating in the UK and the last residential or care home operated by the Ministry. Its residents are drawn from across the country and include those who were unable to resettle from the camps as well as those who initially resettled but returned to the camp in later years.

== Current home ==
The original care home on the site fell into disrepair and ministers agreed, in 1987, to fund a new home on a 9-acre (3.6 ha) portion of the site. The foundation stone of the new home was laid by Oliver Eden, 8th Baron Henley in November 1991 and he returned to open the home on 16 December 1992, accompanied by the Polish Consul General. The home now provides care for up to 98 residents split between an 81-bed care wing, a 14-bed nursing wing and three independent living bungalows.

The site also hosts a Polish delicatessen and chapel. At least 30 per cent of the staff are bilingual in Polish and English and the site works closely with the Polish Embassy, the Polish Catholic Mission and other Polish groups. As with other care homes in England the site is subject to inspection by the Care Quality Commission. In 2020 the freehold of the care home was bought by Ilford Park Care Ltd, owned by Mohamed Amersi. The home's manager, Clare Thomas, was appointed a Member of the Order of the British Empire in the 2020 Birthday Honours for her services to care at the home during the COVID-19 pandemic. With numbers of residents falling to 40 in 2026 the MoD entered into a public consultation on possible closure of the home by 2028.

Until at least 2008 the old camp structures remained standing, though dilapidated, and signs warned trespassers of the presence of asbestos. As of 2022, part of the site has since been developed into Regency Court, a static caravan site.
