= George Templer =

British landowner

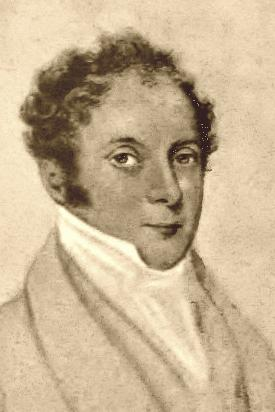
A drawing of George Templer by an unknown artist

George Templer (1781 – 12 December 1843) was a landowner in Devon, England, and the builder of the Haytor Granite Tramway. His father was the second James Templer (1748–1813) who had built the Stover Canal.

He inherited the Stover estate in Teigngrace, Devon on the death of his father, but left its running to his lawyer, preferring to spend his time hunting (founding the South Devon Hunt), writing poetry, and in amateur dramatics. He lived with a mistress and had six children by her before running into financial difficulties and selling his entire estate to the Duke of Somerset. He later built himself a house on the outskirts of Newton Abbot and married the daughter of Sir John Kennaway in 1835. He died in 1843 after a hunting accident.

== Personal life ==
George Templer was born in 1781, the eldest son of the second James Templer. He was educated at Westminster, and inherited the Stover estate on his father's death in 1813. Noted for his kindness, his hospitality and for his lavish lifestyle, his interests lay in poetry, amateur dramatics, field sports and cricket rather than business, which he mostly left to his lawyer and others. Before 1815 he fell in love with Ann Wreford, the daughter of a nearby farmer, who moved in with him and bore him six children, although they were not married.

From the early 1800s, Templer was involved in the breeding and training of beagles, and he was master of the first regular hunt in South Devon, the South Devon Hunt which he founded in about 1810. He was an early friend of Jack Russell, "The Sporting Parson", and taught him much about fox-hounds. In 1820 he was a Lieutenant-Colonel in the South Devon Yeomanry. He was also a pioneer of cricket and was one of the founders of Teignbridge Cricket Club in 1823. Templer was fond of entertaining at Stover House: his guests included Sarah Siddons and "Mr. Kemble", who were said to have praised his and his family and servants' performance of Shakespeare.

In the later 1820s Templer ran into financial difficulties, considered today to be due mainly to his extravagant lifestyle and his lack of business acumen, though he himself blamed his downfall on the dishonesty of a lawyer, about whom he wrote a bitter poem entitled "The Attorney", the first verse of which runs:

Friends! neighbours! countrymen! / I take the liberty to warn ye, / Against that universal scourge, / A rascally Attorney.

He was forced to sell his pack of hounds in 1826, meaning that the South Devon Hunt did not meet in 1826/7. This led him to write a poem to his old hunting horn which he recited at a meeting of sportsmen in Chulmleigh under the chairmanship of the Hon. Newton Fellowes. In January 1829 he sold his entire estate including the Stover Canal and the Haytor Granite Tramway to the 11th Duke of Somerset. On leaving the estate for the last time he wrote the following:

Stover, farewell! Still fancy's hand shall trace
Thy pleasures past in all their former grace;
And I will wear and cherish, though we part,
The dear remembrance ever at my heart.
Not as the hare whom hounds and horn pursue
In timid constancy I cling to you;
But, like the bolder chase, resolved, I fly,
That where I may not live I will not die.

He went abroad, but returned to the area before 1833 and built Sandford Orleigh house on the outskirts of Newton Abbot. In 1835 he married Charlotte Kennaway, daughter of Sir John Kennaway, 1st Baronet of Escot House. At Sandford Orleigh he had a set of early-16th-century carved oak screens made into an ornamental overmantel: this was donated to Newton Abbot museum in 2008, after being removed from the house when it was converted into flats. The overmantel had suffered some damage, but it was restored and is now on display in the museum.

Templer died at Sandford Orleigh on 12 December 1843 after a hunting accident. There is a mural monument to him in Teigngrace church.

== Business interests ==
Templer built the Haytor Granite Tramway that ran for 8.5 miles (13.7 km) from his granite quarries at Haytor to the head of the Stover Canal that had been constructed by his father. It may have been the winning of a contract to provide granite for John Rennie's rebuilding of London Bridge that led Templer to develop the tramway; light grey "Devonshire Haytor" granite was specified, along with two Scottish granites, by the Act of Parliament that authorised the new bridge. The tramway was opened on 16 September 1820 with a great celebration at Haytor at which Templer gave a "short and energetic speech, which excited bursts of applause".

In 1825 Templer formed the Company of the Proprietors of the Devon Haytor Quarries, which soon became a joint-stock company, with capital of £200,000 and offices in Broad Street, London. He built accommodation for the quarry workers near to his quarries, including in 1825–6 a row of houses and a hostel (now the Rock Inn) at Haytor Vale. The Duke of Somerset, who owned the land, was paid £200 a year by the company for the right to extend its quarrying to 600 acres, though it actually only ever used 90 acres. The company was soon providing several thousand tons of granite a year for buildings such as the British Museum, the National Gallery, and many others. The granite was also used for more prosaic and local uses such as kerbstones, pavements and setts for road surfaces.

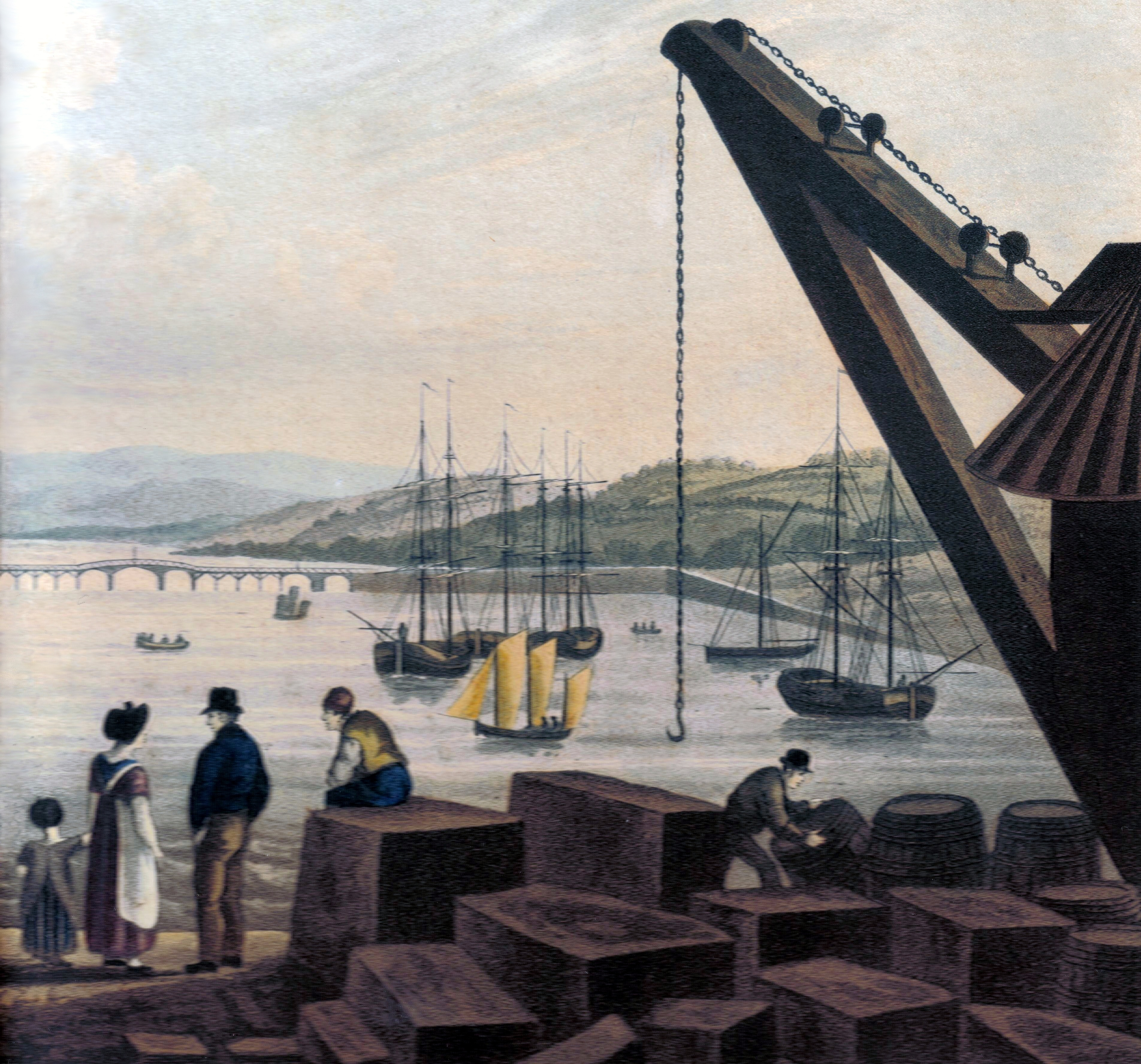
Teignmouth New Quay in 1827 showing blocks of cut Haytor granite awaiting transport

After the granite was transferred from the tramway carriages to barges, the barges travelled down the Stover Canal and then down the Teign estuary to the port of Teignmouth. This traffic was in addition to the transport of ball clay that was still ongoing since the opening of the canal by Templer's father in 1792. To help with the transfer of the granite from the barges to ships for the next leg of the journey, Templer built a "New Quay" at Teignmouth in the early 1820s.

Templer's business ventures were only able to support him for a short time: by the late 1820s he was in financial difficulties despite shipping 20,000 tons of clay and granite per annum down the canal. The difficulties with the granite business have been attributed to the strong competition that developed from other sources of granite, particularly in Cornwall, that did not need two transfers (tramway to canal barge, and barge to ship), as well as Templer's lack of business acumen, which was described by L. T. C. Rolt in 1974 as him being "incapable of answering letters or taking important decisions and equally unable to select reliable men for positions of trust in his ventures".

After the sale of his assets to the Duke of Somerset, Templer became the chief Devon agent for the Haytor Granite company in the early 1830s, but he still caused problems for the company. For example, in 1833–4 questions were raised over whether he had properly retained the lease on the quarries, and the directors questioned his reticence in chasing up money owed and his willingness to sell the granite at far below its fair price.

== Bibliography ==
- Crossing, William (1902). A Hundred Years on Dartmoor (5th ed.). Plymouth: The Western Morning News Co. Ltd.
- Ewans, M. C. (1977). The Haytor Granite Tramway and Stover Canal (3rd ed.). Newton Abbot: David & Charles. ISBN 0-7153-4020-4.
- Harris, Helen (2002). The Haytor Granite Tramway and Stover Canal (2nd ed.). Newton Abbot: Peninsula Press. ISBN 1-872640-28-1.
- Pridham, T. L. (1869). Devonshire Celebrities. Exeter: Henry S. Eland.
- Rolt, L. T. C. (1974). The Potters' Field. A History of the South Devon Ball Clay Industry. Newton Abbot: David & Charles. ISBN 0-7153-6504-5.
- Tozer, Edward J. F. (1916). The South Devon Hunt. The author.
