= Teigngrace =

Civil parish in Devon, England

Coordinates: 50°33′20″N 3°37′36″W

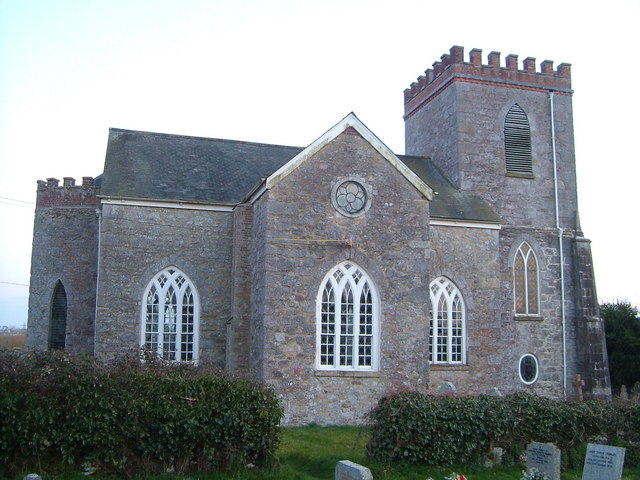
- Teigngrace parish church

- Location within Devon
- Population: 235 (2001 census)
- Civil parish: Teigngrace
- District: Teignbridge
- Shire county: Devon
- Region: South West
- Country: England
- Sovereign state: United Kingdom
- Post town: NEWTON ABBOT
- Postcode district: TQ12
- Dialling code: 01626

Teigngrace is a civil parish centred on a hamlet that lies about two miles north of the town of Newton Abbot in Devon, England. According to the 2001 census, its population was 235, compared to 190 a century earlier. The western boundary of the parish mostly runs along the A382 road; its short northern boundary along the A38; and its eastern partly along the rivers Bovey and Teign. It comes to a point at its southern extremity, near Newton Abbot Racecourse. The parish is surrounded, clockwise from the north, by the parishes of Bovey Tracey, Kingsteignton, Newton Abbot and a small part of Ilsington.

The name Teigngrace derives from the name of the river and Geoffrey Gras, who held the manor in 1352. Geoffrey was a kinsman of 'John called Gras', (meaning 'the fat one'), who was a canon at Torre Abbey in 1351.

The parish church, dedicated to St Peter and St Paul, has a 15th-century foundation, but was rebuilt by the Templer family out of local grey limestone (not granite as reported by Ewans) in 1787 and was restored in 1872. It contains a number of 18th-century monuments.

Map showing the boundary of Teigngrace parish and some relevant features

Within the parish are several reminders of the area's industrial heritage: the Stover Canal and the Haytor Granite Tramway—both built by the Templer family—run through the parish, as does the single-track line of the Moretonhampstead and South Devon Railway, which is still occasionally used for freight. Teigngrace Halt served the village from 1876 to 1959. The parish lies at the edge of the geological formation known as the Bovey Basin and some of the extensive ball clay deposits that exist here have been mined within its boundaries.

In 1997 one of the clay mining companies, Watts Blake Bearne (now part of Sibelco, wanted to divert parts of the rivers Teign and Bovey to gain access to new resources of quality ball clay deposits which they said would provide much employment and would last for 100 years. However about 80 environmental campaigners occupied the site—with the approval of most of the residents—claiming that it was a haven for wildlife including the rare cirl bunting. The complaints resulted in Environment Secretary, John Prescott, putting the plans on hold pending a public enquiry which was held in 1998. During the enquiry, errors were discovered in the clay company's flood flow predictions, which resulted in it withdrawing its application.

Since 1948 the Ilford Park Polish Home has housed former Polish Second World War veterans and their dependents. It is run by the Ministry of Defence.

== The Templers and Stover ==
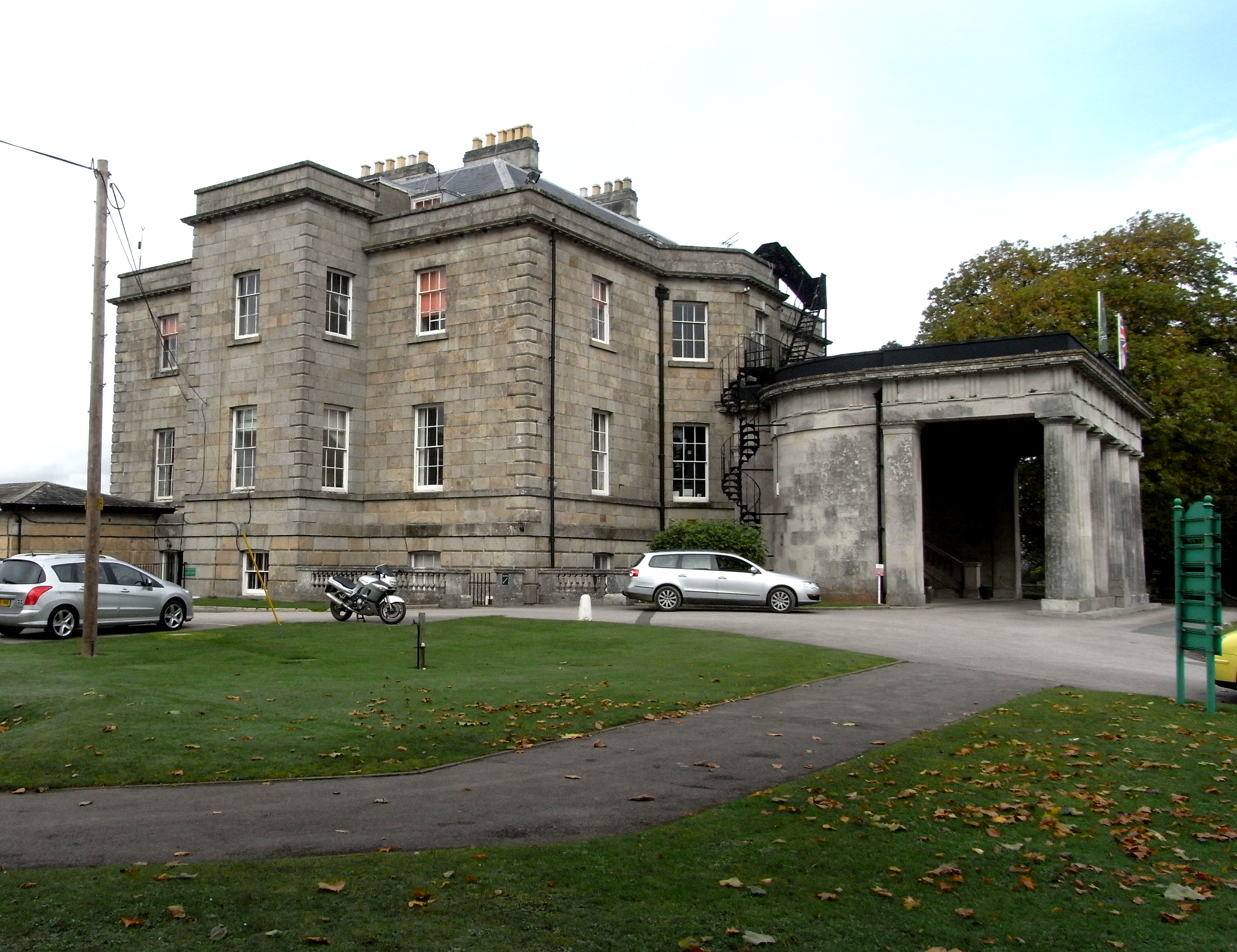
The west front of Stover House

In the late 18th and early 19th centuries, the Templer family lived on the Stover estate which had its centre in the parish, but extended northwards as far as Dartmoor. The estate was purchased in 1765 by James Templer (1722–1782), who had made his fortune erecting government buildings. He built Stover House between 1776 and 1780 out of Dartmoor granite. His son James Templer (1748–1813), built the Stover Canal and rebuilt St Peter and St Paul's Church, the parish church of Teigngrace. His son George Templer (1781–1843) built the tramway from Haytor, but encountered serious debt problems, and was forced to sell the estate to Edward St Maur, 11th Duke of Somerset in 1829.

The Stover estate remained in the ownership of the Dukes of Somerset until it was sold in 1921. In 1932 the house and 64 acres of grounds became Stover House School, a private school for girls. Part of the remainder of the estate situated south of the A38 road now forms the 114-acre Stover Country Park, a local nature reserve owned and managed by Devon County Council.

== Notable people ==
Apart from the Templer family noted above, the character actor Thorley Walters was born here in 1913.
