= Haytor =

Granite tor on Dartmoor in Devon, England

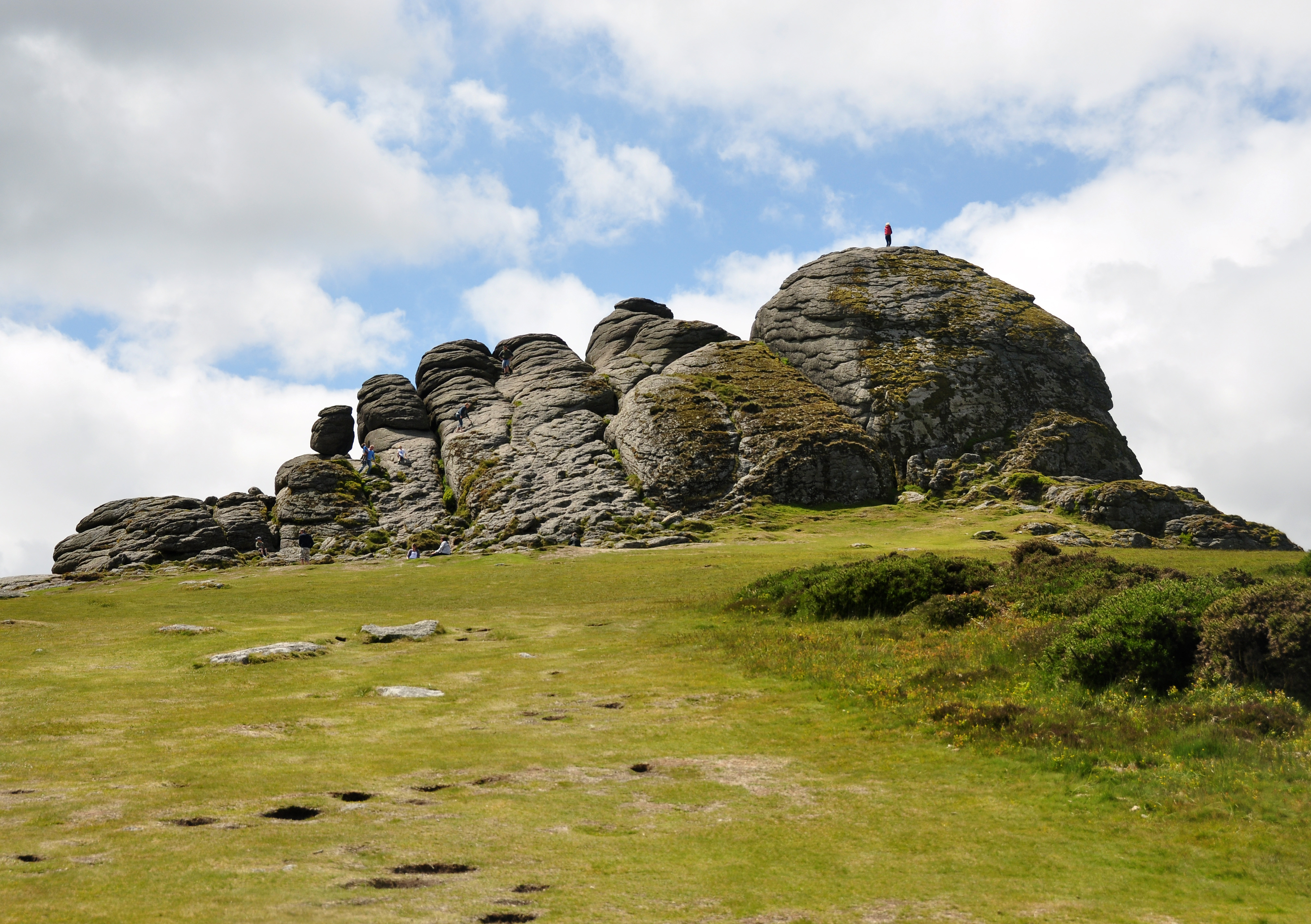
- The larger eastern outcrop of Haytor

Highest point
- Elevation: 457 m (1,499 ft)
- Coordinates: 50°34′45″N 3°45′21″W

Geography
- Location within Devon
- Location: Dartmoor, England
- OS grid: SX757770
- Topo map: OS Landranger 191

Interactive map of Haytor

Haytor, also known as Haytor Rocks, Hay Tor, or occasionally Hey Tor, is a granite tor on the eastern edge of Dartmoor in the English county of Devon.

== Location ==
The tor is at grid reference SX757770, near the village of Haytor Vale in the parish of Ilsington. There is an electoral ward with the same name. The population at the 2011 census is 2,862.

== History ==
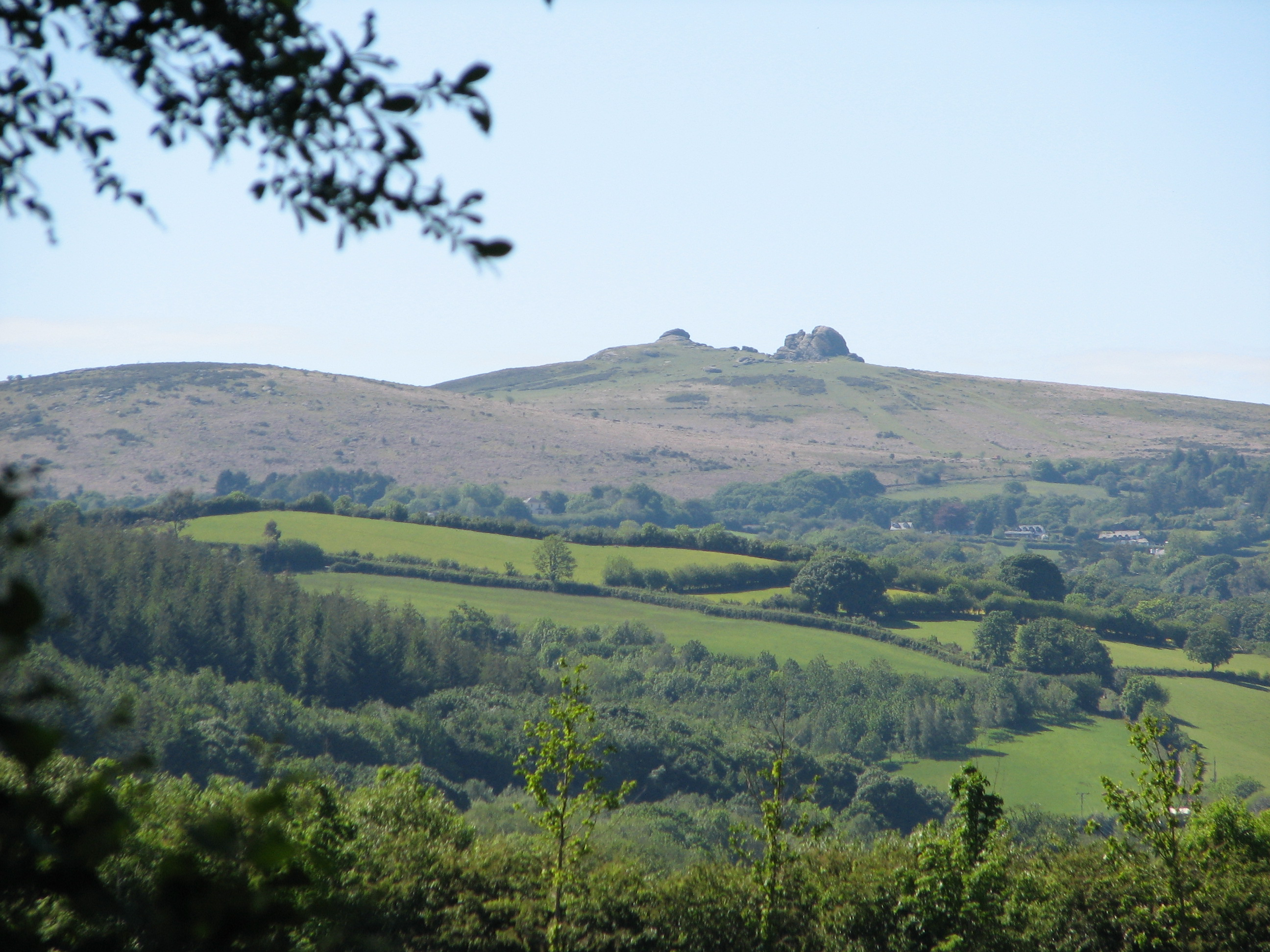
A typical distant view of Haytor as seen from the A38 road between Exeter and Plymouth

Idetordoune (1566), Ittor Doune (1687), Idetor (1737), Eator Down (1762) and Itterdown (1789) are a few recorded examples of earlier names by which Haytor was known. The name Haytor is of comparatively recent origin, and is probably a corruption of its old name and that of the Haytor Hundred, which covered the coastal area between the River Teign and River Dart, itself now considered to have been named after a lost village located somewhere between Totnes and Newton Abbot.

In the 19th century steps were made to allow pedestrians up to the top of the tor and a metal handrail fixed to allow tourists easier access to the summit. This was not entirely welcomed and in 1851, a Dr Croker complained about the rock steps that had been cut "to enable the enervated and pinguedinous scions of humanity of this wonderful nineteenth century to gain the summit". The handrail was removed in the 1960s due to it rusting: the stumps of the uprights are still embedded in the rock.

In 1953, Haytor was used as a major location for the feature film Knights of the Round Table starring Robert Taylor and Ava Gardner. An "elaborate and impressive castle" was built between the two main rock piles of the tor and traditional medieval sports, including jousting, were staged here for the film.

The whole of Haytor Down was sold to the newly formed Dartmoor National Park Authority in 1974.

== Geology ==
Haytor has the form of a typical "avenue" tor, where the granite between the two main outcrops has been eroded away. Its characteristic shape is a notable landmark visible on the skyline from many places in south Devon between Exeter and Totnes. The majority of the tor consists of coarse-grained granite, but at the base of the western outcrop is a layer of finer-grained granite which has eroded more than the rock above, leaving a pronounced overhang (a rock shelter) of two or three feet in places.

Haytorite, a variety of quartz found in an iron mine adjacent to the Hay Tor granite quarries, was named “in honour of its birth-place”.

== Quarrying ==
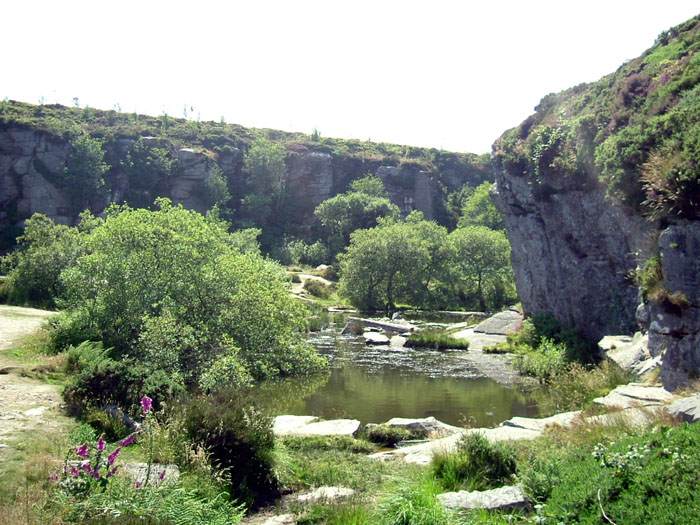
Haytor quarry

The granite below the tor has fewer large feldspar crystals than at the tor itself, and this was preferred for building. There are several quarries on the northern slopes of Haytor down which were worked intermittently between 1820 and 1919. Between 1820 and 1858 the rock from these quarries was transported by the Haytor Granite Tramway to the Stover Canal. The tramway itself was built out of the granite it would carry, and due to its durable nature much of it remains visible today.

Haytor granite was used in the reconstruction of London Bridge which opened in 1831 and was moved in 1970 to Lake Havasu City in Arizona. The last rock quarried here in 1919 was used for the Exeter war memorial.

== Today ==
Haytor rocks and quarries are protected from development and disturbance as a Site of Special Scientific Interest. The area is considered a natural beauty spot and is arguably Dartmoor's most famous landmark, visited by coach parties and walking groups. It is accessible by road and at a height of 457 metres (1,499 ft) right on the eastern side of the moor, it provides views of the coastline, the Teign Estuary and the rolling countryside between, with the ridge of Haldon behind. In 2013, Simon Jenkins rated the view from Haytor as one of the top ten in England.

The smaller, western outcrop is sometimes known as "Lowman". Rock climbers make use of both outcrops; each has routes of varying difficulty.

The road that passes below the tor hosted a summit finish on Stage 6 of the 2013 Tour of Britain, and the climb was again used for the finish of the sixth stage of the 2016 Tour of Britain.

== Sources ==
- Eric Hemery (1983). High Dartmoor. London: Robert Hale. ISBN 0-7091-8859-5.
- Perkins, John (1972). Geology Explained: Dartmoor and the Tamar Valley. Newton Abbot: David and Charles. ISBN 0-7153-5516-3.
