= Petroc (college) =

College in Devon, England

- Type: Public; Further education Higher education
- Active: 2008 (merger of North Devon College and East Devon College); 2009 (renamed Petroc)–5th January 2026
- Principal: Kurt Hintz
- Location: Barnstaple and Tiverton, England, United Kingdom; 51.072°N 4.069°W; 51.065°N 4.083°W; 50.912°N 3.492°W
- Campus: North Devon and Mid Devon
- Website: www.petroc.ac.uk

Petroc was a further education (FE) and higher education (HE) college in Devon, England, with a catchment area covering more than 1,500 square miles (3,900 km^{2}). It had the largest A-level sixth form in North Devon. The college served up to 11,000 students each year, on a wide range of full and part-time courses (from entry level to higher education in partnership with Plymouth University), including distance learning and work-based training.

Petroc was formed from the merger North Devon College and East Devon College on 1 August 2008. North Devon College was the nominal survivor of the merger, however that name was deemed unsuitable for the merged college due to its expanded catchment area. The merged college was renamed Petroc in 2009. The college is named after St Petroc, a saint with numerous dedications throughout Devon and the patron saint of the Devon flag.

In 2015 the college was graded ‘good’ by Ofsted. In 2017 it was rated as Silver within the Teaching Excellence Framework.

Petroc had two campuses. The North Devon Campus was in Barnstaple. The college had a third campus also located in Barnstaple, in the Roundswell area, and takes its name from Brannam Pottery, the company which formerly occupied the site, but this campus closed in July 2023, and is now occupied partially by a branch of HBH Woolacotts. The Mid Devon Campus was in Tiverton, and became a campus of Exeter College as a result of the 2025 merger.

== Merger with Exeter College ==
In December 2025 the college announced that it would merge with Exeter College to form the Exeter and North Devon Colleges Group (ENDC), meaning that from the 5th of January 2026 the North Devon campus reverted to using the name of North Devon College. That was used prior to 2008 and the mid-Devon campus became a sub-campus of Exeter College.
