= Newton Abbot =

Town in Teignbridge District, Devon, England

Coordinates: 50.529°N 3.610°W

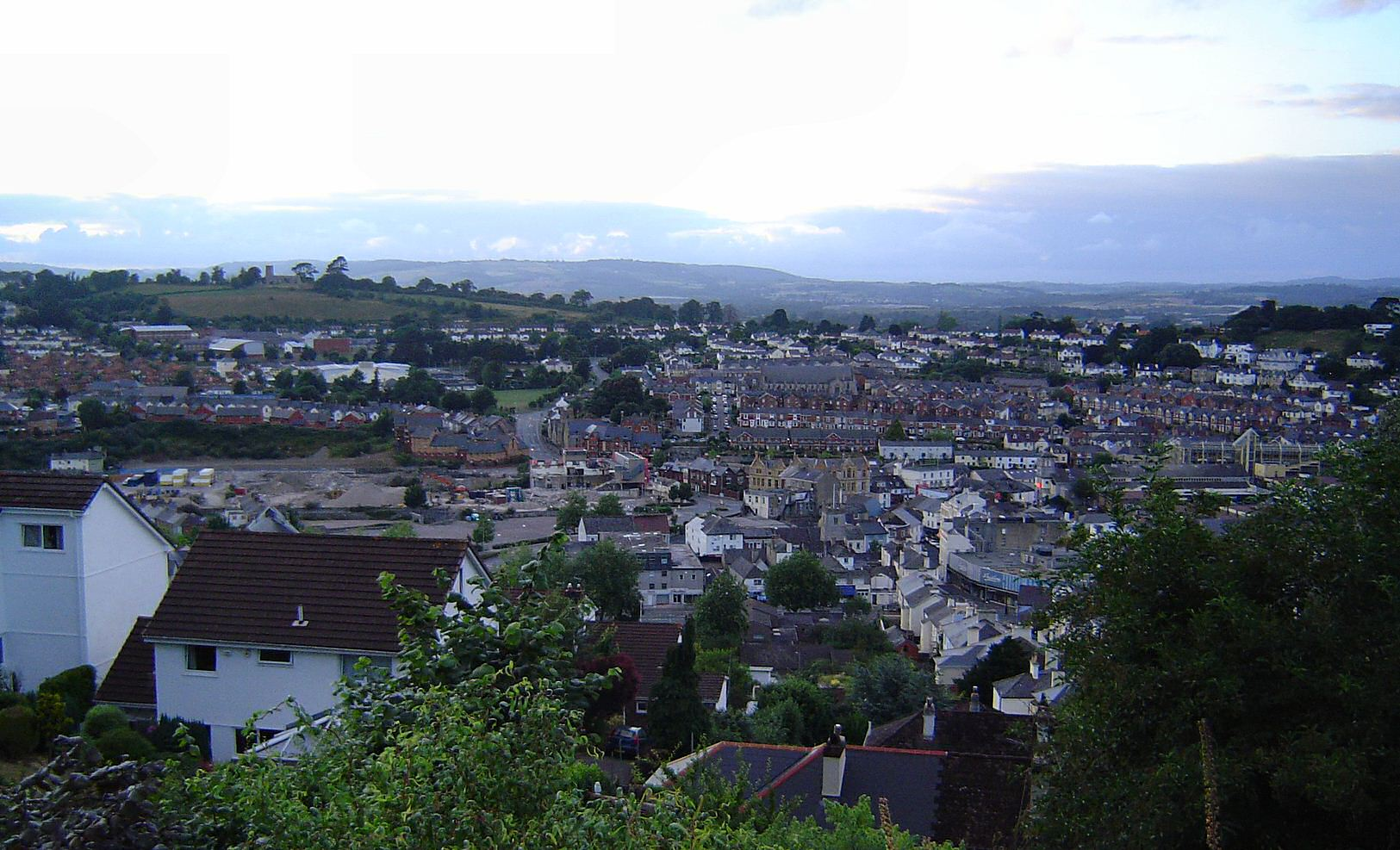
- View over central Newton Abbot taken from Wolborough Hill, July 2005

- Flag

- Location within Devon
- Population: 26,746 (2021 Census)
- OS grid reference: SX860713
- Civil parish: Newton Abbot
- District: Teignbridge
- Shire county: Devon
- Region: South West
- Country: England
- Sovereign state: United Kingdom
- Post town: NEWTON ABBOT
- Postcode district: TQ12
- Dialling code: 01626
- Police: Devon and Cornwall
- Fire: Devon and Somerset
- Ambulance: South Western
- UK Parliament: Newton Abbot

Newton Abbot is a market town and civil parish on the River Teign in the Teignbridge District of Devon, England. It lies near the River Teign and Whitelake, approximately 26 miles (42 km) northwest of Plymouth, 13 miles (21 km) southwest of Exeter, and 40 miles (64 km) south-southwest of Taunton. It had a population of 26,746 at the 2021 census, which was previously estimated at 26,655 in 2019.

Newton Abbot grew rapidly in the Victorian era as the home of the South Devon Railway locomotive works. This later became a major steam engine shed, retained to service British Railways diesel locomotives until 1981. It now houses the Brunel industrial estate. The town has a race course nearby, the most westerly in England, and a country park, Decoy.

== Toponymy ==
Newton Abbot does not appear in the Domesday Book of 1086. It is first documented in the late 12th century in Latin as Nova Villa: "new farm". In 1201 it was recorded as Nieweton' abbatis: "New settlement belonging to the abbot". The land was granted to Torre Abbey by William de Briwere in 1196.

Robert Bussell acquired the area in the Highweek parish and Teignbridge Hundred, which was then Newton Bushel. The twin towns worked together and their markets were eventually combined. Local noted antiquarian Cecil Torr states that the town continued to be known simply as Newton or Newton Bushel to the majority of people prior to the arrival of the railway, which named the station Newton Abbot in order to distinguish it from other towns called Newton on the railway network.

Even after the arrival of the railway, the mononym "Newton" remained in common use, with Richard Nicholls Worth noting in 1880 that "Newton is a modern development of the ancient towns of Newton Abbot and Newton Bushell, which the railway has made into an important centre".

== History ==
=== Early history ===
Traces of Neolithic inhabitants have been found at Berry's Wood Hill Fort near Bradley Manor. This was a contour hill fort that enclosed about 11 acres (4.5 ha). Milber Down camp was built before the 1st century BC and later occupied briefly by the Romans, whose coins have been found there.

Highweek Hill has the remains of a Norman motte-and-bailey castle, known as Castle Dyke. A village grew up around the castle, first called Teignwick, and later Highweek, implying a village on the high ground. Another settlement developed on the low ground around the River Lemon and would become part of Wolborough Manor.

=== The markets ===
There has been a thriving market in Newton Abbot for over 750 years – the first market charter was granted in 1220.

The New Town of the Abbots (of Torre Abbey) was given the right some time between 1247 and 1251 to hold a weekly market on Wednesdays. By 1300 the two settlements were renamed as Newton Abbot (taking the low ground) and Newton Bushel (taking the high ground). On the strength of the market, it quickly became a thriving town and a good source of income for the Abbots.

Over the river, on the Highweek side, another weekly market was created. This one was on Tuesdays; and because the Bushel family were the landowners this community became known as Newton Bushel. Over the next 200 years Newton Bushel ran more annual fairs, a number of mills were set up, and the leather and wool trades started. Newton Bushel was also a convenient place for travellers to stay. Torre Abbey was dissolved in 1539 and ownership of Wolborough was granted to John Gaverock, who built himself a new house at Forde.

The twin markets of Newton Abbot and Newton Bushel continued until they were merged in 1633 as a Wednesday weekly market under the control of Bradley Manor. By 1751 it had been joined by a smaller Saturday market and three annual fairs: a cattle fair on 24 June, a cheese and onion fair in September, and a cloth fair on 6 November. The markets continued to expand, and in 1826 a new market place was built. But over the next 50 years the buildings became dilapidated, and a new corn exchange (now the Alexandra Theatre) and market hall were completed in 1871.

=== Wool and leather ===
In medieval times Devon was an important sheep-rearing county. Many towns had their own wool and cloth industries and Newton Abbot had woollen mills, fullers, dyers, spinners, weavers and tailors. In particular, fellmongering (where wool is completely removed from the sheepskin) was well established in the town. In 1724 Daniel Defoe wrote that Newton Abbot had a thriving serge industry that sent goods to Holland via Exeter. The annual cloth fair was the town's busiest fair. Over the 19th century, Vicary's mills became an important employer in the town and by the 1920s was employing over 400 men. However, by 1972 business had declined and the works closed down.

Associated with the woollen industry was the leather business. Hides left after the fell-mongering process were made into leather. Tanners, boot and shoemakers, glovers and saddlers were all in business in Newton Abbot. As with the wool industry, business flourished over 600 years until after the Second World War.

=== The Newfoundland trade ===
In 1583 Humphrey Gilbert, a local adventurer landed at St. John's in Newfoundland and claimed the area as an English colony. The fisheries quickly developed. Between 1600 and 1850 there was a steady trade between Newton Abbot and the cod fisheries off Newfoundland. Every year men from the town would gather at the Dartmouth Inn or Newfoundland Inn in East Street in the hope of being hired for a season's work. In the autumn the dried cod was stored in depots and sometimes used as payment. There was a considerable economic spin-off from this trade. Fish hooks, knives, waterproof boots and rope were all made in the town. The Rope Walk in East Street just a few yards from the Cider Bar still exists, together with the names Newfoundland Way and St John's Street.

=== Ball clay and the Stover Canal ===
Just 2 miles (3.2 km) north-west of Newton Abbot lie the large ball clay workings of the Bovey Basin. The main workings are on the eastern outcrop of the deposits at Kingsteignton, which can lay claim to being the centre of Britain's ball-clay industry. The Bovey Basin took millions of years to fill from rivers that flowed out of Dartmoor. The sediments included clay derived from the decomposed granite. The natural deposition has resulted in clay that is purer and more refined than many others. Clay is used in a wide range of products such as bricks, tyres, porcelain, medicines and toothpaste.

Kingsteignton clay was being used to make pipes around 1680. By 1700, it was being shipped from Teignmouth, and its utilisation by the famous potter Josiah Wedgwood bred success. The clay was extracted by simply digging out the lumps on courses; rather like peat cutting. The bulky clay was transported by packhorse to Hackney Quay at Kingsteignton, then loaded onto barges for shipment down the Teign Estuary, where it was transferred to small ships bound for Liverpool and other ports.

Towards the end of the 18th century, the ball-clay industry was steadily expanding. A local landowner, James Templer, built the Stover Canal in 1792 to help ship clay along the canal and the Teign Estuary from the Bovey Basin to the port of Teignmouth. Coal, manure and agricultural produce were also shipped along the canal. James Templer's father, also called James Templer, purchased the 80,000-acre (320 km^{2}) Stover Estate near Newton Abbot in 1765. Granite from Hay Tor was used to build Stover House which was completed by 1792. George Templer, son of James Templer (the second) and brother of Rev. John Templer, rector of Teigngrace, built the Haytor Granite Tramway, which had rails cut from granite, connecting the granite quarries of Haytor to the canal. This was completed by 1820 and enabled large quantities of granite to be transported for major works like the new London Bridge which opened in 1825. However, George Templer overspent his resources and was forced to sell Stover House, Stover Canal, the Haytor Granite Tramway and most of the rest of the family's considerable estates to Edward St Maur, 11th Duke of Somerset, in 1829. The canal was extended to cope with this, and the industry fared well until 1858 when they were out-competed by the more economic Cornish coastal quarries. The Stover canal reverted to shipping ball clay, but had ceased to do so by 1939.

The ball-clay industry is now highly mechanised and successful. Most of the clay is transported by road and transferred to ships at the nearby port of Teignmouth.

The Stover Canal Society was formed after a public meeting in February 1999, with the aim of preserving and restoring the canal. Railtrack, which owned most of the canal, transferred ownership in 2005 for the sum of £1 to Teignbridge District Council for leisure use by the community. Work then continued to restore it as an amenity.

=== The railway ===
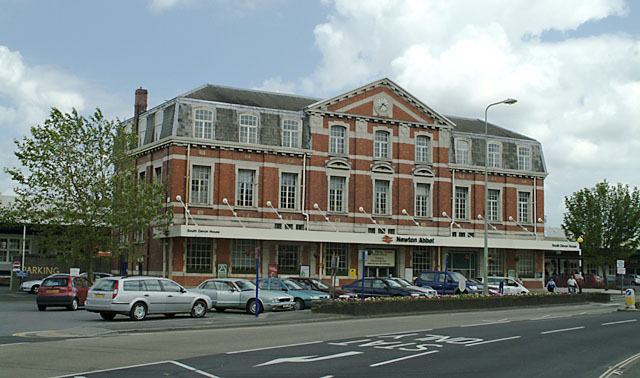
Newton Abbot railway station

The South Devon railway reached Newton Abbot in 1846 and changed it from simply a market town with associated trades (leather and wool) into an industrial base. The South Devon Railway Company opened the station on 30 December 1846. A branch to Torquay was added on 18 December 1848, with one to Moretonhampstead on 26 June 1866, although the latter has since closed to passengers. Isambard Kingdom Brunel used the Teignmouth/Newton Abbot section to experiment with his atmospheric railway. The experiment failed, but the remains of Brunel's pumping house survive at Starcross and the old Dairy Crest milk processing factory in Totnes.

In 1876, the Great Western Railway bought up the railways and developed the repair and maintenance sheds into a substantial works. Extensive sidings were also built making a large marshalling yard. The present station was rebuilt to its current form in 1927 to designs by Chief GWR Architect P. E. Culverhouse. The large clock was a gift from the people of the town.

During the late 1980s, the number of passenger platforms was reduced from around nine down to five, and only three of these are still used for scheduled trains. The remaining platforms were shortened on the southern side and the number of tracks reduced to make way for a new station car park. The South Devon Railway Engineering works was decommissioned and replaced by Brunel Industrial Estate. Of the two buildings that survived into the 21st century, only one remains intact, as the old sheds burned down on 21 October 2018.

Many other industries were set up beside the railway station, including a timber yard, iron and brass foundries, and an engineering works. Newton Abbot power station was built adjacent to the line on the Moretonhampstead branch. The town's population increased from 1,623 in 1801 to 12,518 by 1901. Terraced streets were built to house the workers, and attractive villas sprang up around the town for the wealthier.

=== Modern history ===
Two Royal Navy personnel from Newton Abbot were among the first British casualties in World War I, being killed after their ship was torpedoed by a German U-boat. Over the course of the two world wars, more than 250 Newtonian men gave their lives for the British Empire. They are remembered on the town's war memorial. a further eleven Commonwealth soldiers are also buried in the town. The town was bombed from the air twice during World War II, killing a total of 21 people. There was a severe flood on 27 December 1979, the latest in a long series, when the River Lemon burst its banks after prolonged rain.

Tucked into a corner of the racecourse, Newton Abbot's stock-car track flourished for nearly 30 years and attracted fans and drivers from all over the South of England. A short 300-metre oval track, it featured races for the cars of the BriSCA organization, as well as saloons and "bangers".

A new community hospital to replace the one in East Street was built at the end of Jetty Marsh Road and opened on 12 January 2009.

The Flag of Newton Abbot was adopted in 2009 by the town council. It depicts a stylised image of St Leonard's Tower in the centre of a modified flag of Devon. Henry Cole, of Newton Abbot Town Council, stated that the "green represents the moors, black for the granite and white for the clay" of the surrounding area. The cross of St Petroc is also used to represent a major crossroads in the town which converged on the clock tower. The arm of the cross represent the routes to Exeter and London, Bovey Tracey and the moors, Totnes and Plymouth, and Torquay and Brixham.

In 2023, a survey by The Daily Telegraph named Newton Abbot as one of the ugliest towns in Britain.

== Governance ==
There are three tiers of local government covering Newton Abbot, at parish, district and county level: Newton Abbot Town Council, Teignbridge District Council and Devon County Council.

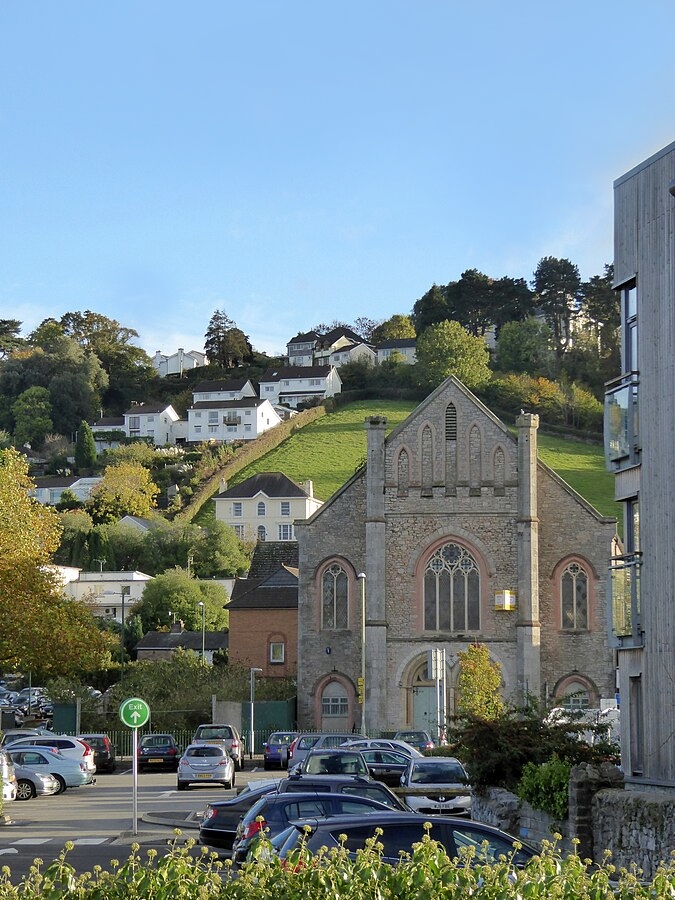
Newton's Place, formerly St Leonard's Church: Town Council's headquarters since 2021.

The town council, which was previously based at the old town hall in Devon Square, is now based at Newton's Place at 43 Wolborough Street, which had been built in 1835 as St Leonard's Church (replacing the nearby medieval church of the same name which was demolished shortly afterwards apart from its tower). The former church at 43 Wolborough Street was converted to a museum, community space and town council headquarters, with the first council meeting in the building being held in June 2021. The building was formally opened on 1 April 2023. Teignbridge District Council also has its offices in the town, at Forde House.

Newton Abbot was historically part of the parish of Wolborough. A local government district covering the parish was established in 1864, governed by the Wolborough Local Board. Such local boards were reconstituted as urban district councils in 1894. Ahead of that change, the outgoing local board requested a change of name from Wolborough to Newton Abbot, recognising that Newton Abbot was the main settlement in the district, and so the Wolborough Local Board was replaced by Newton Abbot Urban District Council. The urban district was enlarged in 1901 to take in the parish of Highweek (which included the town's suburb of Newton Bushel on the north bank of the River Lemon) and the Milber area east of the Aller Brook, which had previously been in the parish of Haccombe with Combe. From 1901 to 1974 the Newton Abbot Urban District covered the three civil parishes of Wolborough, Highweek and Milber. As urban parishes the three parishes did not have their own parish councils, but were administered directly by Newton Abbot Urban District Council.

Newton Abbot Urban District was abolished in 1974 with the area becoming part of the new district of Teignbridge. A successor parish called Newton Abbot was established covering the whole of the former urban district, with its council taking the name Newton Abbot Town Council.

Newton Abbot is the main town in the Newton Abbot parliamentary constituency. The constituency was created in 2010, when it was won by the Conservative, Anne-Marie Morris. However, Morris was subsequently unseated by the Liberal Democrat, Martin Wrigley at the 2024 general election.

Newton Abbot has two seats on Devon County Council, for Newton Abbot North and Newton Abbot South.

== Education ==
Coombeshead Academy is a comprehensive school in Coombeshead Road. It is a trust school and a specialist media and arts college for some 1,442 pupils aged 11 to 18.

Newton Abbot College, also a comprehensive school in Old Exeter Road. It came into being on 1 September 2008 as a renaming of Knowles Hill School. It is a specialist Technology College for around 1,200 pupils aged 11 to 18.

South Devon UTC is a university technical college in Kingsteignton Road, established on 1 September 2015 for pupils aged 14 to 19.

The local primary schools include St Joseph's Roman Catholic Primary, Highweek Community Primary and Nursery school, Decoy Primary, as well as Bearnes Primary, Canada Hill Primary, Wolborough C of E Primary, Bradley Barton Primary, Haytor View Primary and All Saints Marsh CofE Academy.

== Areas ==
The Newton Abbot civil parish has grown to include the areas of Highweek (to the north-west) and Wolborough (to the south). Other areas and suburbs include Abbotsbury, Aller Park, Broadlands, Buckland, Decoy, Knowles Hill, Milber, Mile End and Newtake. In more recent years there have been highly disputed newer housing developments around the outskirts of the town, including Hele Park and Whitehill which have already been completed to the west and north of the town respectively, as well as planned developments at Houghton Barton (to the west) and Wolborough Barton (to the south) as part of a bigger plan to add almost 5,000 more houses to the town.

== Climate ==
Climate data for Newton Abbot (1959–1976 averages)
Month	Jan	Feb	Mar	Apr	May	Jun	Jul	Aug	Sep	Oct	Nov	Dec	Year
Mean daily maximum °C (°F)	9 (48)	9 (48)	11 (52)	13 (55)	16 (61)	19 (66)	21 (70)	21 (70)	18 (64)	15 (59)	12 (54)	10 (50)	15 (58)
Mean daily minimum °C (°F)	4 (39)	4 (39)	5 (41)	6 (43)	8 (46)	11 (52)	13 (55)	13 (55)	11 (52)	9 (48)	6 (43)	5 (41)	8 (46)
Average precipitation mm (inches)	109.8 (4.32)	83.6 (3.29)	80.6 (3.17)	62.6 (2.46)	64.7 (2.55)	55.7 (2.19)	56.5 (2.22)	62.1 (2.44)	68.9 (2.71)	107.5 (4.23)	104.7 (4.12)	122.1 (4.81)	978.8 (38.51)
Mean monthly sunshine hours	54.4	75.1	127.7	167.5	201.9	230.9	215.8	188.8	157.5	105.2	77.5	60.7	1,663

== Landmarks ==
=== Alexandra Theatre ===
The Alexandra Theatre was originally built in 1871 as a corn exchange at the end of the market building. Before it was finished, it was decided instead to use it as a meeting hall for the community. It remained as such until in 1883, when a major upgrade of the building included the addition of a stage with dressing rooms below, further dressing rooms in extensions at the side of the main building and an orchestra pit. Many other alterations followed until it was converted into a two-screen cinema in 1996.

=== St Leonard's Tower ===
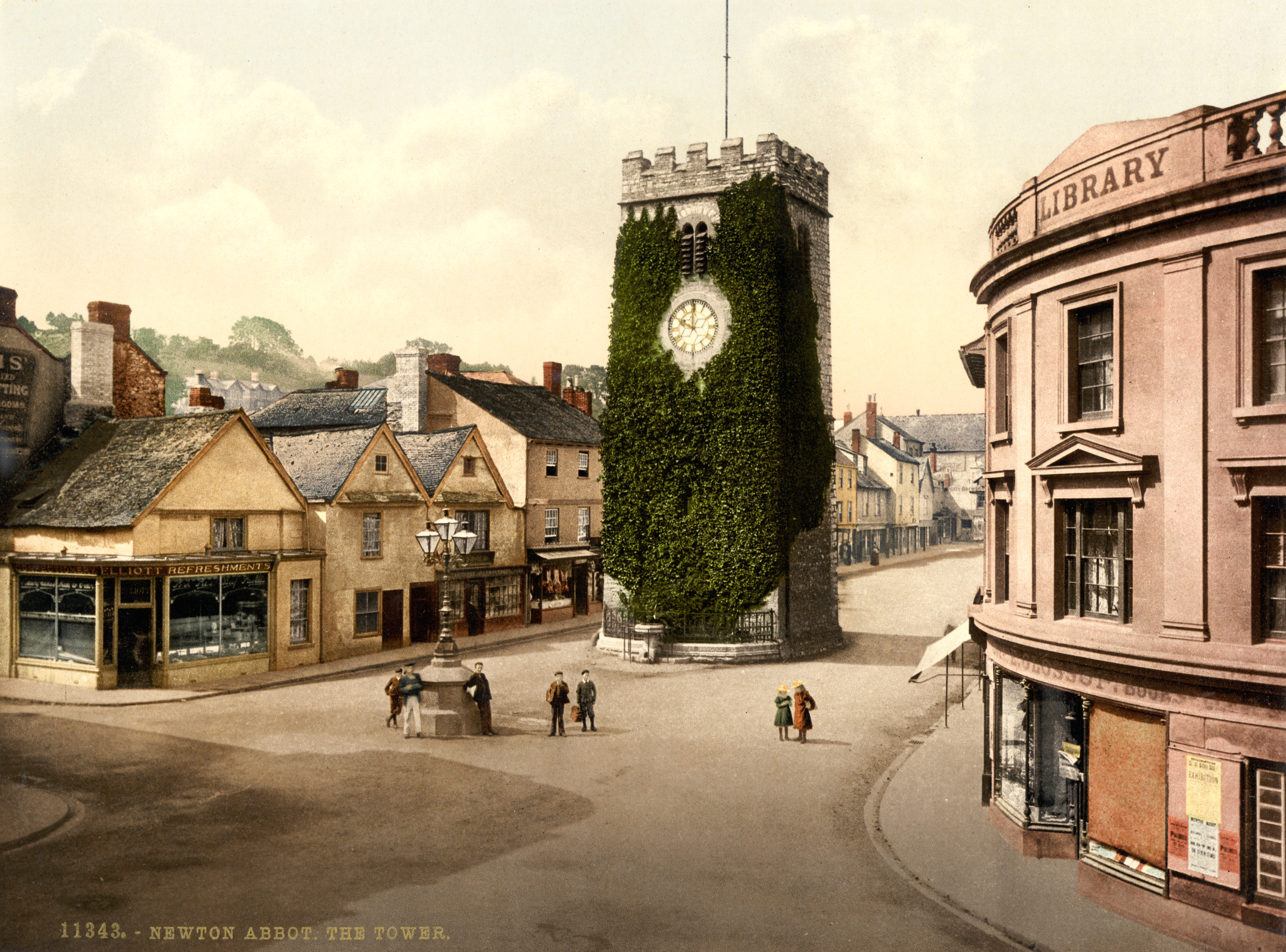
Photochrom of St Leonard's Tower, 1895

The centre of the town features the ancient tower of St Leonard; it is all that remains of the medieval chapel of St Leonard, founded in 1220 and first referred to in 1350 in a document of the Bishop de Grandisson of Exeter. The main chapel was demolished in 1836 to ease traffic congestion. Adjacent to the tower is a plaque marking where the first declaration of the newly arrived William III, Prince of Orange was read in 1688:

The first declaration of William III, Prince of Orange, the glorious defender of the Protestant religion and the liberties of England, was read on this pedestal by the Rev. John Reynell, rector of this parish, 5th November, 1688.

Although William arrived in Brixham on 5 November, he did not reach Newton Abbot until 6 November, when he stayed overnight at Forde House as he made his way to London to take the English throne.

The tower can regularly be seen flying the Union Flag or the Flag of Newton Abbot (The Flag of Devon defaced by the silhouette of the tower).

=== Forde House ===
Forde House (now known as Old Forde House) lies in the south-east corner of the town in the parish of Wolborough. The present house was built in 1610 by Richard Reynell (who later became Sir Richard Reynell) and his wife Lucy. It was built with an E-shaped floor plan thought to be in honour of Queen Elizabeth I, who had recently died. The grounds were originally extensive, including all of what is called Decoy (as wildfowl were decoyed there to extend the house's larder), a deer park known locally as Buckland, which is now home to a housing estate, and the iBounce trampoline park.

In 1625, King Charles I stayed at the house overnight on his way to inspect the fleet at Plymouth. He returned a few days later for a further two nights. Forde House gave shelter to Oliver Cromwell and Colonel Fairfax while on their way to besiege Royalist Dartmouth in 1646. In 1648 the estate passed to the Courtenay family through the marriage of Margaret (only daughter of Jane Reynell and Sir William Waller) to Sir William Courtenay, lord of nearby Powderham Castle. William of Orange stayed at the house in 1688 on the way to his coronation in London, having landed in Brixham. The house remained the main residence of a succession of Courtenays until 1762, when it was let to a string of occupiers.

The Courtenay family sold the house in 1936 to Stephen Simpson, who sold it two years later to Mrs M. Sellick. Teignbridge District Council bought the house in 1978 and remains the current owners. It has been refurbished for use as office and conference space, and for weddings and other social events.

=== Bradley Manor ===
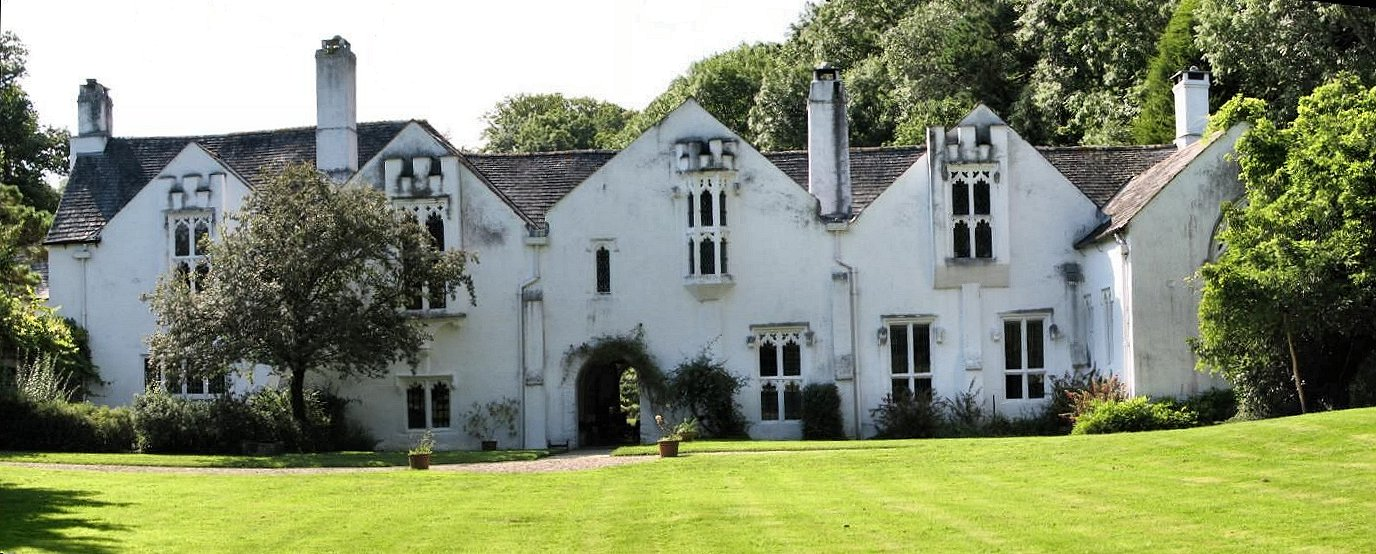
The east front of Bradley Manor

At the opposite end of Newton Abbot is a National Trust property, Bradley Manor. This 15th-century (c. 1420) manor house in a secluded woodland setting has a notable great hall emblazoned with the royal coat of arms of Elizabeth I. Nearby is Bakers Park.

The Great Western Railway named a 7800 class steam locomotive after the manor, but the engine was never based in Newton Abbot (shed code: 83A) and was withdrawn from mainline service in the 1965. It was restored in the 1980s and passed through Newton Abbot on special runs called The Torbay Express and The Mayflower.

=== Passmore Edwards Public Library ===
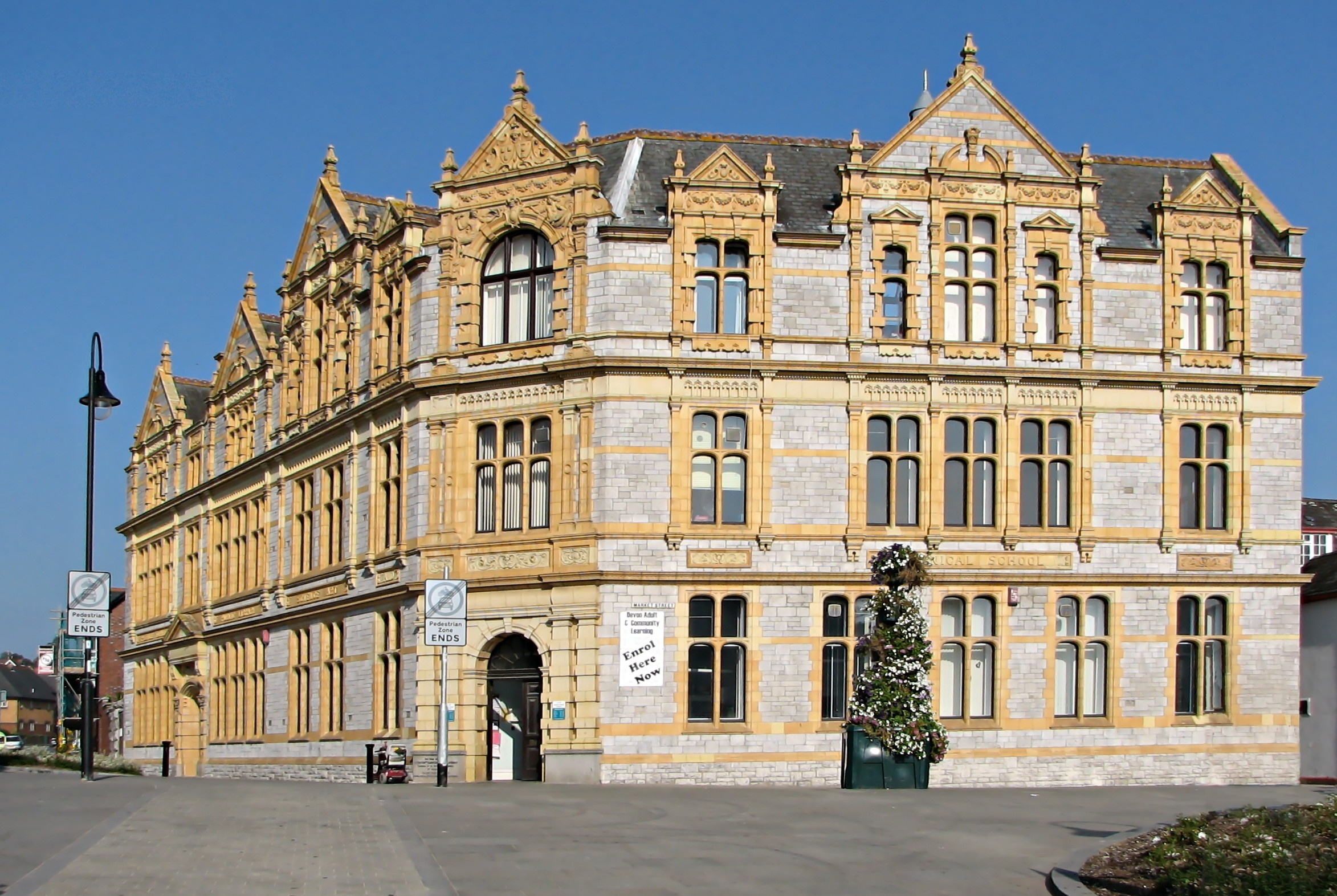
Passmore Edwards Public Library

John Passmore Edwards originally wanted a hospital built for the town in memory of his mother, who was born there, but as the town already had a hospital, he decided on a public library, which opened in 1904. The building, designed by the Cornish architect Silvanus Trevail, is among the most impressive in Newton Abbot. It originally housed a Science, Art and Technical School, which the council added. The elaborate Renaissance style includes yellow terracotta mouldings over windows and doorways. Passmore Edwards donated £2,500, and the County Council and public donations paid for the rest. Renovated in 2010–2012, it was renamed the Passmore Edwards Centre after its benefactor and to reflect its future as a multi-purpose facility. It works closely with Coombeshead Academy.

=== Almshouses ===
The several sets of almshouses in Newton Abbot include:

- Gilberd's in Exeter Road were endowed in 1538 by John Gilberd of Compton Castle to house lepers. The five houses reputedly had sloping floors to help in washing out the houses. Eight modern apartments with a common room and visitors bedroom now occupy the site, administered by the Feoffees of Highweek.
- In 1576, Robert Hayman set up several houses for the poor in East Street; these were rebuilt in 1840.
- Reynell's almshouses, built in 1640 beside Torquay Road, housed four clergy widows ("the relicts of preaching ministers, left poor, without a house of their own"). They were rebuilt in 1845.
- Mackrell's almshouses in Wolborough Street were built in 1874 by J. W. Rowell. Mackrell was a native of Newton Abbot who made his fortune as a chemist in Barnstaple. Mackrell also funded a home in the Forde Park area for the "fallen women of Newton Abbot", housing single mothers fallen on hard times.

=== The workhouse ===
The original Newton Abbot poorhouse was in East Street. The cellar of the Devon Arms was used as the oakum picking room, where paupers were given the unpleasant job of untwisting old rope to provide oakum, used to seal the seams of wooden boats. Newton Bushel had its own poorhouse, not far from present day Newton Abbot Leisure Centre, previously known as Dyron's.

The 1834 Poor Law Act required changes and incorporation that led, in 1839, to a new workhouse being built in East Street for paupers from surrounding areas. In time, the workhouse became more of a hospital for the sick, infirm and aged poor.

=== Tucker's Maltings ===
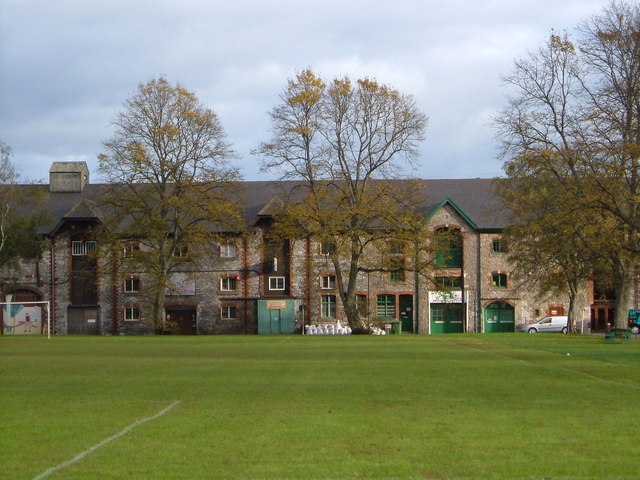
Tucker's Maltings

Close to the railway station is the former Tucker's Maltings, long the only traditional malthouse in the UK open to the public. The malt house produced malt for over 30 breweries and enough to brew 15,000,000 imperial pints (8,500 m^{3}) of beer per annum. Although closing as a malthouse in 2018, the maltings is now home to a number of businesses, including The Maltings Taphouse, a craft beer bar and cultural venue.

=== Cider bar ===
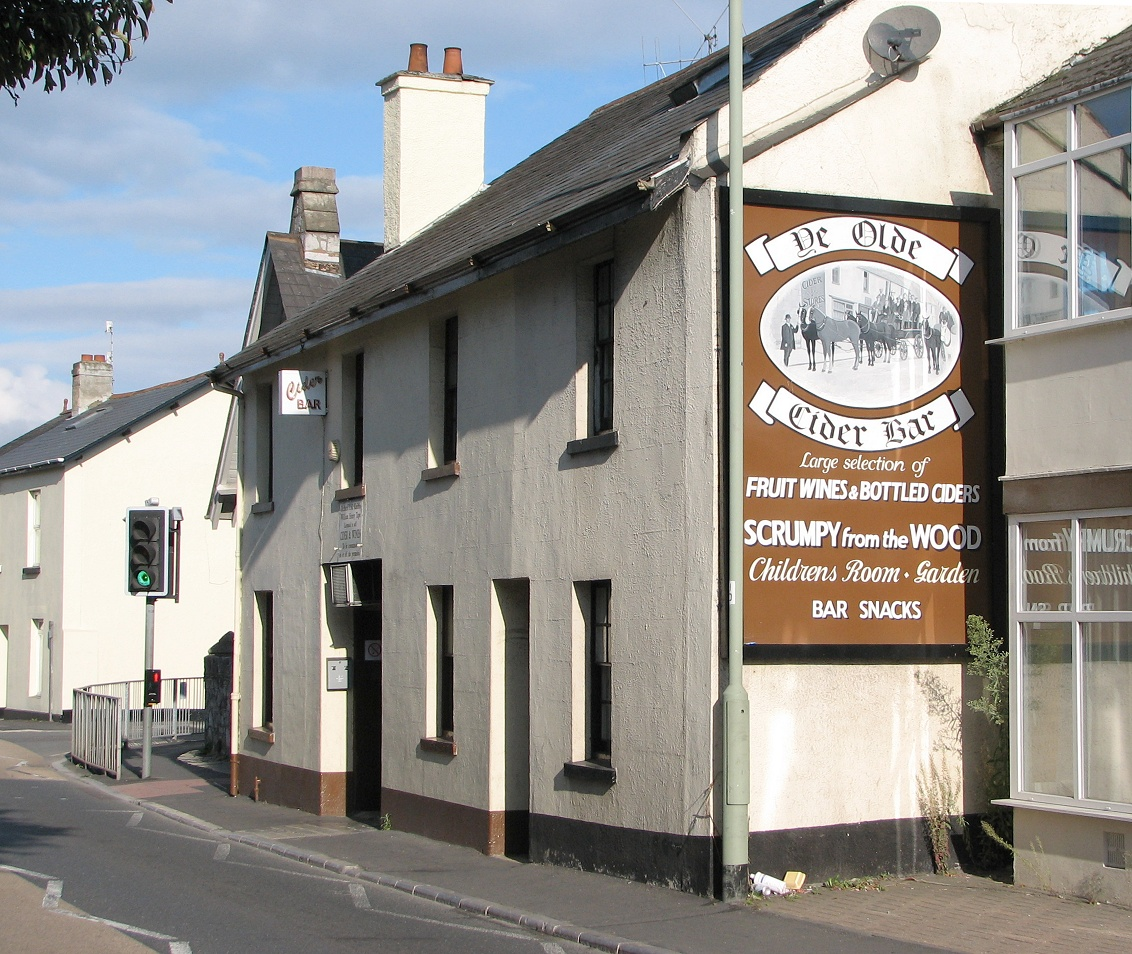
Ye Olde Cider Bar

Said to be one of only two remaining cider houses in the United Kingdom, Ye Olde Cider Bar in East Street sells only cider, perry, country wines and soft drinks. Its interior and simple wooden furniture remain relatively unchanged.

=== Newton Abbot Town & GWR Museum ===
After a 2019 relocation, the museum is now in the Newton's Place community centre in Newfoundland Way. It displays the history of Newton Abbot and of the Great Western Railway.

=== Newton Abbot War Memorial ===
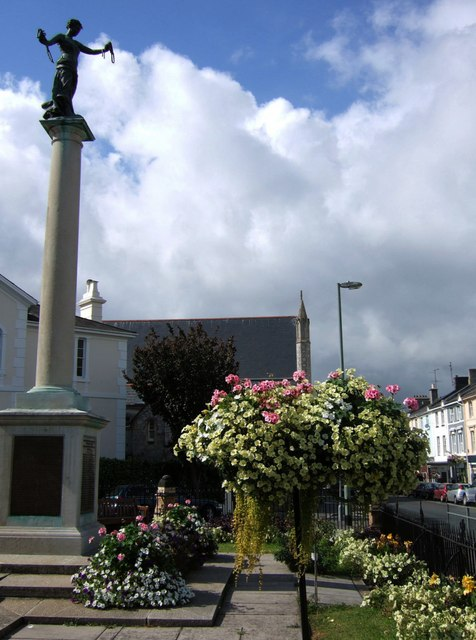
Newton Abbot War Memorial

In 1922, Newton Abbot Urban District Council instructed its borough surveyor, Coleridge Dingley White, to design a town memorial reflecting the town's importance and the contribution of its young men to the war effort The unveiling and dedication took place on Sunday 23 July 1922.

== Transport ==
=== Railway ===
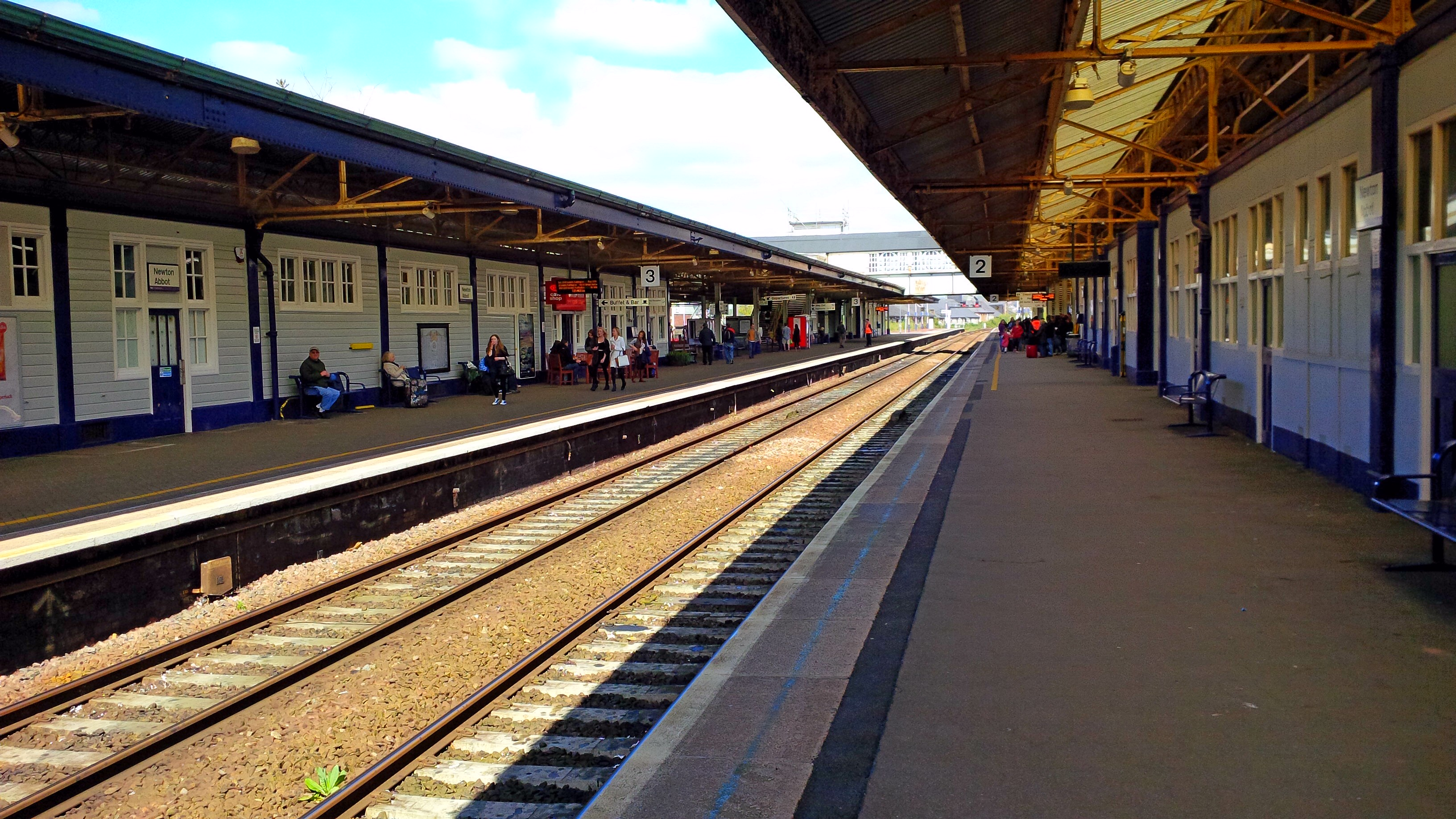
Interior of Newton Abbot station

Newton Abbot railway station stands at the east end of Queen Street. It provides both local and long-distance train services between the South West, South Wales, London, the Midlands, the North East and Scotland.

The main line service to/from London Paddington is operated by Great Western Railway and runs at least hourly for much of the day. Half-hourly local trains run from Exmouth and Exeter to Paignton.

CrossCountry services operate through Birmingham to Manchester, the north-east of England (Leeds & Newcastle) and Scotland (Glasgow Central, Dundee & Aberdeen).

=== Bus services ===
The main bus operator is Stagecoach South West who run a network of regular services from Newton Abbot to places such as Exeter, Torquay, Paignton and Teignmouth. Local independent operator, Country Bus also run a significant number of services from the Town.

=== Roads ===
Newton Abbot has a connection to the A380 dual carriageway, which leads to the M5 motorway via the A38.

Other A roads connected to the town are:

- A381 from Teignmouth to Salcombe, through Newton Abbot
- A382 starting at Newton Abbot, and heading through Bovey Tracey to Whiddon Down
- A383 from Newton Abbot through Bickington where it joins the A38 southbound

== Media ==
Local TV coverage is provided by BBC South West and ITV West Country. Television signals are received from the Beacon Hill and the local relay transmitters.

Local radio stations are BBC Radio Devon on 104.3 FM, Heart West on 96.4, Greatest Hits Radio Devon on 105.5 FM and Radio Exe Devon on DAB

The town is served by the local newspaper, Mid-Devon Advertiser which publishes on Thursdays.

== Sport and leisure ==
Newton Abbot has two non-League football clubs: Buckland Athletic F.C., which plays at Homers Heath, and Newton Abbot Spurs A.F.C., which plays at the Recreation Ground. The headquarters of Devon County Football Association are in the town.

Newton Abbot's South Devon Cricket Club was established in 1851 and also plays at the Recreation Ground.

The town has a long-standing rugby union club, Newton Abbot RFC (established 1873), which plays home games at Rackerhayes in nearby Kingsteignton.

Two greyhound racing tracks existed; the Newton Abbot Greyhound Track lasted from 1974 to 2005 and a short-lived track was laid on the Recreation Ground, where Newton Abbot Spurs plays today. The racing was independent (unaffiliated to the sports governing body, the National Greyhound Racing Club) and so both were known as flapping tracks, a name given to independent tracks. Distances there were 250, 450 and 460 yards and racing lasted about five years.

== Notable people ==
- Robert Hayman (1575–1629), poet, and Governor of Newfoundland
- John Lethbridge (1675–1759), invented a diving salvage machine
- Nicholas Nepean (1757–1823), soldier and civil servant in Nova Scotia, died locally
- Solomon Ezekiel (1781–1867), English Jewish writer.
- Sir Samuel Baker, (1821–1893) explorer, big-game hunter, writer and abolitionist, bought the Sandford Orleigh estate in 1874.
- Anna Harriett Drury (1824–1912), local novelist, poet and writer of boys' stories
- Rev. Townsend Warner (1841–1902), cricketer and local headmaster.
- William Knox D'Arcy (1849–1917), co-founded the Persian petroleum industry
- Oliver Heaviside (1850–1925), physicist, lived locally
- Frank Matcham (1854–1920), architect of theatres.
- General Sir Leslie Rundle (1856–1934), a British Army general
- George Marshall-Hall (1862–1915), musician, composer and local teacher.
- Sir Arthur Quiller-Couch (1863–1944), writer and literary critic, brought up locally.
- Robert Cyril Layton Perkins (1866–1955), entomologist, retired here in 1912.
- Paris Singer (1867–1932), real estate developer and philanthropist, brought up locally.
- Colonel Percy Fawcett (1867–1925), geographer, Army officer, cartographer, archaeologist and explorer of South America
- Bertram Fletcher Robinson (1870–1907), writer, editor and sportsman, brought up locally.
- Athelstan Cornish-Bowden (1871–1942), local land surveyor.
- Samuel Walkey (1871–1953), author of a number of children’s books, worked locally, lived in Keyberry Park from 1906 to 1921.
- Major-General Sir Hugh Tudor (1871–1965), British Army officer
- Ivy Williams (1877–1966), the first woman to be called to the English bar
- John Angel, (1881–1960), designed the Exeter War Memorial and emigrated to North America, where he carved .
- Fred Thompson (1884–1949), writer and librettist, raised locally.
- John Baptist Lucius Noel (1890–1989), mountaineer and film-maker, filmed the 1924 British Mount Everest expedition
- Norah Baring (1905–1985), movie actress, studied at Newton Abbot Art School.
- Paul Mount (1922—2009), a local modernist sculptor
- Rupert Neve (1926–2021), audio electronics engineer and entrepreneur
- Geoffrey Wareham (1929–2022), journalist and broadcaster.
- David St John Thomas (1929–2014), writer and publisher, ran publishing house David & Charles here from 1960s.
- David Vine (1935–2009), TV sports presenter, covered snooker
- Anthea Redfern (born 1948), TV hostess.
- David Knopfler (born 1952), the co-founder of the rock band Dire Straits lives in Wolborough.
- Peter Truscott, Baron Truscott (born 1959), peer, petroleum and mining consultant, and writer.
- Sergio Pizzorno (born 1980), guitarist and songwriter with band Kasabian
- Jon Lee (born 1982), singer and actor grew up locally.
- Sport
- Frank Harry (1876–1925), first-class cricketer, played 76 games
- Edith Mayne (1905–1953), freestyle swimmer
- Don Bird (1908–1987), footballer, played over 100 games.
- Len Coldwell (1933–1996), cricketer, played 310 First-class cricket games.
- Ollie Watkins (born 1995), footballer, played over 400 games including 214 for Aston Villa and 20 for England, lived here between 1995 and 2017.

== Freedom of the Town ==
The following people and military units have received the Freedom of the Town of Newton Abbot:

=== Military Units ===
- HMS Triumph, RN: 1 April 2023.

== Twin towns – sister cities ==
Newton Abbot is twinned with:

- Aÿ-Champagne, France.
- Besigheim, Germany.

== See also ==
- Puritan's Pit
- A380 road
- A381 road
- A382 road

== Sources ==
- Beavis, Derek (1985). Newton Abbot, The Story of the Town's Past. Buckingham: Barracuda Books. ISBN 0-86023-236-0.
- Cherry, Bridget; Pevsner, Nikolaus (1989). The Buildings of England: Devon (second ed.). Penguin Books. pp. 584–595. ISBN 0-14-071050-7.
- Hoskins, W. G. (1954). A New Survey of England – Devon. London: Collins. pp. 441–443.
- Jones, Roger (1986). A Book of Newton Abbot. Bradford on Avon, Wiltshire: Ex Libris Press. ISBN 0-948578-06-8.
- O'Hagan, Mary (1990). A History of Forde House. Frome, Somerset: Butler & Tanner Ltd.
