= St Leonard's Tower =

St Leonard's Tower may refer to a number of buildings.

- St Leonard's Tower, Newton Abbot, Devon.
- St Leonard's Tower, West Malling, Kent
