= Old Newton Abbot Hospital =

Newton Abbot Hospital
- Torbay and Southern Devon Health and Care NHS Trust
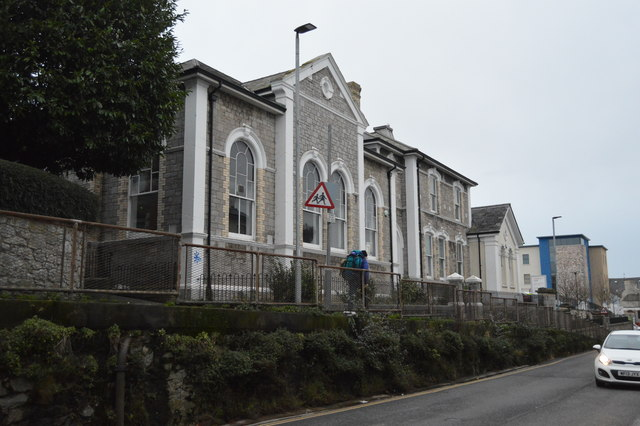
- Newton Abbot Hospital

- Shown in Devon

Geography
- Location: East Street, Newton Abbot, Devon, England
- Coordinates: 50.5287°N 3.6072°W

Organisation
- Care system: NHS
- Type: Community

History
- Founded: 1837
- Closed: 2009

Links
- Lists: Hospitals in England

The old Newton Abbot Hospital was a health facility in East Street, Newton Abbot, Devon, England. It was managed by Torbay and Southern Devon Health and Care NHS Trust. The main entrance block is a Grade II listed building.

== History ==
The facility, which was designed by Sir George Gilbert Scott and William Bonython Moffatt, opened as the Newton Abbot Union Workhouse in 1837. A new infirmary building, designed by Samuel Segar, was added in 1871. An inquiry by the Local Government Board in 1894 found that some elderly patients were placed naked into sacks known as "jumpers" and that this treatment had led to the death of at least one such patient.

In January 1907, the notable writer and editor, Bertram Fletcher Robinson, bequeathed £1,000 in-trust (equivalent to £99,500 in 2023) for a "Fletcher Robinson Bed". His father, Joseph Fletcher Robinson (1827-1903), had been a prominent member of the committee of the Newton Abbot Hospital and was also a generous benefactor.

In 1930, the Old Newton Abbot Hospital was renamed as the Newton Abbot Public Assistance Institution and during 1948, it was subsumed by the National Health Service. After services transferred to Newton Abbot Community Hospital in 2009, the campus was closed and part of the main building was converted into a Sainsbury's Local retail outlet.
