= Devon Studio School =

School in Torquay, Devon, England

Coordinates: 50.4845°N 3.5546°W

Devon Studio school was a Studio school and 6th form for boys and girls, located on Newton Road in Torquay, Devon, England in the grounds of Torbay Hospital. It was a small school with roughly 300 student places and was designed for students between the ages of 14 and 19, that were more practical rather than academic. It was health- and social- care based and offered A levels in psychology and some sciences.

The first Ofsted inspection of the school, which was carried out in June 2015 rated it as "requiring improvement". The school closed in August 2017.
