= Exeter College, Devon =

Coordinates: 50°43′42″N 3°32′19″W

Exeter College
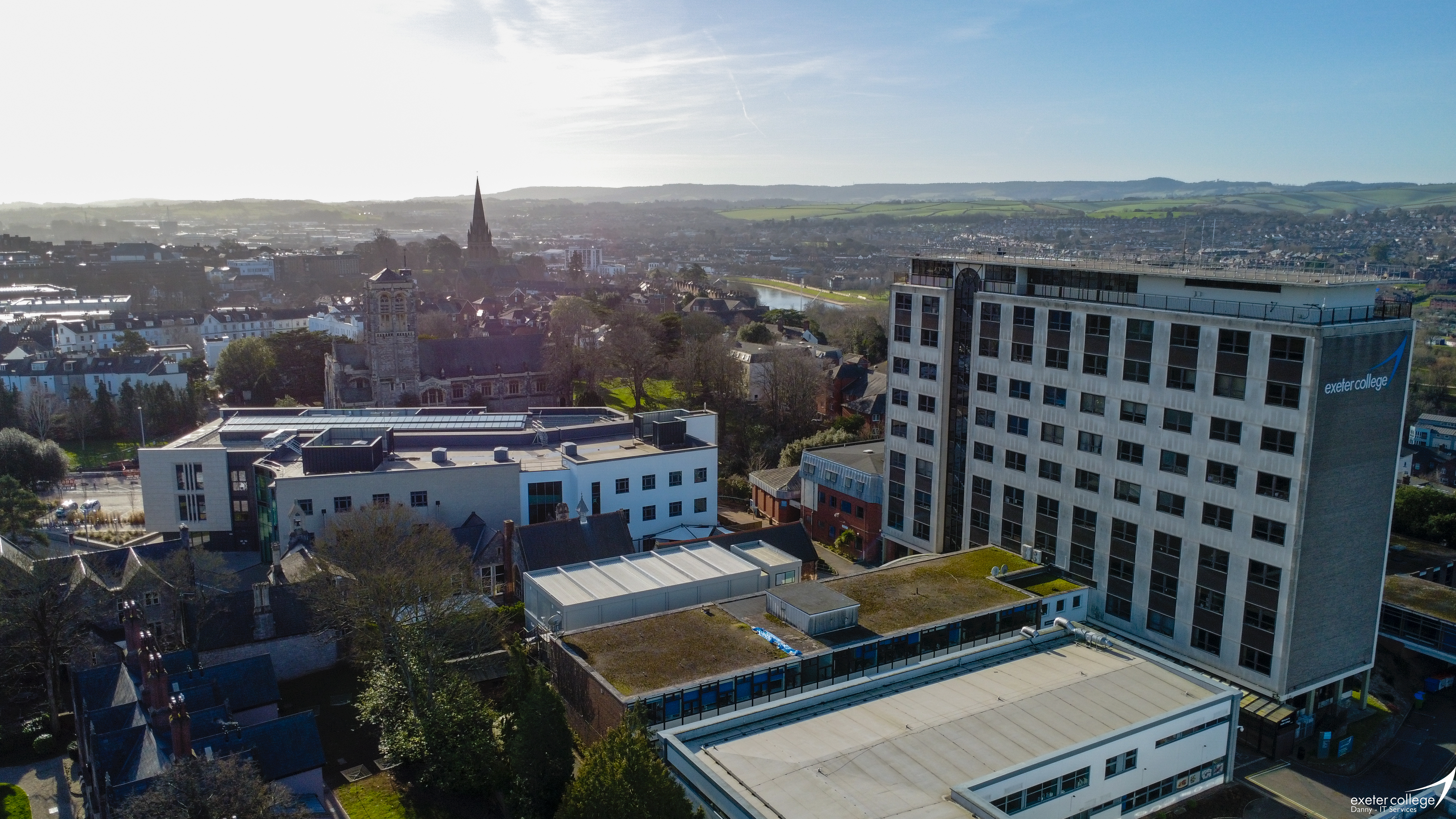
- Hele Road EX4 4JS; Exeter, Devon; England

Information
- Type: Tertiary college
- Established: 1893; 1970 (as F.E. College)
- Department for Education URN: 130645 Tables
- Ofsted: Reports
- Gender: Mixed
- Age: 16+
- Enrolment: 7,520 (as of January 2022)
- Language: English
- Website: https://exe-coll.ac.uk/

Exeter College is a general further education college in Exeter, Devon; it was the first such college in England, and was the highest-ranked in the country in 2017. The college has its origins in the Royal Albert Memorial Museum, founded in 1869, and first became an independent institution in 1893 as the Exeter Technical and University Extension College. After using various different sites, the college's preceding institution moved into its current main campus in 1959, and was established in its present form as the first English further education college in 1970.

The college is based around a campus at Hele Road and several other sites around the city, educating approximately twelve thousand students. This includes both sixteen to eighteen-year-olds and mature (adult) students. In addition, Exeter College jointly runs the specialist Exeter Mathematics School with the University of Exeter, with the college providing extra-curricular activities and pastoral support, and with students at the Maths School able to study one A-level at the college. The tower block at the Hele Road campus, completed in 1963, is the third-tallest building in Exeter.

== History ==
=== Origins, 1869-1893 ===
Exeter College can trace its origins back to the opening of the Royal Albert Memorial Museum (RAMM) in 1869. At its opening, the RAMM included a School of Science and a School of Art. In January 1891, the local government decided to use the Technical Instruction Act 1889 to either found a new technical institution in the city or to fund lectures and courses in the RAMM's two schools. The latter option was chosen, and by June three such lectures had taken place "for the furtherance of technical education among working men", attended by six hundred and sixty people; the local University Extension Committee had sponsored two further "people's lectures", attended by nine hundred people in total. The scheme was subject to some criticism for being poorly planned.

=== Exeter College, 1970-present ===
In September 1970, Exeter Technical College became the first tertiary college in England, combining the features of a typical further education college with a sixth form college. It renamed itself to the Exeter College of Further Education.

In February 1972, the college was renamed to Exeter College, and it was given approval to offer the International Baccalaureate in December 1992.

Victoria House, opposite Exeter Central railway station, was purchased by the college in June 1995, and is still in use to this day.

After an inspection in 2000 by the FE Funding Council, the college was declared "one of the best in the west".

In 2012 the technology centre opened, followed by the gym and dance studio in 2019. The Centre for Law and Social Sciences opened in 2026.

In January 2019, the college announced it would be spending £70 million on altering the Hele Road site, including demolishing the tower block and allowing the public to cross through the campus to Exeter St Davids railway station.

In January 2026, the college merged with PETROC (now North Devon College) to form the Exeter and North Devon Colleges Group.

== Buildings and sites ==
=== Centre for Creative Industries ===
The Centre for Creative Industries is a building dedicated to the creative arts. This includes film and media, physical art, photography and radio broadcasting. It also contains the BBC Exeter studios.

=== Centre for Music and Performance ===
The Centre for Music and Performance is the college's centre for non physical or digital art, and mostly teaches the performing arts and music. They have purpose built dance floors and rehearsal rooms.

=== Digital and Data Centre ===
The Digital and Data Centre is located on the Hele Road site, containing IT suites, seminar spaces and digital learning laboratories. The building teaches Information technology and other digital courses.

=== Construction Centre ===
The Construction Centre (also known as Falcon House) is the college's hub for construction, which hosts bricklaying, retrofitting, joinery, plumbing, carpentry, and more. Unlike most other Exeter college locations, it is not within walking distance of the city centre and instead is located in Sowton industrial estate.

=== Exwick Sports Pavilion ===
Exwick Sports Pavilion is a sport facility containing a 3G AstroTurf pitch, tennis facilities, six badminton courts, two classrooms, a sports therapy room and a gym.

=== Future Skills Centre ===
The Future Skills Centre is a building owned jointly by the college and Devon County Council. It was previously owned by Flybe and used as a training academy. Currently, travel and tourism classes study there, alongside aeronautical engineering due to its proximity to the airport. It also has a small non-flying aircraft which is maintained by the students. Second year T-level Design, Surveying and Planning students also attend this campus, due to Falcon House being at capacity. The building also hosts meetings and sessions, as well as police training.

=== Haven Banks Outdoor Education Centre ===
Haven Banks is situated on Exeter Quay, and runs sailing, canoeing, kayaking, archery, first aid and team building activities.

=== Hele Road site ===
The Hele Road site, which is the main college site, comprises the Tower and Hele buildings, the adjoining Digital and Data Centre and a number of other smaller buildings. The bulk of the college's administration and teaching is situated on-site.

=== Maths and Science Centre ===
The Maths and Science Centre contains 11 science laboratories, a forensics suite, a large computing lab and many specialist classrooms. The building hosts maths, science, psychology and criminology courses.

=== Sports hall, gym and dance studio ===
The Sports hall, gym and dance studio is a large building with space for dance, exercise and other sport activities.

=== Technology Centre ===
The Technology Centre hosts aerospace, engineering and automotive students. It has a CAD suite with over 24 computers, CNC machines and other high tech equipment. It has the largest virtual welding facility in Europe and five 3D printers.

=== Victoria House ===
Victoria House teaches business, IT, sports and leisure and tourism courses. IT suites can be found throughout the building.

=== Tiverton Campus ===
As a result of the merger of Exeter College and Petroc, the former East Devon College campus in Tiverton became a satellite campus of the main college bearing the Exeter College branding.

== Student life ==
Many of the college's buildings and campuses are located near the city centre, providing amenities to students after or in-between lessons. There are many clubs and societies, ranging from self defence to beach cleans and student-led clubs, such as the book club or the LGBTQIA+ student group. There is a gym available to students from 7am to 7pm each day on weekdays.

== Notable alumni ==
- Matt Bellamy, musician
- Alistair Brammer, actor
- Michael Caines, chef and owner of Lympstone Manor
- Jim Causley, folk musician
- Elliott Frear, footballer
- Lande Hekt, musician
- Conrad Humphreys, professional yachtsman
- Luke Newberry, actor
- Jo Pavey, Olympic long-distance runner
- Luke Pearce, English rugby union referee
- Joe Talbot, lead singer in Idles
- Josh Widdicombe, comedian
- Marie Goldman, Member of Parliament for Chelmsford since 2024
