= Saint Petroc =

Sub-Roman abbot and saint

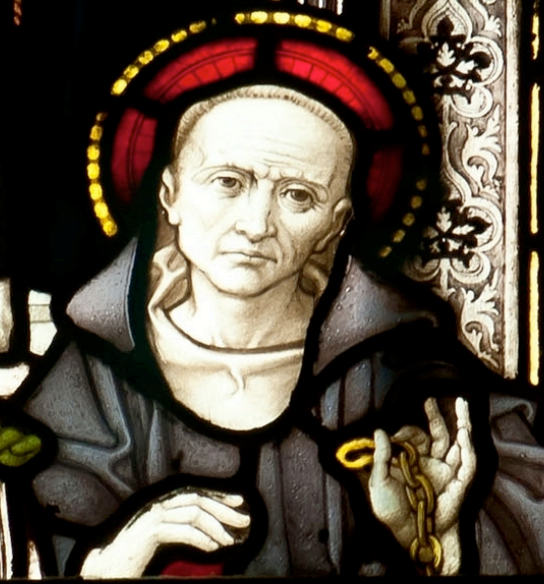

Abbot of Lanwethinoc
- Born: c. 468; Wales
- Died: c. 564; Treravel, Padstow, Cornwall, England
- Venerated in: Catholic Church; Anglican Communion; Eastern Orthodox Church
- Canonized: Pre-Congregation
- Major shrine: St Petroc's Church, Bodmin, Cornwall, England
- Feast: 4 June
- Attributes: Wolf, stag, church
- Patronage: Devon, Cornwall

Petroc or Petrock (Medieval Latin: Petrocus; Welsh: Pedrog; French: Perreux; c. 468 – c. 564) was a British prince and Christian saint.

Probably born in South Wales, he primarily ministered to the Britons of Devon (Dewnens) and Cornwall (Kernow) then forming the kingdom of Dumnonia where he is associated with a monastery at Padstow, which is named after him (Pedroc-stowe, or 'Petrock's Place'). Padstow appears to have been his earliest major cult centre, but Bodmin became the major centre for his veneration when his relics were moved to the monastery there in the later ninth century. Bodmin monastery became one of the wealthiest Cornish foundations by the eleventh century. There is a second ancient dedication to him nearby at Little Petherick or "Saint Petroc Minor".

In Devon ancient dedications total a probable seventeen (plus Timberscombe just over the border in Somerset), mostly coastal and including one within the old Roman walls of Exeter as well as the villages of Petrockstowe and Newton St Petroc. In Wales his name is commemorated at St Petrox near Pembroke, Ferwig near Cardigan and Llanbedrog on the Llŷn Peninsula. He also became a popular saint in Brittany by the end of the tenth century.

== Life ==
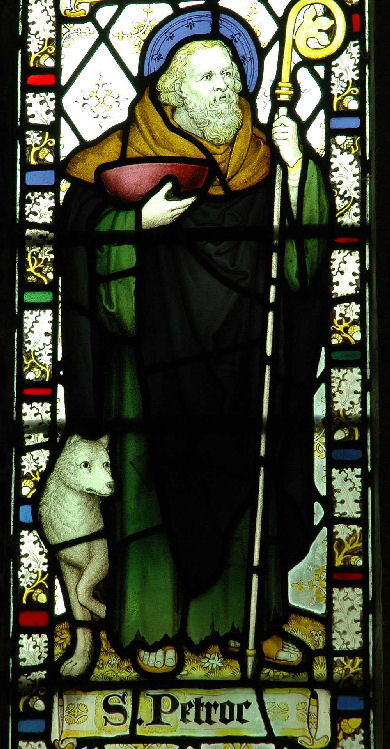
Detail of stained glass window at Bodmin showing St Petroc

The earliest Life of Petroc states that he was a younger son of an unnamed Welsh chieftain: the twelfth century version known as the Gotha Life, written at Bodmin, identifies that king as Glywys of Glywysing (Orme 2000, p. 215) and Petroc as a brother of Gwynllyw and uncle of Cadoc.

He studied in Ireland, where later he is said to have been the teacher of Kevin of Glendalough. He made a pilgrimage to Rome, and returning to Cornwall, the wind and tide brought him to Trebetherick. He founded a monastery and school at Lanwethinoc (the church of Wethinoc, an earlier holy man), at the mouth of the river Camel on the North Cornish Coast. It came to be called Petrocs-Stow (Petroc's Place), now Padstow.

Guron founded a hermitage at Bodmin, but left for the coast upon the arrival of Petroc. St Guron's Well is located at the western entrance to the churchyard of St Petroc's Church, Bodmin. All accounts indicate that Petroc retired from Padstow to Bodmin.

Petroc ministered throughout Dumnonia, which centred in Dewnans (Devon), and included Kernow (Cornwall), Somerset and Dorset. He also served in Brittany.

Petroc founded churches in Little Petherick and in many parts of Britain, Wales and Brittany. He is said to have converted Constantine of Cornwall to Christianity by saving a deer Constantine was hunting. Constantine later established a hermitage at what is now called Constantine Bay. After thirty years, legend says that Petroc went on the pilgrimage to Rome by way of Brittany. The place of his death was reputedly at a house belonging to a family named Rovel, thought to be a farm now called Treravel near Little Petherick.

== Veneration ==
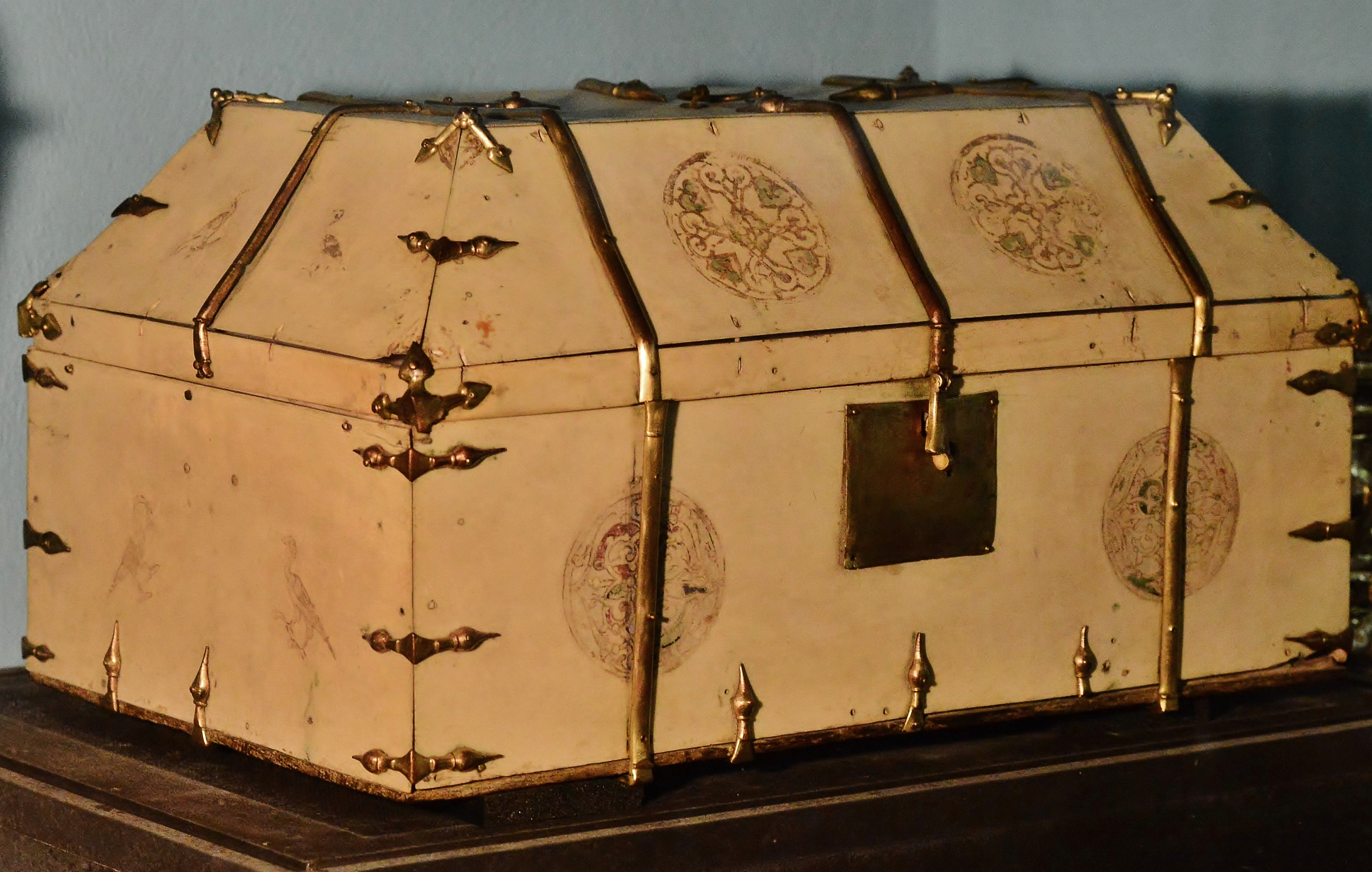
The Bodmin casket which once contained the saint's relics

With Piran and Michael, he is one of the patron saints of Cornwall. He was described by Thomas Fuller as "the captain of Cornish saints".

Humility is a virtue strongly associated with Petroc. One of the pervasive stories about this describes his return from the pilgrimage to Rome and Jerusalem. As he set foot home in Britain under a heavy rain, he confidently told his companions that it would clear up by morning. Instead, the downpour lasted for many days and Petroc, ashamed of his presumptuousness, is said to have left on another pilgrimage, this one of penance. Legendarily he travelled as far as India where he is said to have tamed a wolf. In iconography, he is frequently depicted with this unlikely pet. Also, like several other British saints, Petroc is often shown with a stag.

In 936, King Athelstan of England annexed Cornwall and granted privilege of sanctuary to Padstow, there only being two other churches in Cornwall with this privilege.

His feast day is 4 June. His major shrine was always at St Petroc's Church, Bodmin. In 1177, a Breton stole his relics from Bodmin and gave them to the Abbey of St Meen. However, Henry II restored them and, though the relics were thrown out during the English Reformation, their ivory casket is still on public display at St. Petroc's in Bodmin. His remains were reputed to have ended up in the bay of Hailemouth near Padstow. A list in the Leofric missal and another manuscript list in Exeter Cathedral record that the cathedral possessed relics of the saint. It is likely that they had been presented by King Athelstan.

Petroc is remembered in the Church of England with a commemoration on 4 June.

== Legacy ==
The flag of Devon is dedicated to Saint Petroc

- Saint-Perreux in Brittany is named for him.
- The Flag of Devon is dedicated to Saint Petroc. Designed by Ryan Sealey, it was the winner of a competition organised by the BBC in 2003. It has been used by residents and, since October 2006, by Devon County Council.
- St Petrock's (Exeter) is a charity working with people who are homeless and vulnerably housed in Devon.
- The St. Petroc's Society is a charity working to address homelessness in Cornwall.
- St Petroc's Orthodox Monastery in Tasmania, which used the Sarum Rite, was named after him from 1992 until its closure in 2012.
- The 2008 merger of North Devon College and East Devon College led to them being re-branded under the name Petroc College in 2009.

== See also ==
- Martyrology of Tallaght
- Category:Churches dedicated to St Petroc

== Sources ==
- Doble, G. H. (1938) Saint Petrock, a Cornish Saint; 3rd ed. [Wendron: the author] (includes "Padstow church and parish"; by Charles Henderson)
- Doble, G. H. (1965) The Saints of Cornwall: part 4. Truro: Dean and Chapter; pp. 132–166
- Jankulak, Karen (2000) The Medieval Cult of St. Petroc Boydell Press (19 Oct 2000) ISBN 978-0-85115-777-1
- Orme, Nicholas (1996). English Church Dedications, with a Survey of Cornwall and Devon. Exeter: University of Exeter Press. ISBN 0-85989-516-5.
- Orme, Nicholas (2000) The Saints of Cornwall Oxford: U. P. (6 Jan 2000) ISBN 978-0-19-820765-8
- Stacey, Robin Chapman, review of Karen Jankulak. "The Medieval Cult of St. Petroc" Albion: A Quarterly Journal Concerned with British Studies, Vol. 34, No. 1 (Spring, 2002), pp. 180–181
