= Coombeshead Academy =

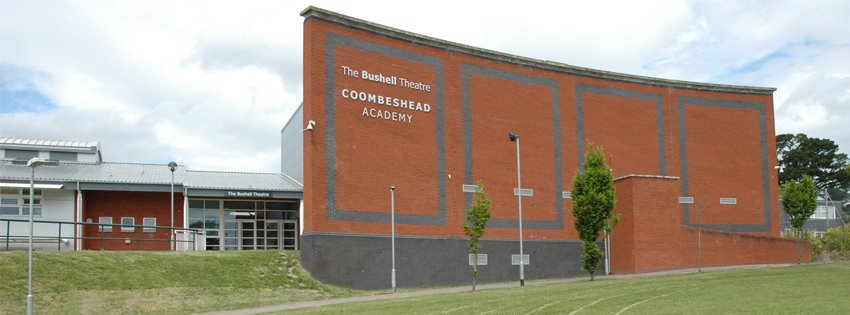

Location
- Coombeshead Road; Newton Abbot, Devon, TQ12 1PT; England
- Coordinates: 50°32′05″N 3°37′13″W

Information
- Type: Academy
- Motto: Inspiring Excellence
- Specialist: Mathematics, Arts
- Department for Education URN: 137176 Tables
- Ofsted: Reports
- Head teacher: Robert Coles
- Gender: Coeducational
- Age: 11 to 18
- Enrolment: 903
- Colours: Grey & Blue
- Website: https://www.coombesheadacademy.org.uk

Coombeshead Academy, formerly Coombeshead College, is an 11–18 Comprehensive School with approximately 900 students.

== Bushell Theatre ==
In the 2011 Spring term Coombeshead Academy opened The Bushell to the community. The theatre is used for the school's expressive arts shows, music concerts, drama productions and some assemblies.

== Education South West ==
Since January 2017, Coombeshead Academy has been a part of Education South West, a large multi-academy trust consisting of 10 successful schools in Devon in order to maintain standards of education.
