= Newton Abbot Community Hospital =

- Torbay and South Devon NHS Foundation Trust
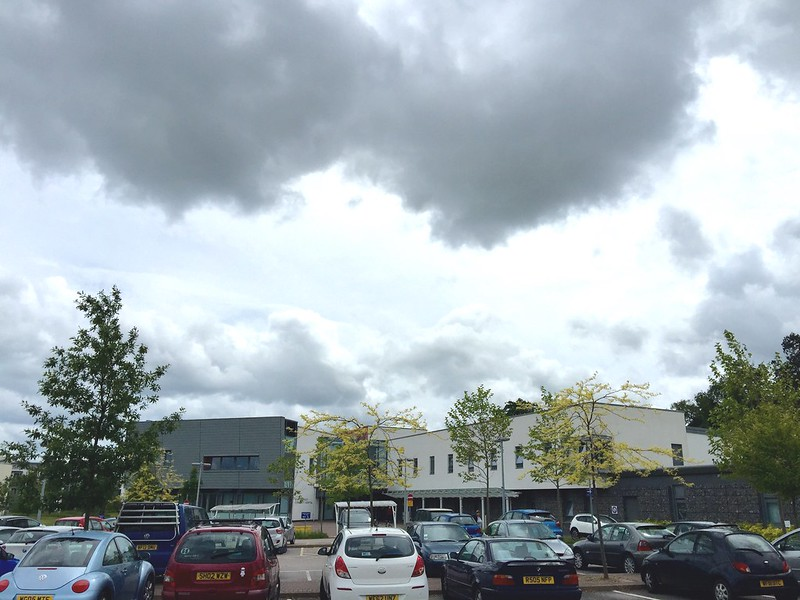
- Newton Abbot Community Hospital

- Shown in Devon

Geography
- Location: Jetty Marsh Road, Newton Abbot, Devon, England
- Coordinates: 50.5392°N 3.6124°W

Organisation
- Care system: NHS
- Type: Community

History
- Founded: 2009

Links
- Website: www.torbayandsouthdevon.nhs.uk/visiting-us/newton-abbot-community-hospital/
- Lists: Hospitals in England

Newton Abbot Community Hospital is a health facility on West Golds Way in Newton Abbot, Devon, England. It is managed by Torbay and South Devon NHS Foundation Trust.

== History ==
The hospital was commissioned to replace the old Newton Abbot Hospital in East Street. The new facility was procured under a private finance initiative contract in 2007 and was designed by Murphy Philipps and built by Rydon at a cost of £20 million. The hospital, which opened in January 2009, was awarded "Best Community Care Design" in the Building Better Healthcare Awards in 2009.
