= Totnes Community Hospital =

- Torbay and South Devon NHS Foundation Trust
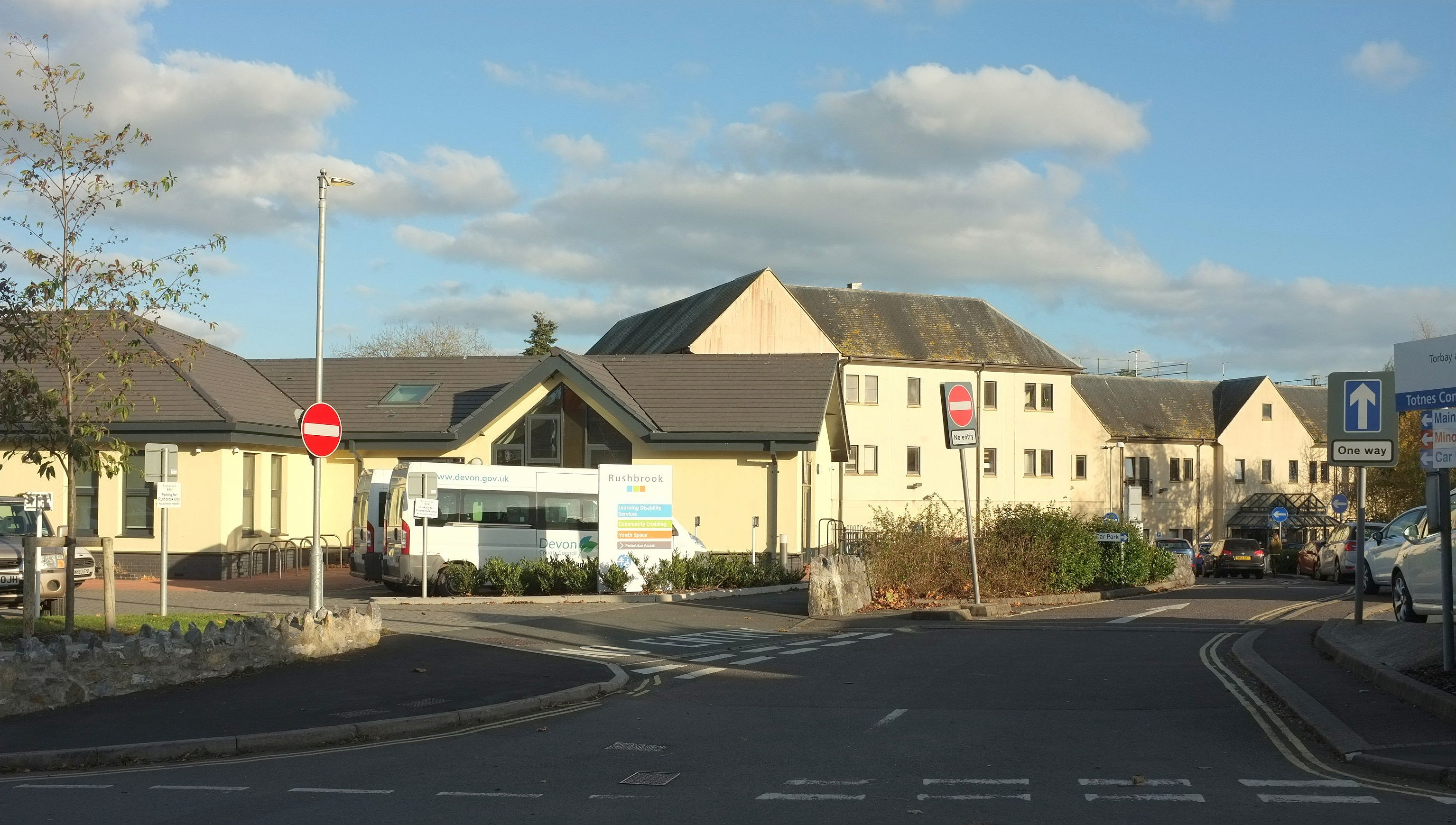
- Totnes Community Hospital

- Shown in Devon

Geography
- Location: Coronation Road, Totnes, Devon, England
- Coordinates: 50.4327°N 3.6840°W

Organisation
- Care system: NHS
- Type: Community

History
- Founded: 19th century

Links
- Website: www.torbayandsouthdevon.nhs.uk/visiting-us/totnes-community-hospital/
- Lists: Hospitals in England

Totnes Community Hospital is a health facility on Coronation Road in Totnes, Devon, England. It is managed by Torbay and South Devon NHS Foundation Trust.

== History ==
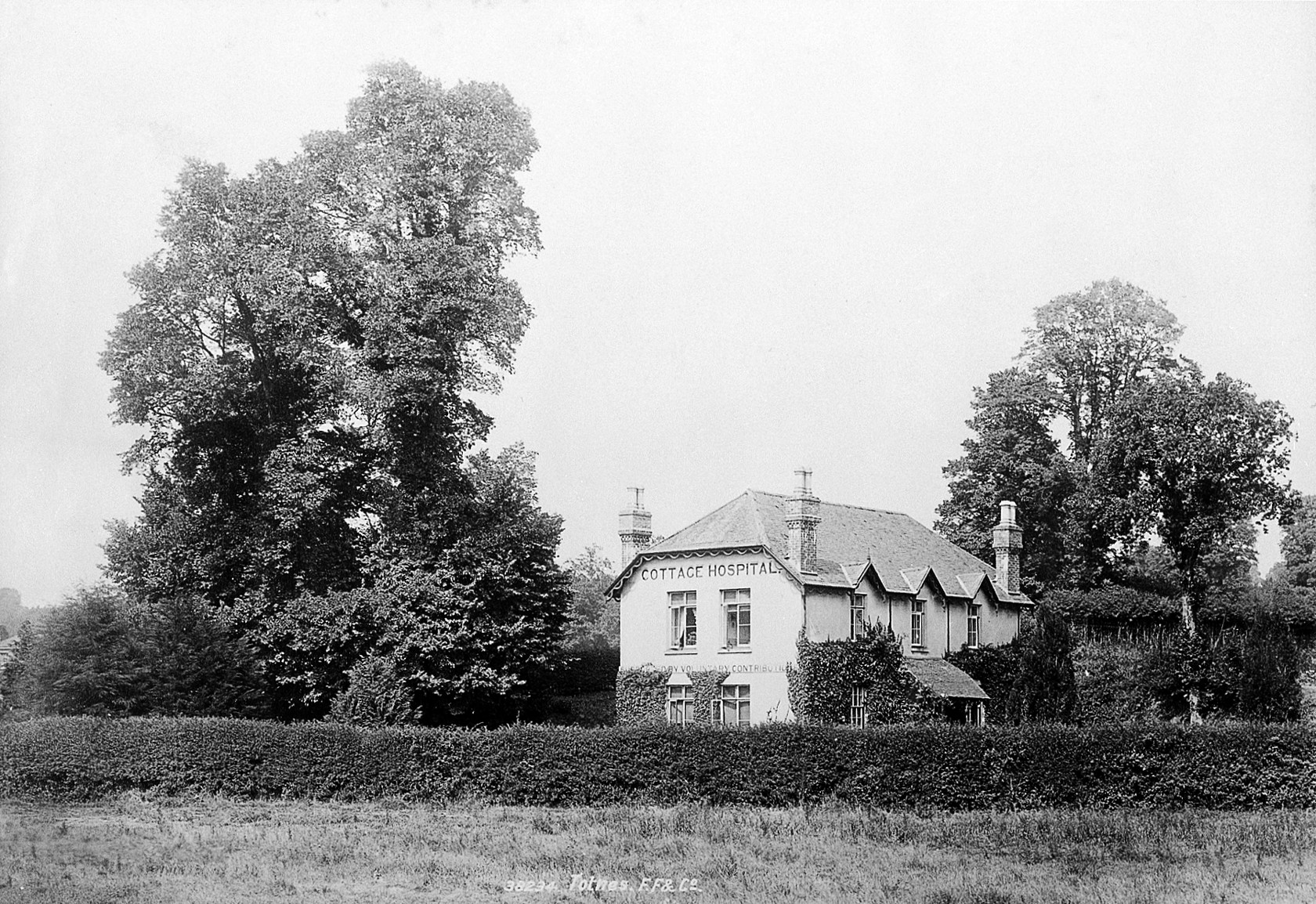
The original hospital on Steamer Quay Road

The facilities has its origins in a cottage hospital established by the conversion of a house on Steamer Quay Road in the 19th century. This was replaced by a new purpose-built cottage hospital built by Thomas Brook on Bridgetown Hill in the 1890s. The Bridgetown Hill facility eventually became decrepit and, after the hospital closed in the early 1990s, the site was developed as Varian Court.

The current facility on Coronation Road, which replaced both the old Bridgetown Hill facility and the Broomborough Hospital, was opened by the Duchess of Kent in 1993. The hospital was briefly closed because of the discovery of the legionella bacteria in January 2019.
