= Keyberry Park =

Coordinates: 50°31′23″N 3°35′51″W

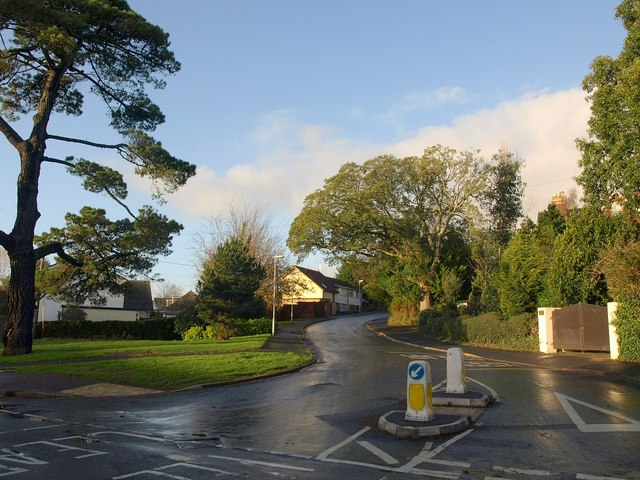
Keyberry Park, Newton Abbot

Keyberry Park was once an independent settlement in Devonshire, now a district of Newton Abbot.

== Etymology ==
Its name is first attested around 1200 as Kauebiri and Cawbiry. The second element of this name is agreed to be the Old English word burh, meaning "fortification". The first element was long thought to be an Old English personal name Cāfa, but in the 2020s it was suggested that the first element was an Old English common noun cawe, meaning "jackdaw" or "corvid". Thus the name once meant either "Cāfa's fortification" or "jackdaw fortification".
