= Torbay and Southern Devon Health and Care NHS Trust =

UK NHS trust

- Former name: Torbay Care Trust
- Type: NHS trust
- Established: 1 April 2012
- Disbanded: 1 October 2015
- Hospitals: Ashburton Hospital; Bovey Tracey Hospital; Brixham Hospital; Dartmouth Hospital; Dawlish Hospital; Kingsbridge Hospital; Newton Abbot Hospital; Paignton Hospital; South Hams Hospital; Tavistock Hospital; Totnes Hospital

Torbay and Southern Devon Health and Care NHS Trust was a NHS trust that provided health and care in and around Torbay, Devon, England.

== History ==
It was established as Torbay Care Trust in October 2005, with responsibility for health and social care services in a partnership agreement with Torbay Borough Council from December 2005.

From then until April 2012, the trust had responsibility for both commissioning and providing integrated health and social care services to people in the Torbay area. As part of the changes associated with the Health and Social Care Act 2012 the commissioning function was detached from the trust. On 1 April 2012, the Trust became Torbay and Southern Devon Health and Care NHS Trust.

== Services ==
The Trust was responsible for community health services in South Devon and Torbay as well as adult social care services in Torbay only.

It was a pioneer within the NHS in England in demonstrating the advantages of integrating health and social care into one organisation. And "one of three areas that have been working to learn from Kaiser Permanente, a leading United States health maintenance organisation."

The Trust ran 11 community hospitals across South Devon.

The trust named Mears Group in December 2014 as the preferred bidder to run its Living Well@Home Services contract to integrate IT systems and deliver a range of community-based services for a minimum of five years.

Occombe House in Paignton was owned by Torbay Council and run by the trust. It provided for eight residents who required a high level of care and round-the-clock support. It was agreed in January 2015, after a dispute lasting seven years, that the existing building should be replaced by two new four bedroom bungalows, which were built and run by Sandwell Community Caring Trust.

It was named by the Health Service Journal as one of the top hundred NHS trusts to work for in 2015. At that time it had 1689 full-time equivalent staff and a sickness absence rate of 4.41%. 73% of staff recommend it as a place for treatment and 65% recommended it as a place to work.

== Merger ==
The trust merged with South Devon Healthcare NHS Foundation Trust who previously ran Torbay Hospital forming a new organisation Torbay and South Devon NHS Foundation Trust in October 2015.

== See also ==
- List of NHS trusts
