= Flag of Devon =

Flag of English county

- Saint Petroc's Flag
- Use: Civil flag
- Proportion: 25:43
- Adopted: October 2006 (by county council)
- Design: A centred white cross with black edging on green background. (Vert, a cross argent)
- Designed by: Ryan Sealey

The Flag of Devon (also known as Saint Petroc's Flag) is the flag of the ceremonial county of Devon, which consists of a white centered cross with black edging over a green field. It is notable for its creation through two web-based polls, and is an important symbol of Devon's regional identity.

It is dedicated to Saint Petroc, a local saint who ministered to the Celtic Britons of Dumnonia in the 5th and 6th centuries. Numerous churches and sites throughout Devon are dedicated to him.

== Origins ==
Before the adoption of Saint Petroc's Flag, Devon had no standardised flag. The impetus for the flag's creation came from an article published by BBC Devon in 2002 titled "Devon's forgotten Celtic culture", which asserted that Devon possessed a Celtic heritage that had been overlooked compared to neighbouring Cornwall and that its "lost culture" should be revived. This sparked discussion on BBC Devon's message board in favour of a flag for Devon, and in response a web poll was set up to decide on a design from those submitted by members of the public.

The initial poll put forward a shortlist of 12 potential designs from those submitted to the BBC, with the flag that would eventually be selected coming first with 21.3% of the vote. However this was a close result, with the second most popular design only 0.3% behind the winner. Because of this, a second poll was held which yielded a more decisive result, with the winning design by student Ryan Sealey taking 49% of the votes cast.

Edward Pellew's flag from the Battle of Algiers (1816)

Although the flag is relatively young, its colours are those traditionally identified with Devon (e.g. the colours of its Rugby Union team, Exeter University and Plymouth Argyle F.C.). In 1816, Lord Exmouth flew a dark green flag with white circles at the Bombardment of Algiers, now on view at the Teign Valley Museum. The green represents the colour of the rolling and lush Devon hills, the black represents the high and windswept moors (Dartmoor and Exmoor) and the white represents both the salt spray of Devon's two coastlines and the China Clay industry (and mining in general).

=== Proposed flags ===
The following flags were also featured as candidates in the poll:

== Usage ==
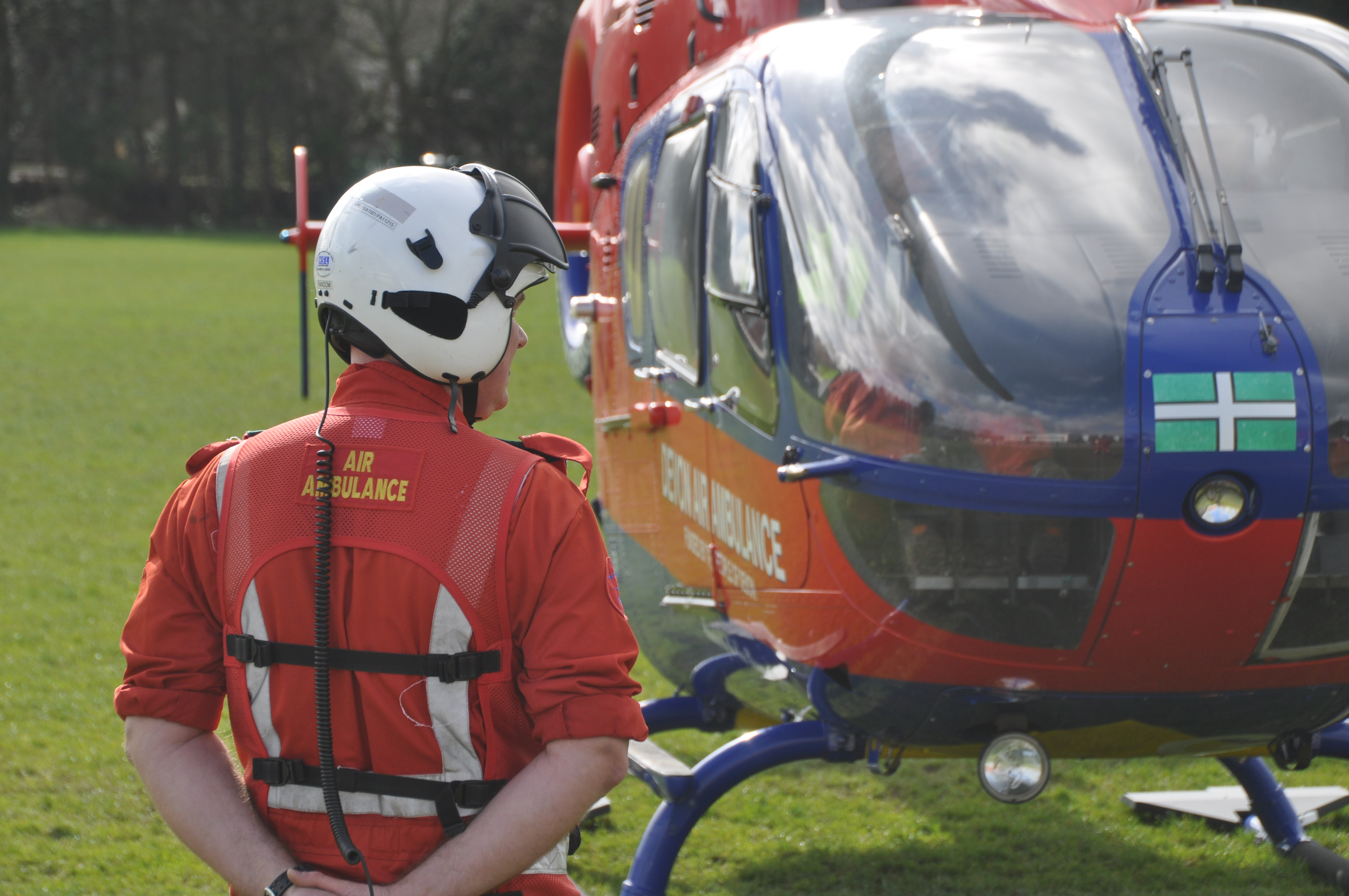
A Devon Air Ambulance helicopter with the flag emblazoned on the front.

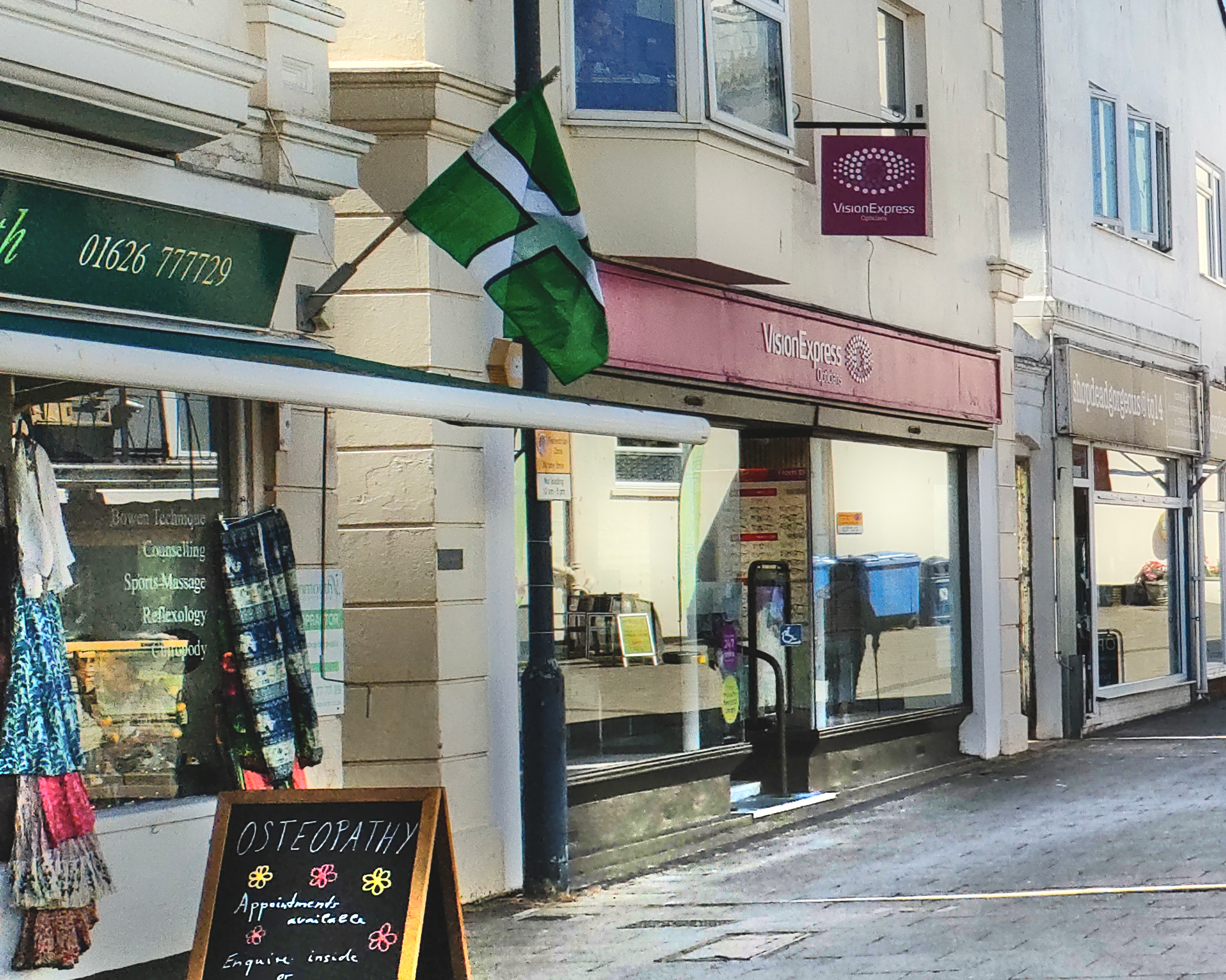
The flag flying outside a row of shops.

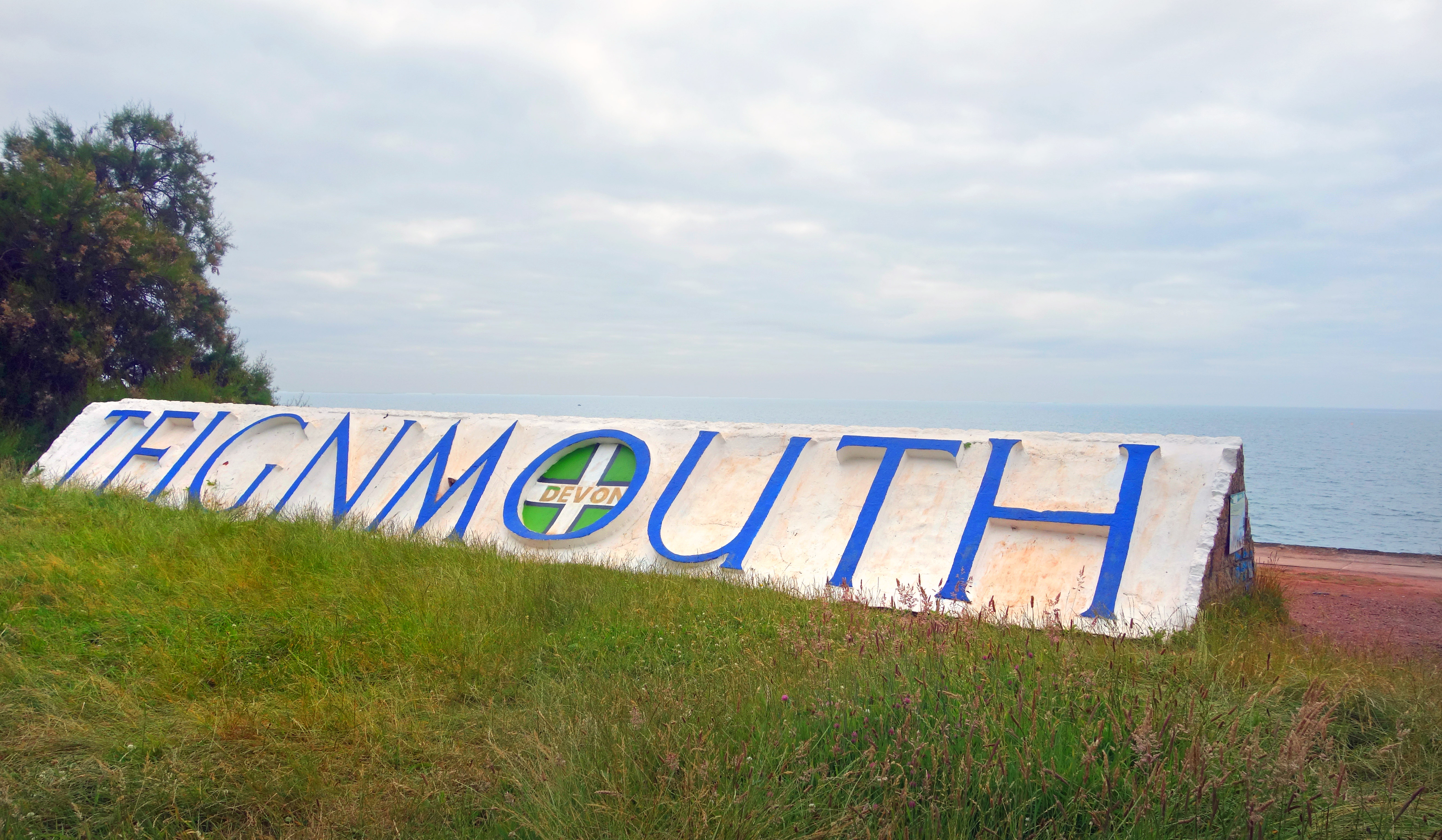
The Teignmouth Letters at Sprey Point bearing the flag.

After its inception, the Devon flag rapidly gained popularity and saw widespread adoption by both private individuals and local organisations. It eventually gained official recognition in October 2006 when Devon County Council raised the flag outside County Hall.

In April 2004, a resident of Ottery St Mary in East Devon was threatened with legal action for flying the Devon flag in his back garden, as planning permission was required to fly non-national flags. Subsequently the then Minister for Housing, Keith Hill, said local authorities can officially "turn a blind eye" to the practice of flying the county flag from poles. Devon County Council announced its intention to defy the government's flag-flying rules, continuing to fly the flag from council buildings. The Department for Communities and Local Government repealed this restriction in 2007, and issued new guidance to allow for the flying of the flag without penalty.

=== Suggested flag flying dates ===
The Devon Flag Group have suggested the following dates as days when it is appropriate for the Devon flag to be flown. Most of them are either the days of local events or the feast days of Devon's saints. It is also flown outside of these days, especially in rural towns.

- 4 January – St Rumon of Tavistock and Romansleigh
- 7 January – St Brannock of Braunton
- 5 March – St Piran, patron saint of tin miners
- 12 March – Paul Aurelian, brother of St Sidwell
- 7 April – St Brannock, as celebrated in Exeter
- 1 May – Saint Walpurga of Devon
- May Bank Holiday – anniversary of first time the flag was flown at World Gig Championship 2003, Isles of Scilly
- May/June – Devon County Show
- 3 June – St Kevin
- 4 June – St Petroc
- 5 June – St Boniface of Crediton, Patron Saint of Devon
- 6 June – St Gudwal, hermit of Devon
- 17 June – St Nectan, patron of Hartland
- 21/22 June – Midsummer's day
- 26 June – St Brannock, another feast day
- 5 July – Exeter Lammas Fair
- 8 July – St Urith of Chittlehampton
- 13 July – St Juthwara
- 30 July – anniversary of battle against Spanish Armada
- 1 August – St Sidwell, Patron Saint of Exeter
- 10 August – St Geraint Last King of Dumnonia
- 30 August – St Rumon
- 26 September – anniversary of Sir Francis Drake's Circumnavigation of the World
- 2 November – St Cumgar
- 5 November – St Kea
- 7 November – St Congar
- 8 December – St Budoc (St Budeaux) of Plymouth
- 12 December – St Corentin
- 16 December – Saint Judicael, King of Domnonée
- 21/22 December – Midwinter
- 31 Dec to 6 Jan – New Year's Eve to Twelfth Night

== Controversy ==
The creation of the flag drew criticism from Cornish nationalists, who accused it online of being an attempt to "hijack" their culture.

Bob Burns, who started the discussion over a flag for Devon, cited the visibility of the Cornish Flag as one of his reasons "Devonians are only too aware of the ubiquitous Cornish Flag, which can often be seen in the form of car bumper stickers, on vehicles entering Devon from Cornwall."

Dr Mark Stoyle, a Devon historian, noted that "People are quite aware in Devon that the Cornish make political capital by claiming to be different". He also suggested that the new-found sense of Devonian identity was a backlash against incoming "city-dwellers settling in the South West".

The decision to dedicate the flag to St Petroc was not without controversy as the saint is equally popular in neighbouring Cornwall. In defending the decision, Devon's strong claim to the saint was highlighted – Devon's 27 church dedications to Saint Petroc outnumber the 6 dedications in Cornwall, and a great many Devon villages are named after the Saint, such as Petrockstowe and Newton St Petroc. Cornwall had already selected Saint Piran as their patron saint many years previously.

== Derived flags ==
The Devon Ensign adds a Union Flag into the Canton of the Devon Flag. This flag is described as for use at regatta, high days and holidays, weddings, and burials at sea.

Flag of Newton Abbot, adopted in 2009, featuring the town's St Leonard's Tower in the centre of a modified Devon flag.

== See also ==
- Devon heraldry
