= Sandwell Community Caring Trust =

Sandwell Community Caring Trust is a registered charity set up in 1997 and based in Sandwell. It provides residential and day care for people with physical and learning disabilities. It supports more than 600 people across a range of properties. It was cited by the Cabinet Office as an example of an organisation where, "since the staff have taken over, back-office costs have halved meaning more money is spent where it matters."

Geoff Walker is the chief executive officer. He was shortlisted for Most People-Focused CEO at the HR Excellence Awards 2011. The organisation took second place in the Sunday Times Top 100 Companies To Work For survey in 2006. In 2008 SCCT won a contract to provide NHS and social services in Torbay. It took over three care homes with 150 staff: Grafton Lodge in Oldbury, Glebefields in Tipton and Greenhaven in Great Bridge in 2011 when they were threatened with closure after Sandwell Metropolitan Borough Council said it could not afford to keep them open.

Unity Trust Bank and Big Issue Invest invested £4.2m into the organisation in 2014 to buy new care home facilities. It planned to build a 62-bed home off Harvest Road in Rowley Regis in 2014. It took over Occombe House in Paignton which is owned by Torbay Council and run by Torbay and Southern Devon Health and Care NHS Trust. It provides for eight residents who require a high level of care and round-the-clock support. It was agreed in January 2015, after a dispute lasting 7 years, that the existing building should be replaced by two new four-bedroom bungalows which will be built and run by Sandwell Community Caring Trust.

In 2021 it cared for 150 people across 66 supported-living settings. The Care Quality Commission put it into special measures after they found it made decisions about people's care without involving them and where it had no legal authority to do so, including administering their medicines covertly and using surveillance equipment in breach of the Mental Capacity Act.
