= Geoffrey Wareham =

British journalist

Geoffrey Wareham (November 22, 1929 – February 11, 2022) was a British journalist.

== Early life ==
Born in Newton Abbot, Devon, Wareham was the son of a Methodist minister and World War I veteran.

== Career ==
Wareham began his journalism career as a teenager at the Western Morning News. Later he worked for London newspapers including the Daily Express and Daily Mail, where he reported events such as Francis Chichester's return from a solo global sailing voyage in 1967.

In 1968, Wareham joined the BBC, where he reported on international conflicts and other major news from regions including the Falklands, Northern Ireland, and the Middle East. He also made occasional appearances as a presenter on the Today programme.

Upon retiring in 1989, Wareham undertook a 4,000-mile cross-America cycling trip. He later settled back in Devon, where he pursued interests in gardening and broadcasting, co-hosting a local radio gardening show.
