= Torbay and South Devon NHS Foundation Trust =

NHS trust

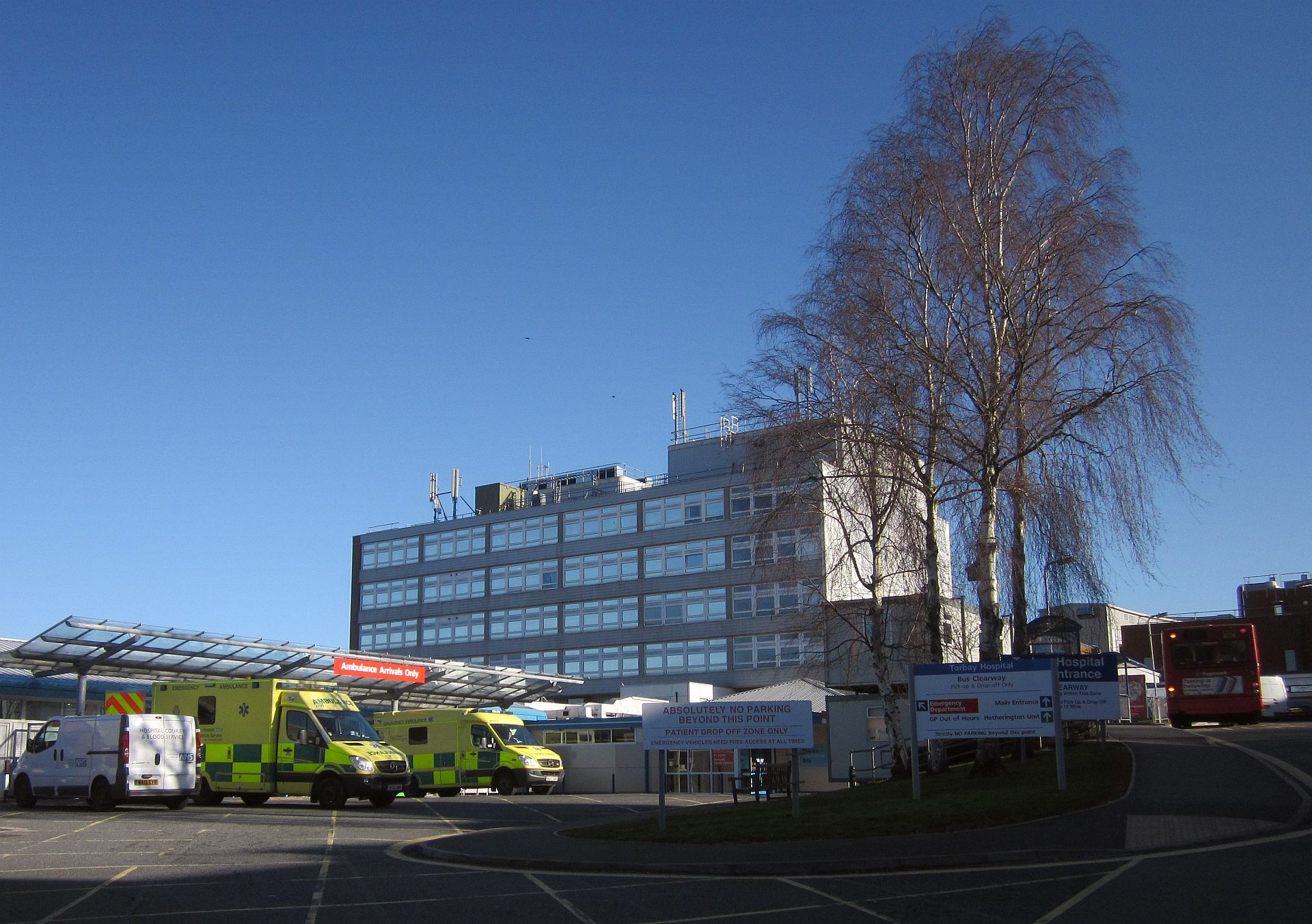
- Torbay Hospital managed by Torbay and South Devon NHS Foundation Trust
- Type: NHS foundation trust
- Established: 1 October 2015
- Headquarters: Newton Road; Torquay; TQ2 7AA
- Hospitals: Newton Abbot Community Hospital; Torbay Hospital; Totnes Community Hospital
- Staff: >6500
- Website: www.torbayandsouthdevon.nhs.uk

Torbay and South Devon NHS Foundation Trust is the main provider of NHS services in Torbay and South Devon. The organisation is seen as pioneering in the English NHS because of the work done with Torbay and Southern Devon Health and Care NHS Trust to integrate health and social care.

== History ==
The organisation became Torbay and South Devon NHS Foundation Trust on 1 October 2015, when South Devon Healthcare NHS Foundation Trust (who ran Torbay Hospital) merged with Torbay and Southern Devon Health and Care NHS Trust (who provided community health and social care services). Both organisations had a history of working closely together but prior to this each organisation had its own history.

Torbay Hospital dates back to 1928, when it was built on the edge of Torbay. South Devon Healthcare NHS Foundation Trust was one of the first NHS Trusts (established in 1991) and was authorised as one of the early NHS Foundation Trusts in 2007.

Prior to the merger, Torbay and Southern Devon Health and Care NHS Trust ran community health services, including community hospitals, in Torbay and South Devon and was one of just five integrated health and social care organisations in the country.

== Staff and services ==
Today, the organisation runs Torbay Hospital (providing acute hospital services) as well as five community hospitals, stretching from Dawlish to Brixham, as well as providing health and social care services to people in their own homes or in their local community.

Services have around 500,000 face-to-face contacts with patients in their homes and communities each year and over 78,000 people are seen in Torbay Hospital's emergency department every year. The resident population that the organisation supports is approximately 286,000 people, plus about 100,000 visitors at any one time during the summer holiday season.

The diverse nature of the organisation see it employ over 6,500 staff in a wide range of settings and locations across communities, who are supported by over 800 volunteers.

== See also ==
- List of NHS trusts
