= Solomon Ezekiel =

English Jewish writer

Solomon Ezekiel (1781–1867) was an English Jewish writer.

== Life ==
Ezekiel was the son of Abraham Ezekiel Ezekiel. He was born at Newton Abbot, Devonshire, on 7 June 1812, and settled at Penzance as a plumber. In January 1820 he published a letter to Sir Rose Price, bart., chairman of a branch of the Society for Promoting Christianity among the Jews, who had asked for a conference with the large and wealthy Hebrew community at Penzance. In consequence of Ezekiel's letter Sir Rose Price made further researches, and came to the conclusion that the Jews were not yet prepared to adopt the Christian faith.

Ezekiel, who was a rigid follower of the rites and ceremonies of the Jewish religion, died at Penzance on 9 March 1867.

== Works ==
He wrote : 1. A translation from the Hebrew of a pamphlet by the Rev. Hart Symons, containing censures of the authorised version of the holy scriptures. A reply to this, by John Rogers, canon of Exeter, was published in 1822. 2. 'The Life of Abraham' and 'The Life of Isaac,' Penzance, 1844–5, 12mo, being a series of lectures on the lives of the patriarchs, delivered before the Penzance Hebrew Society for Promoting the Diffusion of Religious Knowledge. 3, 'Lecture on the Hebrew Festivals,' Penzance, 1847, 12mo, delivered at the Penzance Literary Institute.
