= East Devon College =

UK academic institution

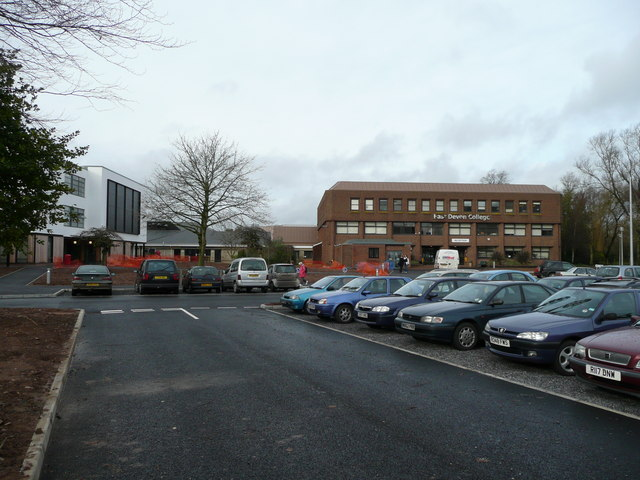
- East Devon College
- Type: Public
- Active: 1981–2008
- Location: Tiverton, United Kingdom; 51.072°N 4.069°W and 50.912°N 3.492°W
- Campus: Tiverton
- Website: www.edc.ac.uk

East Devon College (sometimes shortened to EDC) was a further education college situated in Tiverton, Devon, England. The college operated on four sites; the main campus and various annexes being located in Tiverton, with three additional sites being located in Honiton, Exmouth and Tiverton. In 2005, the college enrolled 3,144 learners, of which 877 were full-time. Around 80% of those learners were aged between sixteen and eighteen years of age. The college's motto was "Maximising your potential", and its aim was "to develop skills, knowledge and confidence for all".

In 2006, the college secured £6 million worth of funding, which they used to construct two new buildings, a plan which took two years to complete. The two new buildings were to be used for a range of subjects including construction, art and design, media studies and photography, they were officially opened on 6 March 2008 by Sir Ian Heathcoat-Amory, a local dignitary and business leader.

The findings of an Ofsted inspection in 2007 suggested that the college was making "insufficient progress", in such areas as achievements and standards, quality of provision, and leadership and management.

In July 2007, it was announced that EDC was seeking a merger partner. Of the ten learning institutions that showed interest, five were shortlisted to give a presentation to the board of governors who, after a rigorous selection process, selected Barnstaple-based establishment North Devon College as the merger partner. On 1 August 2008 this merger was completed and the new college was rebranded as Petroc.

From September 2009 to January 2026 the former East Devon College became officially known as Petroc's Tiverton Campus, but after Petroc’s merger with Exeter College the site became a satellite campus bearing Exeter’s Branding
