= St Leonard's Tower, Newton Abbot =

St Leonard's Tower
- The Clock Tower
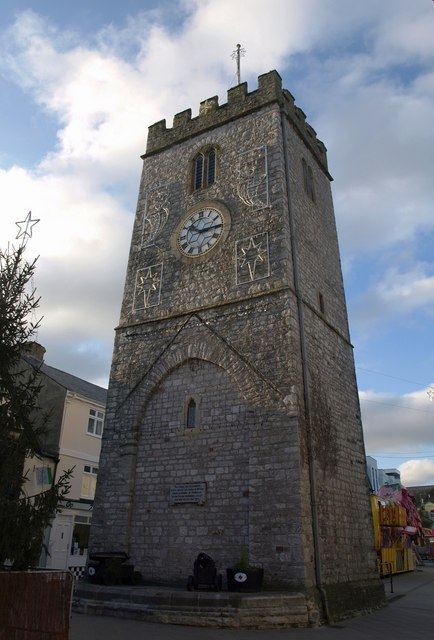
- East face in 2009
- Location: Wolborough Street, Newton Abbot
- Coordinates: 50.5294°N 3.6126°W
- Built: 15th-century
- Original use: Church tower
- Architectural style(s): Gothic
- Owner: Newton Abbot Town Council

Listed Building – Grade II*
- Official name: St Leonards Tower
- Designated: 16 July 1949
- Reference no.: 1256725

St Leonard's Tower, Newton Abbot, popularly known as The Clock Tower, is a Grade II* listed building in Newton Abbot. It was constructed in the 15th-century as part of a Gothic-style church and was the site of William III's first proclamation in England (although he had not yet become king). The adjoining nave was demolished in 1836 to improve traffic flows but the tower was saved by a local petition. The structure is owned by the town council and opened to the public on selected days.

== Description ==
St Leonard's Tower is approximately 60 feet (18 m) in height and built of Plymouth stone. It is formed of two stages (or storeys), demarked by moulded stone string courses on the outside faces. The lower stage has a door on the west face set within a granite arch, the door is wooden and dates to the 20th century. Above the door is a large twin arched window. On the east face of the lower stage the roof line of the former nave can be discerned in the stonework; below this is a small trefoil-topped window. The upper stage has two arched windows in the centre of each face with a clock face below on the west and east faces. The parapet at the top of the structure is battlemented.

== History ==
The tower is the remaining part of a 15th-century Gothic church structure. A church had sat on this site, in the centre of Newton Abbot and the meeting point of its three main streets, since 1220 and is mentioned in a surviving document of 29 May 1350. The church consisted of the tower and a small nave to the east measuring 55 feet (17 m) by 20 feet (6.1 m). The nave was described as unremarkable aside from some oak seats to the east of the font which were particularly historic.

In 1688, William III of Orange during the Glorious Revolution made his first proclamation in England from the market cross to the immediate east of the church. The site is marked today by an engraved stone. By 1830 the tower had received its clock and housed six bells. The structure's use as a church had largely been supplanted by the newer church at nearby Wolborough but it was used for marriage and baptism ceremonies.

The church was set to be demolished in 1836 to allow widening of Wolborough Street to alleviate traffic congestion. However a popular petition saved the tower, which became an island within the road. The structure received protection as a grade II* listed building on 16 July 1949.

In the late 1960s the Central Electricity Generating Board proposed installing a substation within the tower and a local group raised funds to purchase the tower to prevent this. A plaque on the west face of the structure records that "this tower was refurbished in 1972–1973 by the people of Newton Abbot in memory of Councillor Arthur Claude Shobbrook, JP CA who died on July 17 July 1970".

Today the tower is owned by the Newton Abbot Town Council and looked after by the Newton Abbot Museum who open it to the public for free on selected days between May and September. The tower, popularly known locally as "The Clock Tower", has been described as the most conspicuous building on Wolborough Street and the town's best known landmark. The tower also appears on the flag of Newton Abbot, adopted in 2009.

== Gallery ==
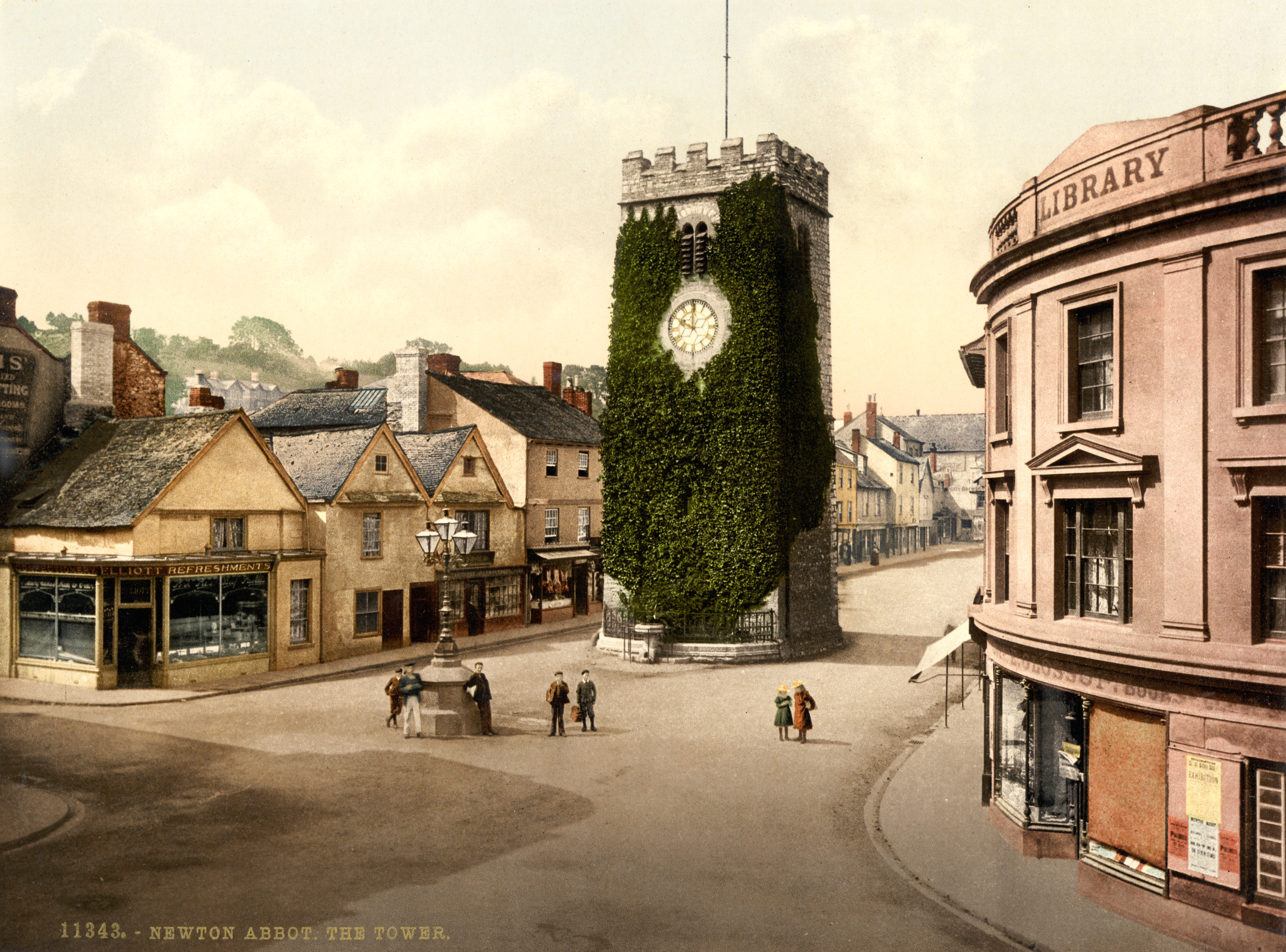
Shown on an 1895 postcard

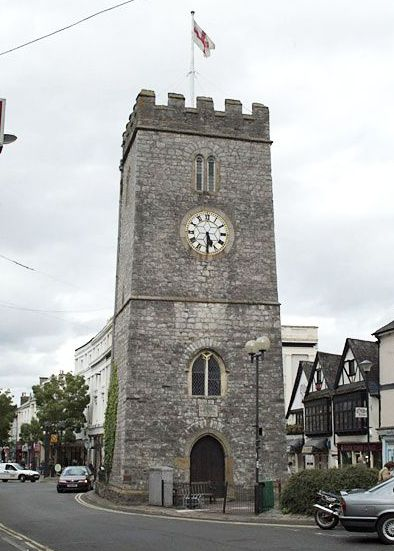
West face in 2005 (before pedestrianisation)

Flag of Newton Abbot since 2009, featuring the tower
