= Torbay Hospital =

NHS hospital

- Torbay and South Devon NHS Foundation Trust
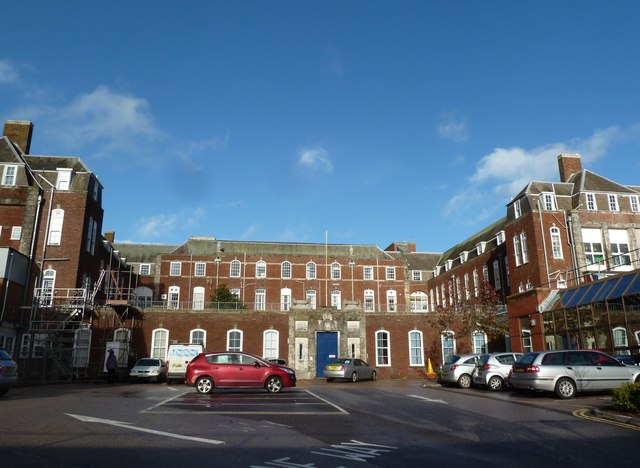
- One of the many linked buildings making up Torbay Hospital in 2013

- Shown in Devon

Geography
- Location: Torquay, Devon, England, United Kingdom
- Coordinates: 50.482°N 3.554°W

Organisation
- Care system: Public NHS

Services
- Emergency department: Yes Accident & Emergency

Helipads
- Helipad: Yes

History
- Founded: 1844

Links
- Website: www.torbayandsouthdevon.nhs.uk/visiting-us/torbay-hospital/
- Lists: Hospitals in England

Torbay Hospital in Torquay is the main hospital of South Devon, England. It is managed by the Torbay and South Devon NHS Foundation Trust.

== History ==
The hospital was founded as the Torbay Hospital, Provident Dispensary and Eye Infirmary in 1844. Construction started in 1850, with the first wing being completed in 1851 and a second wing being added in 1878. A children's ward, the Louisa Cary Ward, opened in 1909.

After the hospital management decided to build a new hospital, a property known as Hengrave House was purchased from Major K.P. Kitson and a design was developed by Percy Adams. Much of the finance was donated by Ella and Violet Wills, daughters of Sir Edward Payson Wills, 1st Baronet. The new facility was officially opened in 1928 by Lord Mildmay. Ceramic picture tiles, manufactured by W.B. Simpson and Sons, and depicting nursery rhymes and rural activities were installed in the children's ward. A chapel, which had been designed by Charles Holden, was added in 1930. The hospital joined the National Health Service in 1948.

== Services ==
The hospital contains an accident & emergency department, which is open 24 hours a day, 365 days a year and has a grass helipad.

The hospital has 650 parking spaces for visitors and 1,100 for staff, who pay at rates linked to their earnings.

== See also ==
- List of hospitals in England
