= North Devon College =

Coordinates: 51.072°N 4.069°W

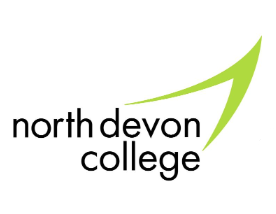

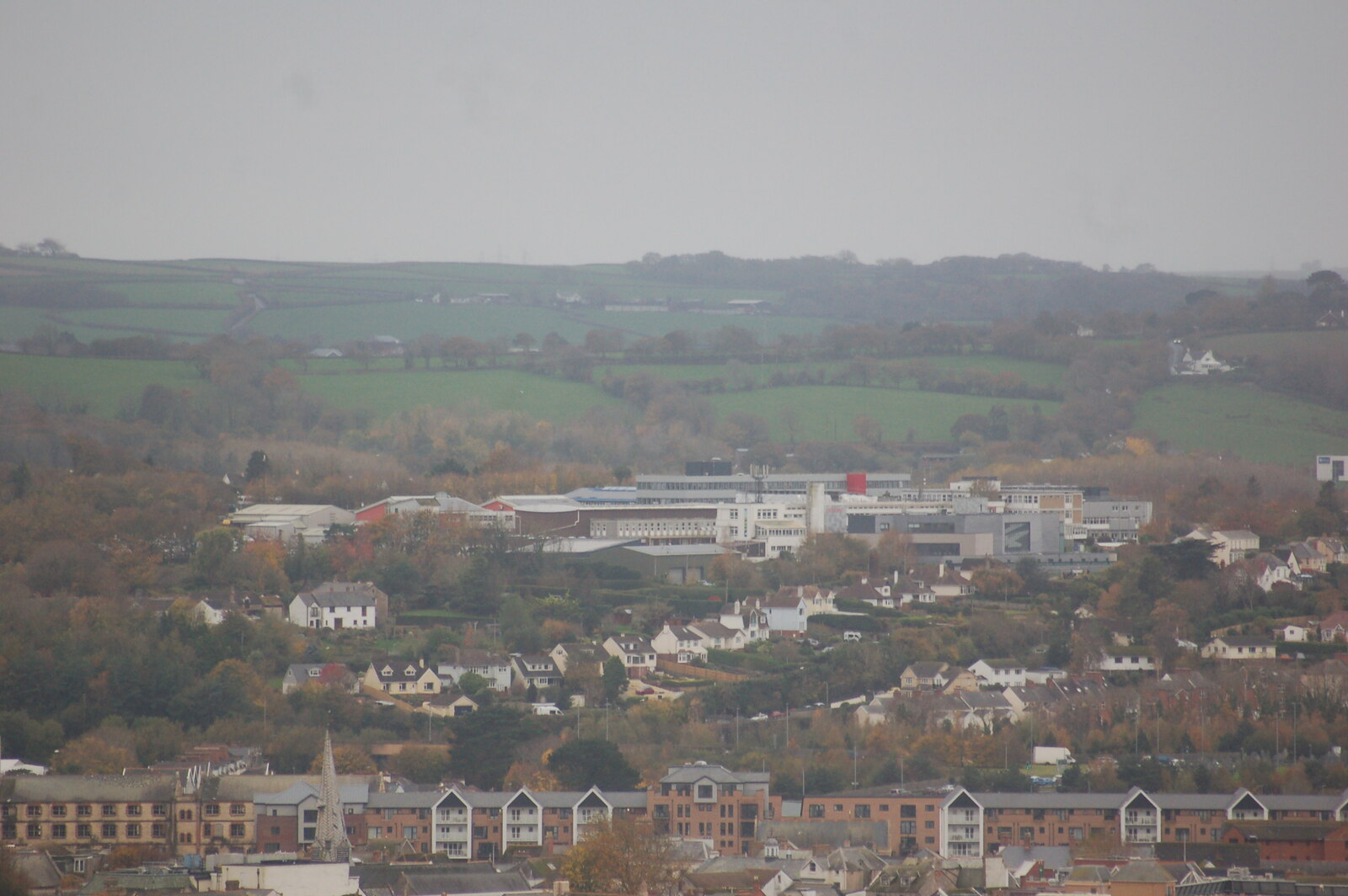

Information
- Former name: Petroc
- Established: 1952 (5th January 2026)
- Principal: John Laramy CBE

North Devon College (NDC) is a further education college in Barnstaple, North Devon, England. Between 2009 and 2026 it was part of Petroc.

== History ==
North Devon College first opened in 1952.

Originally, the plan was to spend £300,000 on the new North Devon Technical College, built on top of Sticklepath Hill. However, the college was developed in stages, starting with the engineering blocks of which only one survives to the present day (now C block) as a large amount of the original 1952 buildings where demolished to make way for the lifestyle centre in 2014

In 1952, the college offered courses including carpentry, bricklaying, auto engineering, science and technical drawing.

Over the years, the college expanded and added more buildings. The campus reflects changes in architectural styles over the late 20th and early 21st centuries.

In 1969, NDC became one of the country's first tertiary colleges, providing a sixth form for North Devon’s newly formed comprehensive schools.

As well as catering for the area's teenagers, the college's curriculum also encompassed adult learning, work-based training and higher education. The college held graduation celebrations in Barnstaple.

As NDC expanded, the college outgrew its main campus and leased additional premises in and around Barnstaple, including the Hair Academy at Roundswell and Queens House in the town centre. Further growth came through the addition of Bude and Holsworthy Training Services (BHTS), adding offices in the North Cornwall town and a stake in the Holsworthy Skills Centre.

Between 2006 and 2009, the college developed plans for a new, £125 million campus on the banks of the River Taw, at Seven Brethren in Barnstaple. The Learning and Skills Council committed £78 million to the project as part of the £2.3 billion Building Colleges for the Future programme. However, the LSC's over-enthusiastic commitment of funds meant the programme overspent. As a result, plans to move the college to a new home were shelved indefinitely.

Despite this setback, NDC continued to develop facilities, including the creation of a new campus in the former Brannam Pottery buildings in Roundswell, Barnstaple.

NDC was frequently one of the top performing colleges in the country and was recognised as 'outstanding' by the Office for Standards in Education (Ofsted) at its last inspection in 2006.

== Merger with East Devon College ==
On 1 August 2008 it was announced that North Devon College and East Devon College would merge. David Dodd, principal of North Devon College, was announced as principal of the new merged college. North Devon College was the nominal survivor of the merger, but that name was deemed unsuitable for the merged college due to its expanded catchment area. On 23 September 2009 North Devon College was rebranded as Petroc.

== Return to North Devon College name ==
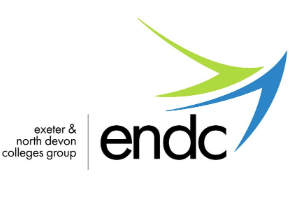

On the 5th January 2026 Petroc reverted to being North Devon College as a result of the former's merger with Exeter College to form Exeter & North Devon Colleges Group. This returns the college to its pre-2009 name.

== Fresh FM ==
Fresh FM is North Devon College's campus radio station. It was the first ever college station to have a long term restricted service licence. It is broadcast on 87.7 FM by college students across the college campus.

== Notable alumni ==
- Stuart Brennan, BAFTA-winning actor
- Katie Hopkins, media personality (The Apprentice)
- Rupert Taylor, political sociologist
