= Highweek =

Village in Devon, England

Coordinates: 50.537°N 3.629°W

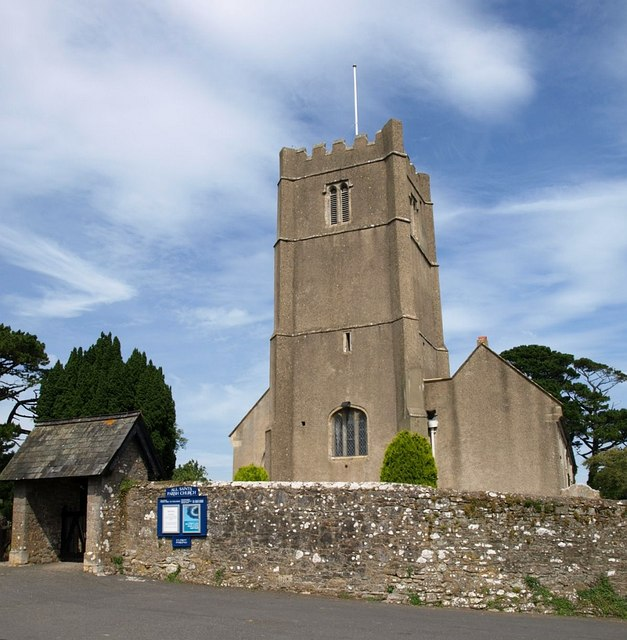
- All Saints Church, Highweek

- Location within Devon
- OS grid reference: SX846720
- Civil parish: Newton Abbot
- District: Teignbridge
- Shire county: Devon
- Region: South West
- Country: England
- Sovereign state: United Kingdom
- Post town: NEWTON ABBOT
- Postcode district: TQ12
- Dialling code: 01626
- Police: Devon and Cornwall
- Fire: Devon and Somerset
- Ambulance: South Western
- UK Parliament: Newton Abbot

Highweek (anciently called Teignwick (alias Teyngewike, Tingwike, Teyngewyk, etc.)), less commonly called Highweek Village is an ecclesiastical parish, former manor and village, now a suburb of Newton Abbot, but still retaining its village identity, in the civil parish of Newton Abbot, in the Teignbridge district, in the county of Devon, England. It is prominent and recognisable due to its high location on a ridge on the north western edge of the town. The area is the centre of the modern electoral ward of Bradley. That ward's population at the 2011 census was 5,043.

Following the Norman Conquest of 1066 the Normans built a motte-and-bailey castle here, of which only a dyke remains (giving it the local name of "Castle Dyke"), which probably remained occupied until the mid 13th century, when the chief residence of the locality became Bradley House. The mediaeval parish church, dedicated to All Saints, now a Grade I listed building, was consecrated in 1428. Until 1864 it served as a chapel of ease to the parish church of adjoining Kingsteignton having been built after the villagers petitioned the pope for their own graveyard.

== Geography ==
Highweek is on a ridge that overlooks the South Devon market town of Newton Abbot, the Teign Estuary and the Bovey Basin. To the north west, Haytor and surrounding parts of Dartmoor dominate the skyline, and to the north east the Haldon Hills some 9 miles (14 km) away towards Exeter can be seen. Immediately north of the village there is the unusual cone shaped hill of Daracombe Beacon that overlooks the ball clay opencast pit of Ringslade Quarry, Howton Road and the 1st Highweek Village Scout Group building. The Beacon has a cluster of trees on its peak and is one of the highest points in Newton Abbot at 82 m. Another high point immediately north of the road of Gaze Hill contains a hidden covered municipal water tank.

The village gives its name to a geological unit (the Highweek Unit) that extends for at least 8 km westwards from the village. The geology underlying Highweek itself is Gurrington slate of Famennian age (a late subdivision of the Devonian period), with small outliers of resistant spilites forming both the ridge on which the church stands and the hills north of the village, such as the aforementioned Daracombe Beacon.

== All Saints Church ==
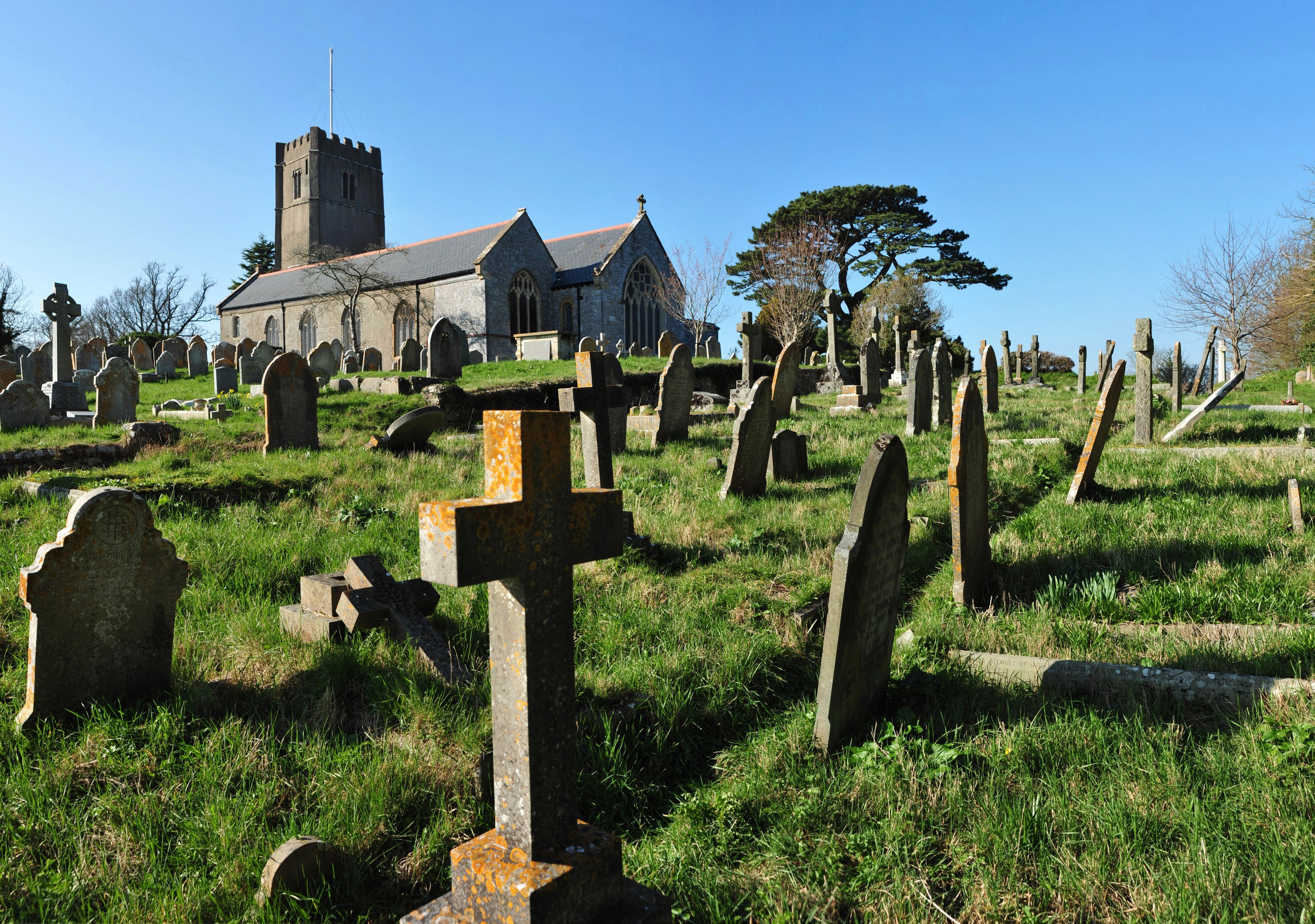
The church and its graveyard

By 1427 the parishioners had built a chapel at Highweek, but they had to carry their dead about three miles (5 km) to the parish church in Kingsteignton. They petitioned Pope Martin V for their own graveyard because "the tides and rivers, and the mud of winter and the intense heat of summer" made the journey "both troublesome and dangerous to accomplish". The pope granted permission in a bull dated 14 May 1427, and the church and its churchyard were consecrated by Edmund Lacy, Bishop of Exeter on 19 April 1428. Until 1864 it remained a chapel of ease to Kingsteignton. All Saints has the Bradley aisle which was built by Richard Yarde of Bradley Manor in the 15th century, and it also had a rood screen that was said to be "beautiful" until it was mutilated in 1786 and later removed completely.

Today, the church is a Church of England place of worship in the Diocese of Exeter, known as Highweek Parish. All Saints shares parishioners in rotating services with the other church in the parish, St Mary the Virgin, Abbotsbury, Church. It is a Grade I listed building.

== History ==
=== Saxon ===
Highweek stands in an area which experienced invasion and settlement in about 700 AD by the Saxons and then by the Danes in 1001 AD, when they sacked and pillaged the nearby village of Kingsteignton. The Anglo-Saxon suffix -wic means "a settlement", with the original Saxon place name Teignwic thus signifying "settlement by the River Teign.

=== Norman ===
The manor, anciently called Teignwic (alias Teignwick, Teyngewike, Teyngewyk, etc.) is not listed in the Domesday Book of 1086, as it was then a part of the large royal manor of Teintone (now Kingsteignton). In the village is a Norman motte-and-bailey earthwork now known as Castle Dyke, a scheduled monument included in the "At Risk" register, but still standing tall today "...crowned by a single surviving pine."

=== 12th century ===
The manor of Teignwick was given by King Henry II (1154–1189) to "John, the son of Lucas his butler". Following the Norman revolt it was forfeited to the crown and was re-granted by King John (1199–1216) to Eustace de Courtenay, apparently a relative of Renaud de Courtenay (d.1194), ancestor of the Earls of Devon.

=== 13th 14th centuries ===
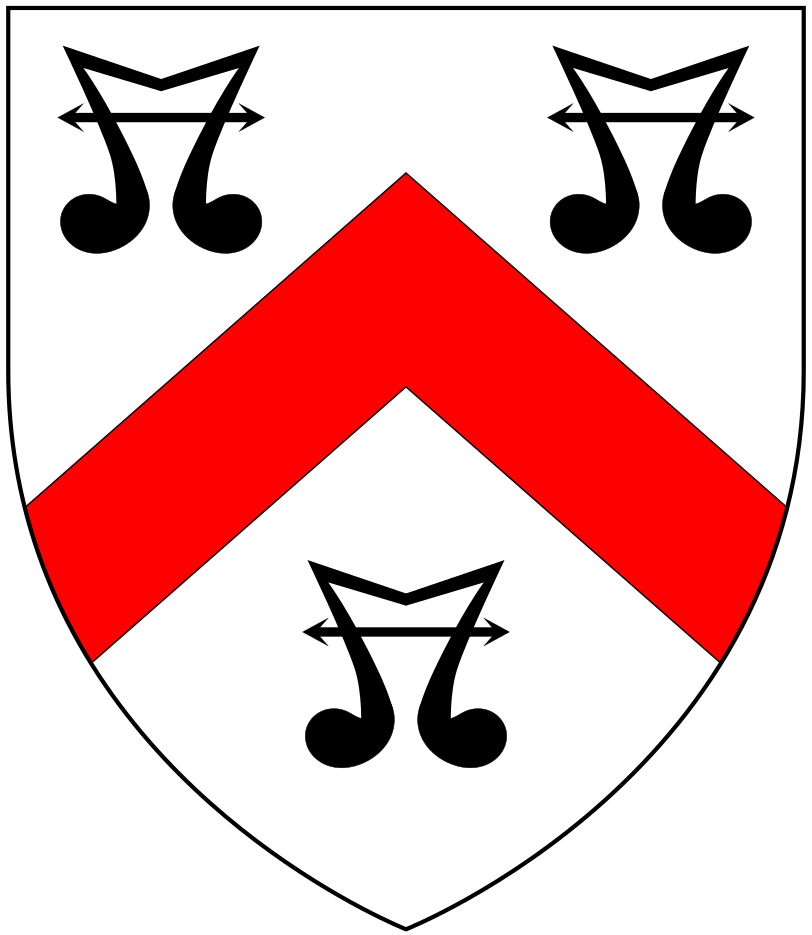
Canting arms of Bushel: Argent, a chevron gules between three water bougets sable

The earliest surviving documentary reference to the manor is as Teyngewike in about 1200. The part of the Hundred of Teignbridge, including Teignwick, which lay to the west of the River Teign were owned by the king, and in 1246 King Henry III granted these lands, including Dipford, to Sir Theobald de Englishville (d.1262). He appears not to have married and as he had no children, shortly before his death in 1262 and with royal licence dated 1261, he conveyed his lands to his "kinsman or foster child" Robert Bushel (d.1269), whom he had brought up. His heir was his 4 year-old son Theobald Bushel, who became a ward of Henry de Bickleigh and his wife Matilda. It is likely that they abandoned Castle Dyke in favour of a new manor house they built in the nearby valley of the River Lemon. The manor of Teignwick/Highwick was held by the Bushel family for nine generations until the death of John Bushel, the last in the male line, during the reign of King Richard II (1377–1399). During the 13th century the settlement north of the River Lemon became known as Newton Bushel after the Bushel family. By 1301 it was being called Heghwyk, the reference to the prominent (high) hill on which it stands having taken over though the name Teignweek was still in use as late as 1850.

The estate of Ringslade in Highweek was first mentioned in the 13th century as Ryngeslad in 1238. The estate belonged the Segar family from at least the 16th century until the 20th century. Ringslade House was constructed in the 16th century and is today a Grade II listed building.

=== 15th century ===
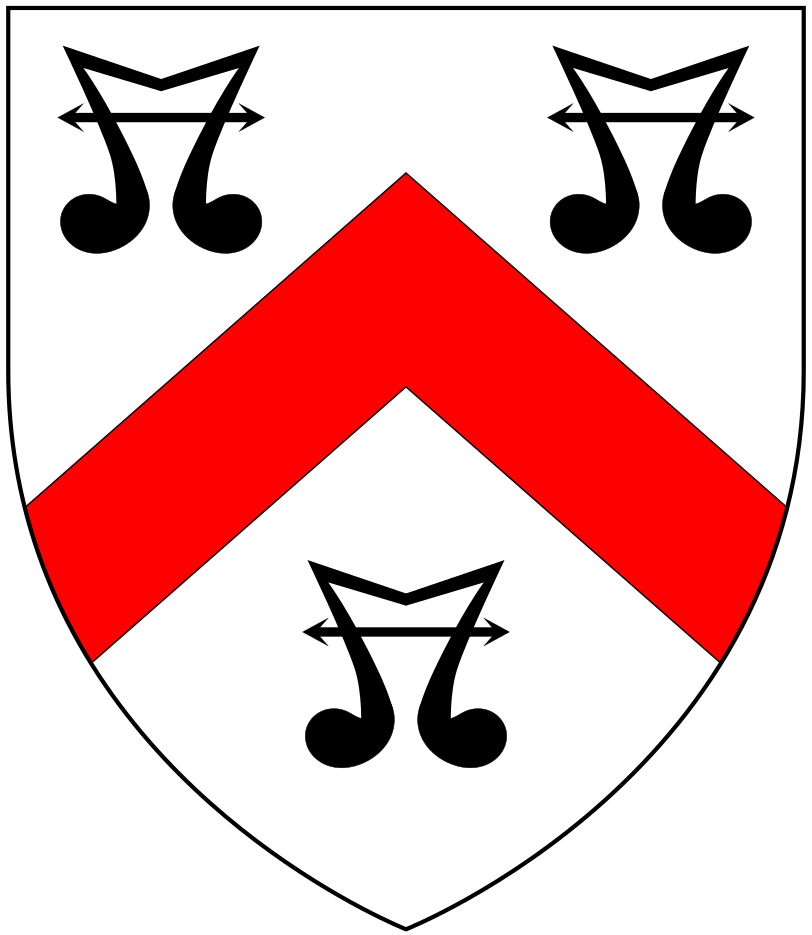
Arms of Yarde: Argent, a chevron gules between three water bougets sable, arms inherited from the Bushel family

In 1402 the AtYard (later Yarde) family acquired the manor of Highweek. The first holder was Thomas Yarde, son of Roger AtYard by his wife Elizanta (alias Elisote) Bushel, heiress of Highweek. She was the aunt and heiress of John Bushel, the last in the male line. His son and heir was Richard Yarde, Sheriff of Devon in 1442/3, who married Joan Ferrers, the heiress of Churston Ferrers, where a junior branch of the Yarde family was later seated. This Richard Yarde built most of the surviving manor house at Bradley, though a few remnants of the late 13th century Bushel building still survive.

=== Later history ===
Newton Bushel combined with New Town of the Abbots (of Torre Abbey) from the south side of the River Lemon to form what became known as Newton Abbot. When elected parish and district councils were established in 1894, Highweek was initially given a parish council and included in the Newton Abbot Rural District. The parish council lasted for less than seven years; in 1901 Highweek was transferred into the urban district of Newton Abbot. After 1901 Highweek was therefore classed as an urban parish and so no longer had a parish council, instead being directly administered by Newton Abbot Urban District Council. The civil parish of Highweek was eventually abolished on 1 April 1974 when the three parishes within Newton Abbot Urban District (Highweek, Wolborough and Milber) were united as a single parish called Newton Abbot within the new Teignbridge district. In 1951 the parish had a population of 5626.

== Modern Highweek ==
Today Highweek has a public house called the Highweek Village Inn, a garage, village hall, and a late medieval church. Within the parish boundary there are two secondary schools with sixth forms, Coombeshead Academy and Newton Abbot College, and another church: St Mary the Virgin, Abbotsbury. At the meeting point of the road of Highweek Village and Coombeshead Road there are rustic cottages and terraced houses. There was a village post office into the 1990s, opposite the Highweek Inn at the top of Pitt Hill Road, but it is now residential.

== Notable residents ==
- Segar family, a Devonshire gentry family listed in the Heraldic Visitations of Devon, 1620 and who lived at Ringslade in Highweek.
- Cricketer and rugby player Dr Henry Banbury Mapleton MA, MD) grew up in Highweek. In 1894, he became medical officer for Newton Abbot which also included Highweek
- Bruce Montgomery, film composer and mystery writer (as Edmund Crispin), lived here from 1964 until his death in 1978.
