= Sayala =

Sayala may refer to:

- Sayala, Rajasthan, village in Rajasthan, India
- Sayala, Parbhani, village in Parbhani taluka of Parbhani district, Mahashtra, India
- Sayala, Palam, village in Palam taluka of Parbhani district, Mahashtra, India
- Sayala Mace, a ceremonial mace from Predynastic Egypt.
- Sayala (Egypt), archaeological site in Nubia, where Sayala Mace was found
