= Stover Canal =

Derelict canal in Devon, England

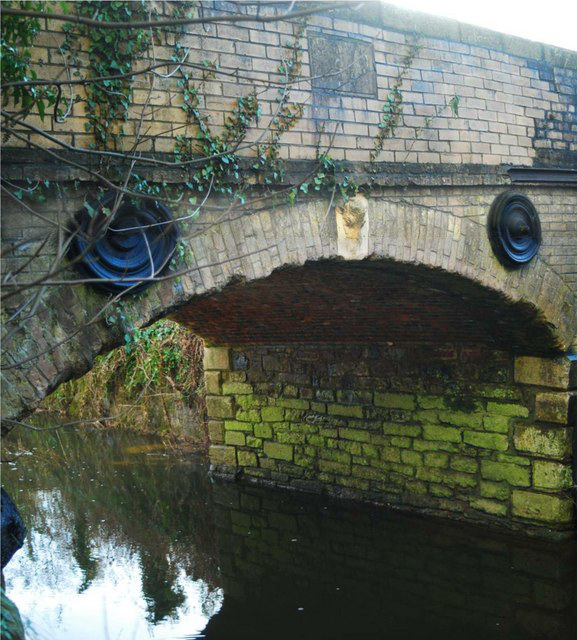
- The north side of the bridge at Teignbridge

Specifications
- Maximum boat length: 56 ft 0 in (17.07 m)
- Locks: 5
- Status: Restoration pending

History
- Original owner: James Templer
- Principal engineer: Thomas Gray
- Date of first use: 1792
- Date closed: 1937

Geography
- Start point: Jetty Marsh, Newton Abbot
- End point: Ventiford
- Connects to: River Teign

The Stover Canal is a canal located in Devon, England. It was opened in 1792 and served the ball clay industry until it closed in the early 1940s. Today it is derelict, but the Stover Canal Society is aiming to restore it and reopen it to navigation.

== History ==
The canal was built at a time when the ball clay industry was expanding, but transport of the bulky product was difficult. James Templer (1748–1813) of Stover House, Teigngrace, saw this as an opportunity, and began to construct the canal at his own expense in January 1790. He planned to reach Bovey Tracey, passing through Jewsbridge, near Heathfield en route, and to construct a branch to Chudleigh. Having invested over £1,000 in the project, he sought an act of Parliament which would allow him to raise more capital, but although the Templer's Estate Act 1792 (32 Geo. 3. c. 41 Pr.) was passed on 11 June 1792, he did not invoke its powers, as the canal had already reached Ventiford, Teigngrace and he did not extend it further.

As built, the canal was 1.7 miles (2.7 km) long and included five locks. It was supplied with water from three feeders, one from Ventiford Brook, a stream which also supplies Stover Lake (now in Stover Country Park) and one from the River Bovey at Jewsbridge, both of which fed the top pound, and one from the River Teign at Fishwick, which entered the canal just below lock 4. The exit from the canal was on to the tidal Whitelake channel, and from there to the River Teign and the docks. The first three locks did not originally have side walls, but used earth banks instead, which were replaced with timber or brick walls in due course. The Graving Dock lock was only 56 ft (17 m) long, and so could take a single barge, but all the others were long enough to take two barges end to end. The first Jetty Marsh lock was much bigger, at 215 by 45 feet (66 m × 14 m), but carries the inscription Duke of Somerset, 1841, and so it would appear that it was reconstructed as a basin, so that barges could wait in it for the tide. The Graving Dock lock is probably unique in the United Kingdom, in that it was reconstructed with a dock at its side, which could be used as a dry dock when the lock was empty. (The Cefn Flight of locks, or 14 lock flight, on the Crumlin Arm of the Mon & Brec Canal, has one lock with a similar 'dry dock' build into the site of the lock chamber.) Both Jetty Marsh lock and Graving Dock lock are currently Grade II listed.

Having invested most of his capital in the project, James Templer was rewarded by the success of the canal. A major contract with Josiah Wedgwood and Sons was re-established in 1798. Wedgwood remained the major recipient of the ball clay until 1815, after which trade was established with other pottery manufacturers and other ports.

Route of the canal in relation to other relevant features

James' son, George Templer built the Haytor Granite Tramway to connect his granite quarries at Haytor Rocks to the canal basin at Ventiford. It opened on 16 September 1820, and for the next 40 years, the traffic in granite supplemented the ball clay trade. The canal was sold in 1829 by George Templer, along with the Stover estate and the quarries and tramway, to Edward St Maur, 11th Duke of Somerset (1775-1855). When plans to build the Moretonhampstead and South Devon Railway were proposed, his son the 12th Duke of Somerset, who by then had inherited the Stover estate, sought to sell both the canal and the trackbed of the derelict Granite Tramway to the fledgling railway company. It was duly sold for £8,000 on 4 June 1862, by which time the section above Teignbridge was effectively redundant, and so the railway company was not required to maintain it. However, the section up to Graving Dock lock was retained, so that users of the canal could still repair their barges, and it was at this point that the new dock was constructed which gave the Graving Dock lock its name. The canal was almost immediately leased to Watts, Blake and Co., a company who sank clay-pits.

The canal passed into the ownership of the Great Western Railway in 1877, but continued to be leased to Watts, Blake and Co., who paid a fixed price for its use, and were also required to maintain it. Traffic dwindled and finally ceased in 1937, but Watts, Blake and Company's latest 14-year lease did not end until 1942, and so it was not formally abandoned until March 1943. It remained in water until 1951, when one of the banks was breached, flooding a clay pit.

== Restoration ==
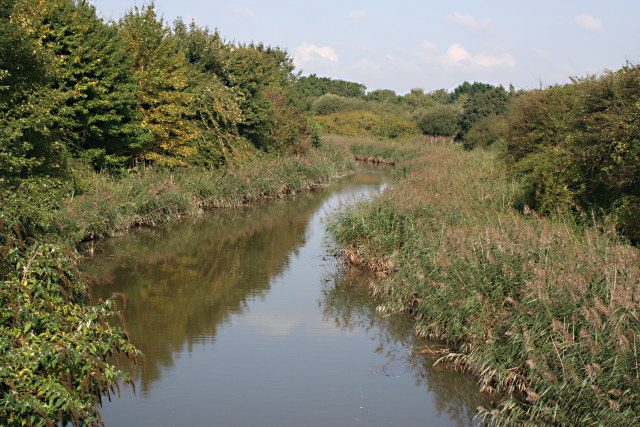
The canal seen from the bridge on the Newton Abbot to Kingsteignton road

In the late 1980s, parts of the towpath were incorporated into the Templer Way historical trail, created by Teignbridge District Council, who were by then owners of Jetty Marsh Lock and Ventiford Basin. The rest of the canal was owned by Railtrack. In early 1999, the West Country Branch of the Inland Waterways Association and the Newton Abbot Fishing Association approached Teignbridge District Council to suggest that they negotiate with Railtrack to obtain the rest of the canal. Plans for a local canal society came out of these talks, and the Stover Canal Society was formed in February 1999.

After negotiation, Railtrack agreed to hand over the canal to the District Council for leisure use. The Stover Canal Society worked with the District Council to formulate a strategy for its restoration, and this led to the creation of a Charitable Trust, on which the District Council, other local authorities and the Canal Society are all represented. Control of the remains passed to the Trust in February 2010, when a formal lease was signed. In 2013 the towpath was opened to public access; in 2014 the remains of a barge were excavated in Ventiford Basin and a new stretch of the granite tramway was discovered. Work was carried out on the Graving Dock Lock in 2015, aided by a grant from the Association for Industrial Archaeology. With labour provided by the Waterway Recovery Group, some of the stonework was dismantled, to allow tree roots to be removed, after which it was reinstated and the blockwork was repointed. Subsequently, a grant was received from the Tesco 'Bags of Help' scheme, and local craftsmen completed the work in 2016. Ventiford Basin was cleared of silt by staff from a local clay company in 2016, with the work uncovering the remains of two more barges and another section of the Haytor Granite Tramway. After the stonework had been repointed, a dam was built at the southern end of the basin, and it was relined with puddle clay, allowing it to refill with water during 2019.

== 2025 Breach ==
In January 2025, the canal suffered a breach near Kingsteignton when the heavy rains that occurred across much of England built up in the canal and caused some 60 metres (66 yd) of the canal and the adjacent railway embankment south of Teign Bridge to collapse. This resulted in the flooding of an adjacent clay quarry operated by mining company Sibelco.

== Points of interest ==
Point	Coordinates (Links to map resources)	OS Grid Ref	Notes
Ventiford Basin	50.5612°N 3.6275°W	SX848747	
Teigngrace Lock	50.5557°N 3.6250°W	SX849741	
Graving Dock Lock	50.5529°N 3.6207°W	SX852738	
Teignbridge Lock	50.5485°N 3.6154°W	SX856733	
Jn with WhiteLake Channel	50.5379°N 3.6080°W	SX861721	Jetty Marsh Lock

== See also ==
- Haytor Granite Tramway

== Bibliography ==
- Ewans, M.C. (1966). The Haytor Granite Tramway and Stover Canal. Newton Abbot: David & Charles.
- Harris, Helen; Thurlow, George (1994). The Haytor Granite Tramway and Stover Canal. Peninsula Press. ISBN 978-1-872640-28-0.
- Squires, Roger (2008). Britain's restored canals. Landmark Publishing. ISBN 978-1-84306-331-5.
