= Whiteway, Kingsteignton =

Historic estate in Devon, England

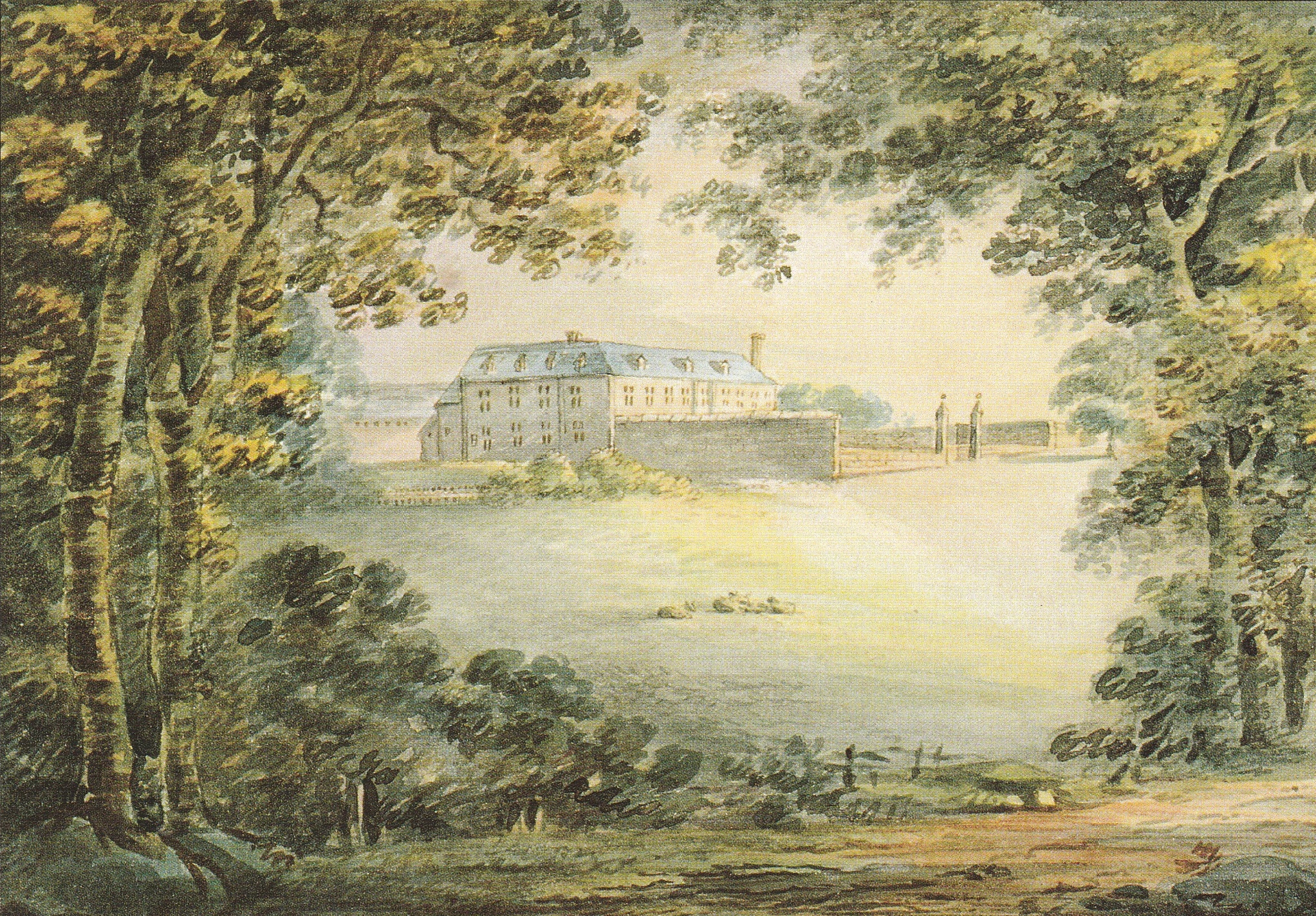
"Whiteway, seat of the Yardes", watercolour by Reverend John Swete (died 1821) dated 10 July 1795. Devon Record Office: DRO 564M/F8/119

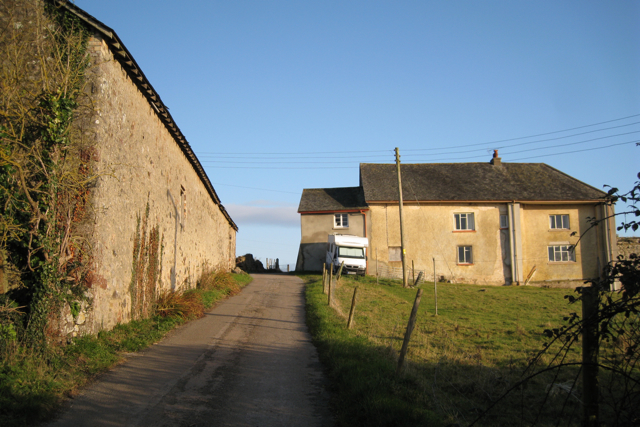
Whiteway Barton in 2009

Whiteway is an historic estate in the parish of Kingsteignton, Devon. It should be distinguished from Whiteway House in the parish of Chudleigh, Devon, 4 3/4 miles (7.6 km) to the north, in the 18th century a seat of the Parker family of Saltram.

== Descent ==
=== de Moels ===
WITEWEI is a manor listed in the Domesday Book of 1068 as the 157th of the 176 Devonshire possessions of Baldwin de Moels (died 1090), Sheriff of Devon, feudal baron of Okehampton, one of the Devon Domesday Book tenants-in-chief of King William the Conqueror. His tenant in 1068 was Ranulf and the manor was stated to include a salt-house, taxed at 12 d. per annum.

=== Feudal barony of Plympton ===
Whiteway was later a possession of the feudal barony of Plympton, of which the barons were the Courtenay family, Earls of Devon, also heirs of the de Moels's feudal barony of Okehampton.

==== Burdon /de la Torre ====
The tenants of Whyteweye listed in the Book of Fees (c.1302) were Nicholas Burdon and Martin de la Torre.

=== Yard ===
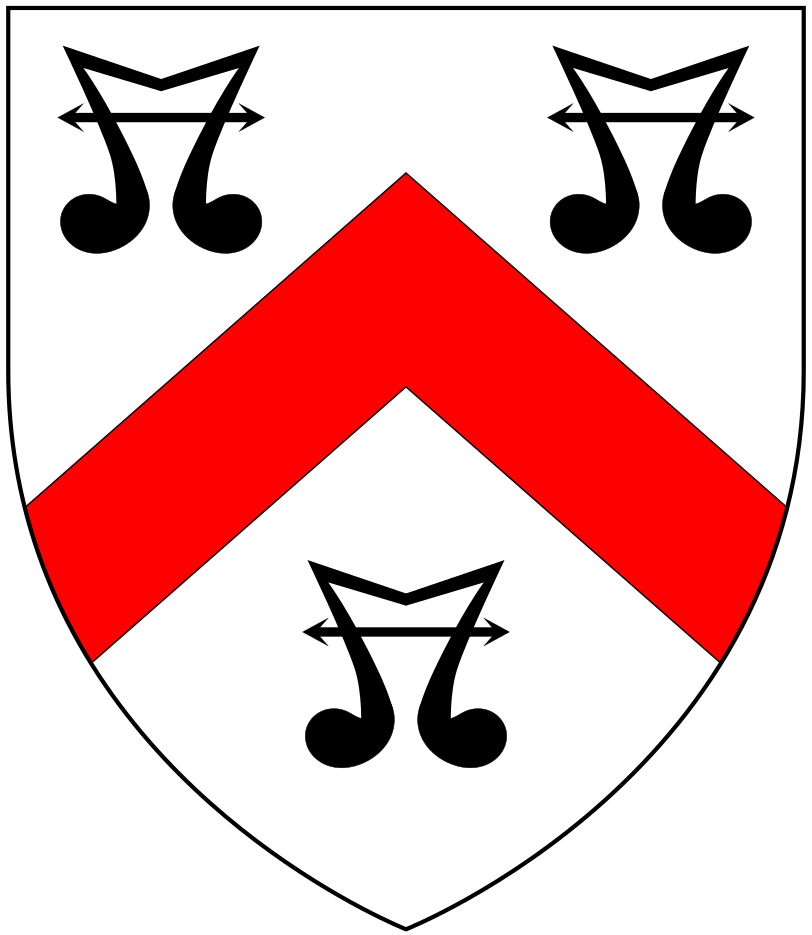
Arms of Yarde: Argent, a chevron gules between three water bougets sable

According to the Devon topographer Rev. John Swete (1752–1821) Whiteway was later a seat of a branch of the prominent Devonshire gentry family of Yard, of which his mother was a member. The Yard family had originated at the manor of Yarde in the parish of Malborough, Devon, and then, according to Swete, split into three main branches: Bradley, in the parish of Kingsteignton; Churston Ferrers and Whiteway. Other branches were later seated at Teignwick, Kingsteignton and at Sharpham, Ashprington.

In 1795 during one of his Picturesque Tours around Devon, Swete passed by Whiteway and made a watercolour painting of the then larger mansion house, entitled "Whiteway, seat of the Yardes" and dated 10 July 1795. The painting is now in the collection of the Devon Records Office. Swete wrote of the visit as follows in his Travel Journal:

"Of this mansion I took the following sketch, induced thereto not so much by its respectability or situation, both of which however have enough to attract notice, as from its having given birth to my mother and been the place of residence of her ancestors for centuries... Whiteway, the abode of farmers occupiers of the estates: such is the vicissitude of things. The buildings here for the period in which they were raised had rather a respectable appearance, and situate as it is on a knoll, it had command of the little valley, looked full upon the picturesque wood from whence i was making my observations".

=== 2017 ===
Today the remnant of Whiteway is a grade II listed farmhouse known as Whiteway Barton, and situated in the grounds is the "Whiteway Barton Motocross Track", a "hardpack track in a steep valley, 3/4 mile in length, natural with a selection of jumps and tabletops".
