= River Sig =

River in Devon, England

Coordinates: 50°32′58″N 3°43′32″W

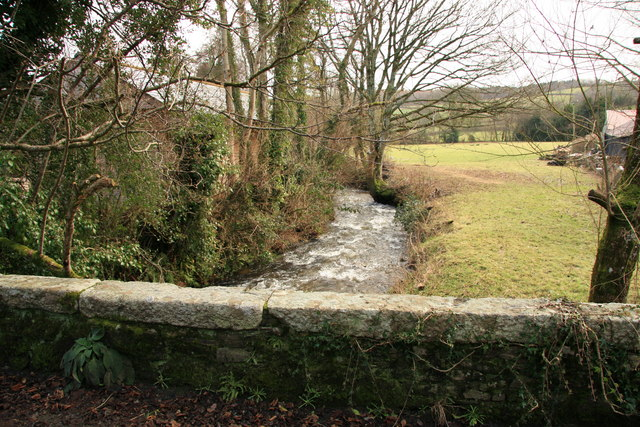
The River Sig at Sigford in 2009

The River Sig is a 2.4-mile-long (3.9 km) river on Dartmoor in the county of Devon, England. It is a tributary to the River Lemon, which it meets at Sigford.

== Course ==
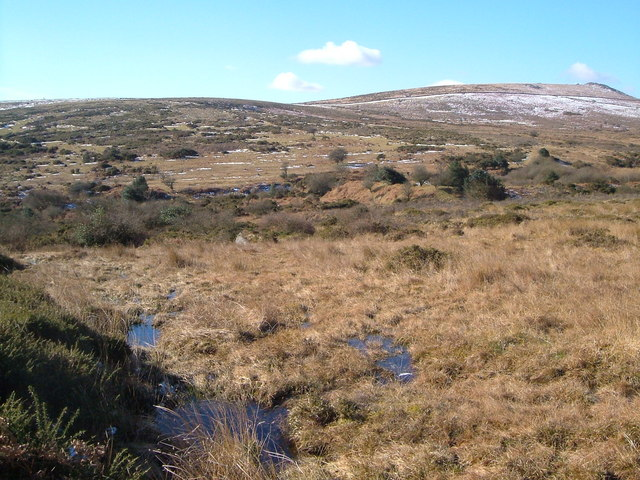
The Sig forming out of marshy ground near Bagtor Down.

The river starts from marshland just to the south of Saddle Tor and the B3387 road on moorland, near Bag Tor Mire.

It then flows south east, leaving the moor into forest before the Langworthy Brook joins from the right bank. It passes to the west of the village of Sigford before flowing into the Lemon, and therefore, indirectly flowing into the Teign. The River Sig and the River Lemon spring within 5,000 feet (1,500 m) of one another.
