= Phil Joslin =

Phil Joslin may refer to:

- Phil Joslin (footballer) (1916–1980), English footballer
- Phil Joslin (referee) (born 1959), English football referee
