= Teign Bridge =

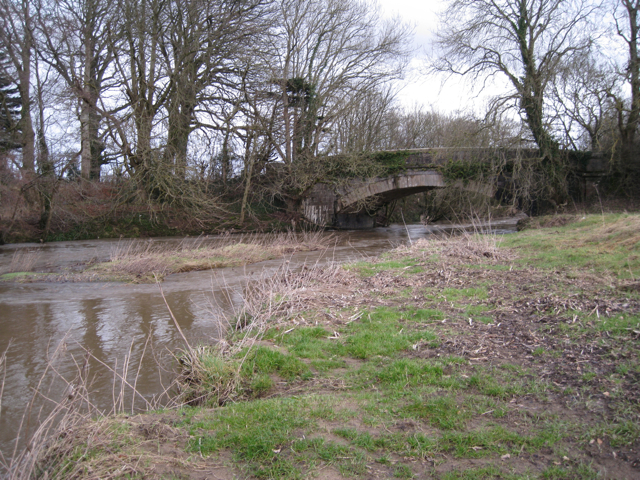
- Teign Bridge
- Coordinates: 50.549693°N 3.611927°W
- Carries: Exeter Road
- Crosses: River Teign
- Locale: Kingsteignton
- Heritage status: Grade II listed
- List Entry Number: 1317451
- Preceded by: Grey Bridge

Characteristics
- Material: Limestone, granite
- No. of spans: 1

History
- Construction end: 1815

The Teign Bridge is a road bridge over the River Teign near Kingsteignton, Devon carrying the Exeter Road across the river. It has been Grade II listed since 1987.

== Description ==
Teign Bridge is a single span bridge with a wide segmental arch. It is constructed from local grey limestone with granite voussoirs to the arch rings along with granite intrados and copping to the parapets.

== History ==
The current bridge was constructed in 1815 and overseen by James Green who was a County Surveyor.

The footings of earlier cutwaters are said to survive below the current Teign Bridge. Archaeological evidence has been found of a sequence of bridges on this site including traces of a potentially Roman bridge, an approximately 11th century bridge, the medieval 'Red Bridge' and the 'Grey Bridge' from around the 17th century.
