= Sayala Mace =

Ceremonial mace from Predynastic Egypt

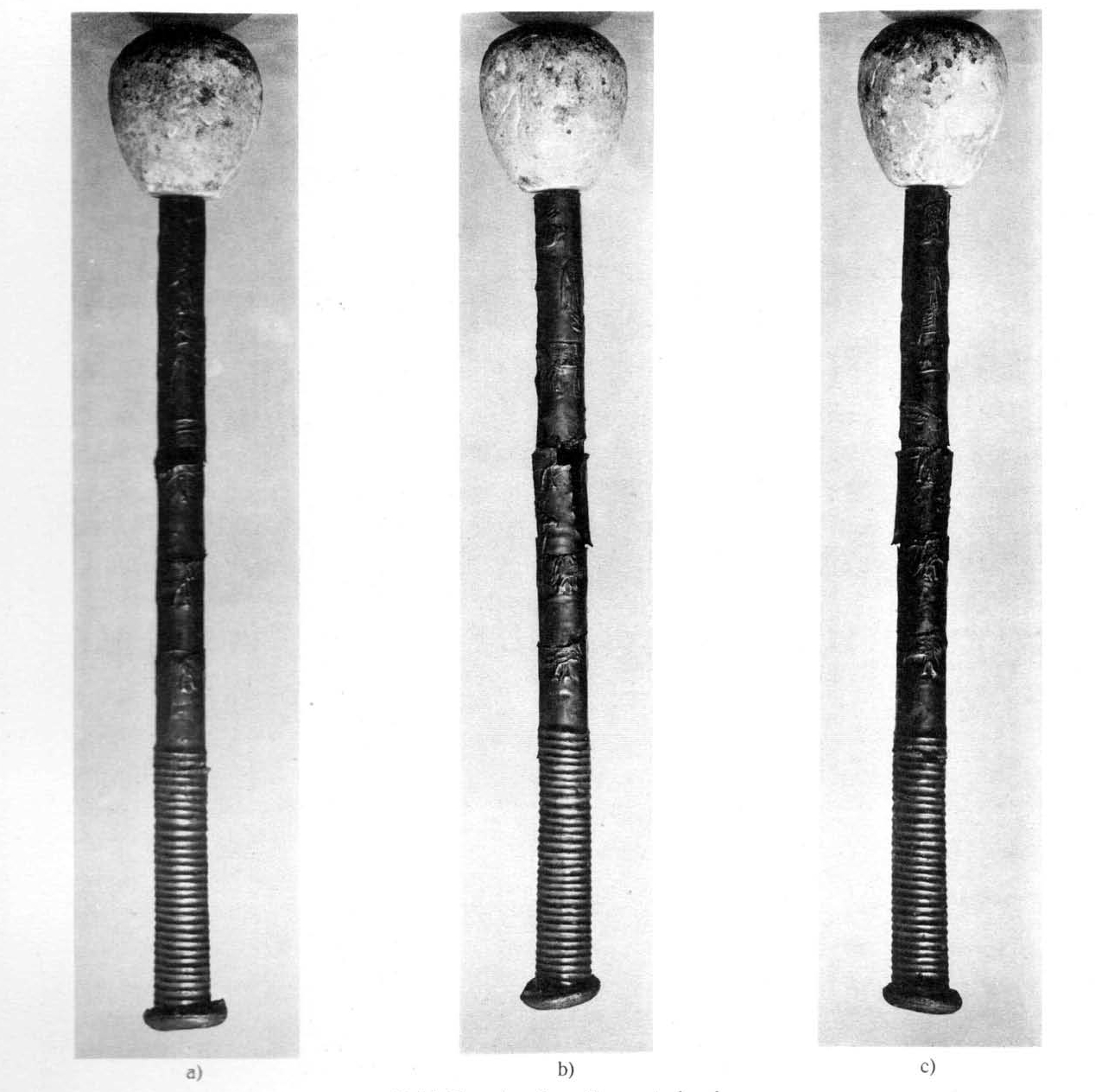
- The mace in 1910
- Material: Handle: wood (lost) and gold plating Head: breccia or rose quartz
- Created: c. 3200 BC
- Discovered: 1910; Sayala, Aswan, Egypt
- Discovered by: Cecil Firth
- Present location: Egyptian Museum, Cairo, Egypt until 1920, thereafter unknown

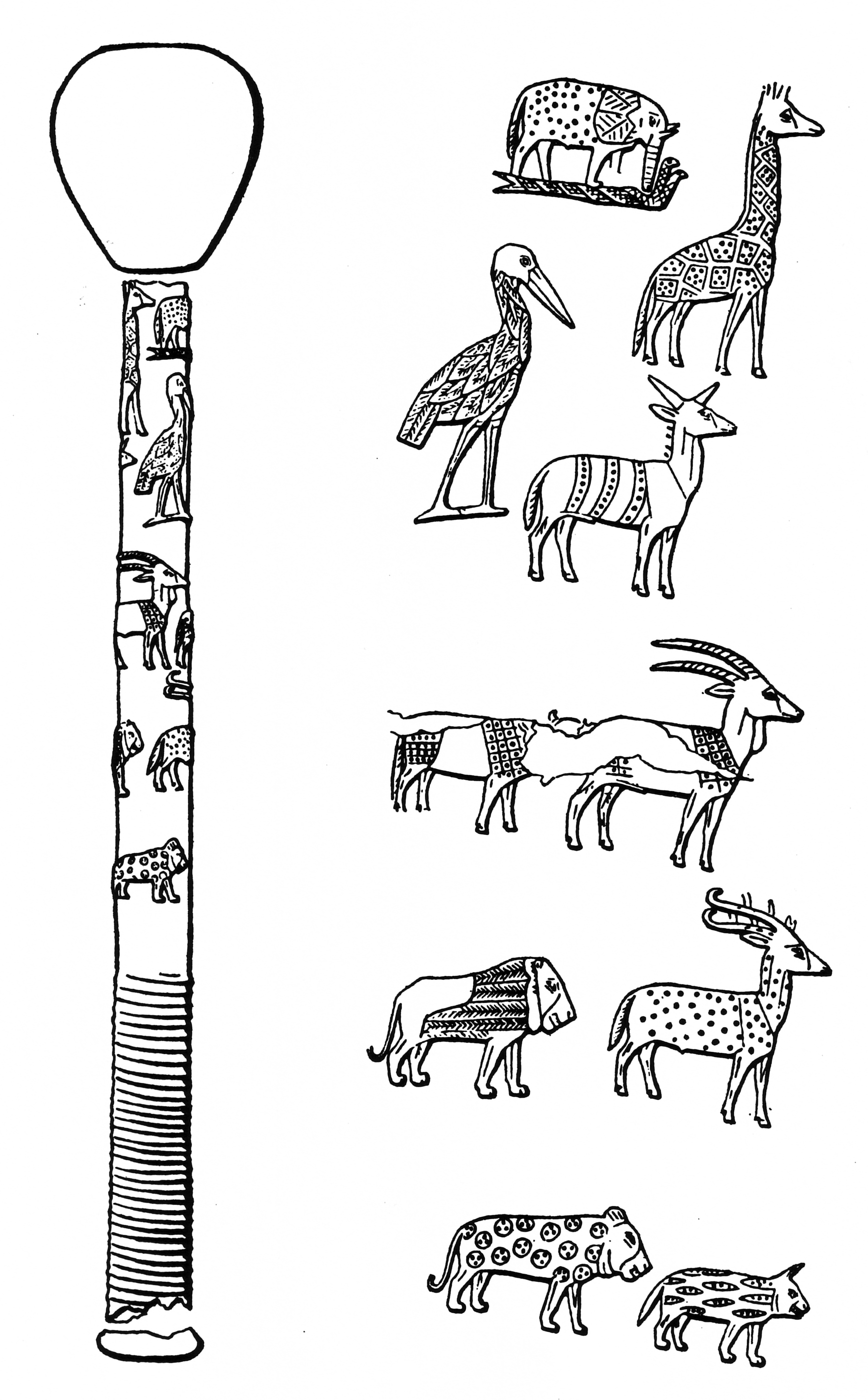
Sketch of the mace and its decorations

The Sayala Mace or Seyala Mace is a ceremonial mace made of gold plated wood and stone, from Predynastic Egypt (Naqada IIIa, c. 3200 BC). It was found by Cecil Firth in 1910 at Sayala in Lower Nubia and subsequently kept in the Egyptian Museum in Cairo until it was stolen in 1920. Its later fate is unknown. The mace is especially significant for the detailed depictions of animals on its handle.

== Discovery ==
The mace was found by Cecil Firth in 1910 during excavations in Sayala in Grave 1 of Cemetery 137. The grave, which probably belonged to the local ruler, had already been plundered, but still contained many grave goods, which had been crammed into one corner of the grave. These consisted of stone and ceramic artefacts: a rose quartz head of a lion, a cosmetic palette, copper chisels and hatchets, and the remnants of two ceremonial maces. The maceheads in breccia or rose quartz survived, as well as the gold plating of the lost wooden handle. Both sets of gold plating had horizontal ribbing on the lower part. There was no other decoration on one of the sets of gold plating, but that of the Sayala Mace had detailed images of animals (see below).

Firth made the grave and its contents known in a preliminary report of 1911. In this publication he included the first sketch of the mace. However, a detailed description, containing photographs did not appear until 1927. In the meanwhile, the Sayala Mace had been stolen from the Egyptian Museum in Cairo in 1920.

== Decoration ==
The upper area of the handle was decorated all around with pictures of animals. An elephant was depicted at the top, stomping on two snakes. The significance of this is disputed. After this, there is a giraffe, a saddle-billed stork, several bovids and carnivores, such as a lion and a leopard.

The mace is part of a larger group of Naqada period artworks depicting series of animals, such as the handle of a comb and several knife handles (e.g. Brooklyn Knife handle, Carnavon Knife handle, Pitt-Rivers Knife handle, Gebel el-Tarif Knife, Gebel el-Arak Knife). No other mace is known with comparable decoration.

== Bibliography ==
- Rainer Michael Boehmer. "Orientalische Einflüsse auf verzierten Messergriffen aus dem prädynastischen Ägypten." Archäologische Mitteilungen aus Iran. New Series, Vol. 7 (1974): 15–40.
- Günter Dreyer. "Motive und Datierung der dekorierten prädynastischen Messergriffe." in Christiane Ziegler (ed.) L'art de l'Ancien Empire égyptien. Actes du colloque organisé au musée du Louvre par le Service culturel les 3 et 4 avril 1998. La Documentation française: Musée du Louvre, Paris 1999, ISBN 2-11-004264-8, pp. 195–226.
- Cecil M. Firth. "The Archaeological Survey of Nubia." Bulletin. No. 7 (1911): S. 13–14, 18, (Online version).
- Cecil M. Firth. The Archaeological Survey of Nubia. Report for 1910-1911. Government Press, Cairo 1927, pp. 204–208.
- Helene J. Kantor. "The Final Phase of Predynastic Culture. Gerzean or Semainean(?)" Journal of Near Eastern Studies. Vol. 3 (1944), pp. 110–136.
