= Bradley (house) =

Medieval manor house in Devon, England

Coordinates: 50°31′34″N 3°37′33″W

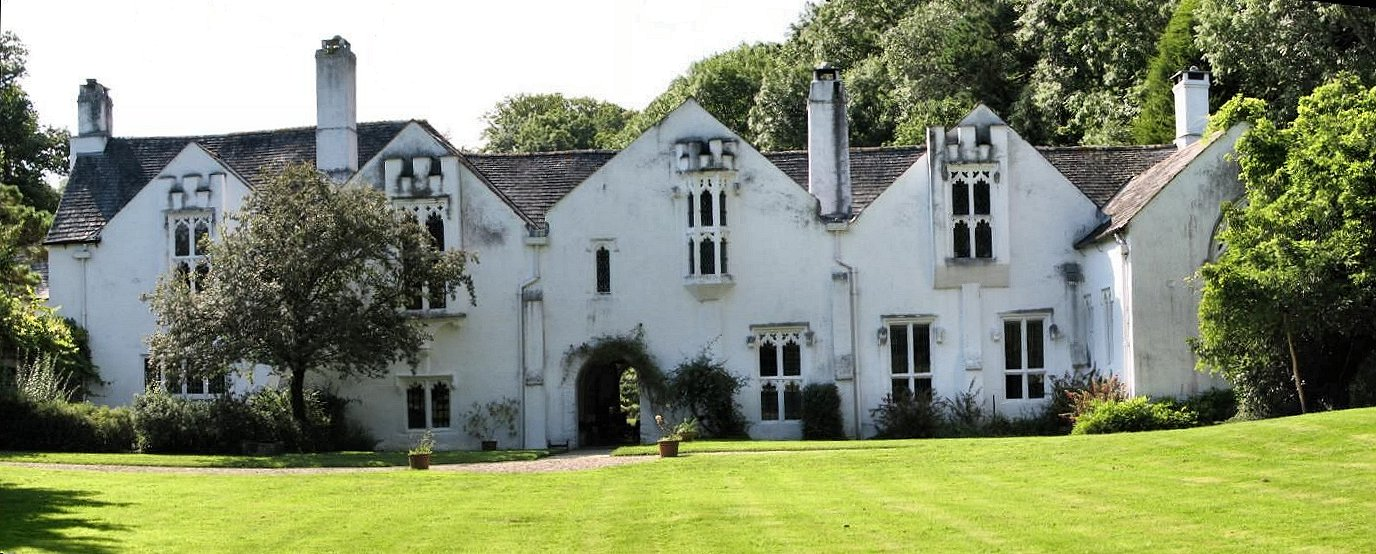
The east front of Bradley

Bradley is a medieval manor house in Newton Abbot, Devon, England. It is set amongst woodland and meadows in the valley of the River Lemon about a half mile to the west of the main town. The house is now in the ownership of the National Trust.

== The house ==
Bradley is one of the smaller manor houses of the early fifteenth century, and has the advantage of having a contemporary chapel detached from the main house. The architect may have been influenced by Dartington Hall, some six miles to the south. Interesting features include the missing gatehouse, the interior of the chapel, the fenestration of the east front and the wall paintings.

The house is one of the most complete medieval manor houses in Devon. Much of it is the creation of Richard and Joan Yarde who owned it from 1402. Richard Yarde was Sheriff of Devon in 1442. On the walls of an upstairs room is preserved a late medieval pattern of stencilled black fleur-de-lys. The great hall is emblazoned with the royal arms of Elizabeth I, and there are a number of other rare features. There was a gatehouse until the mid nineteenth century when it was demolished. The woods surrounding the house have been designated as a SSSI, being a fine example of natural limestone woodland.

The chapel was consecrated in 1428 and is just 21 ft (6.4 m). It is a simple building with a stone altar, a fine east window, a tiny gallery and the original wagon-shaped braced-collar roof. It was desecrated in the Protestant Reformation and later used in different periods as a poultry house, a billiard room, a dining room and a barn. The roof was restored in 1993. The house contains a collection of Pre-Raphaelite art and Arts and Crafts furniture.

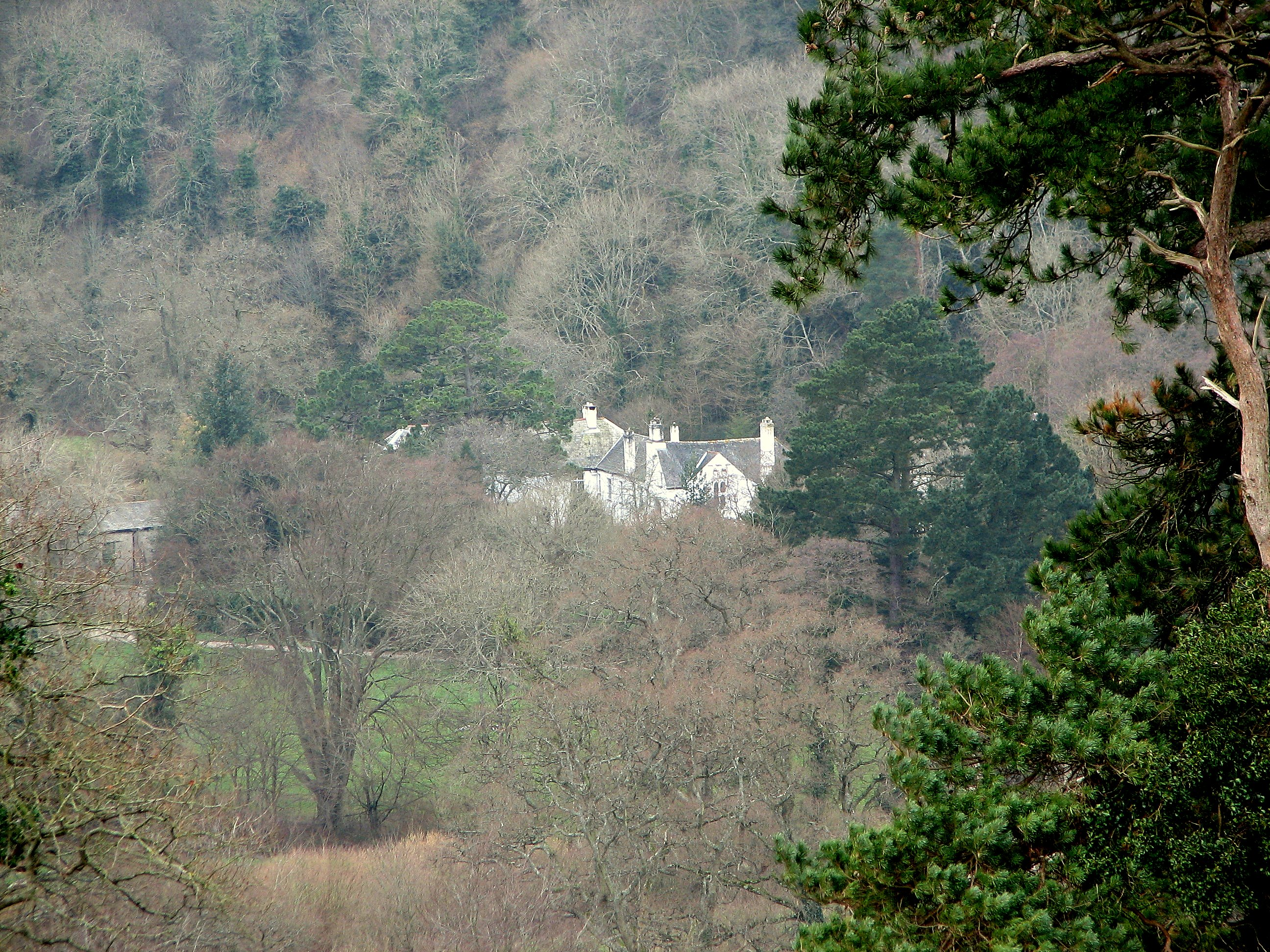
A distant view of Bradley showing its location in the wooded valley.

Flowing past the house is the Bradley Leat which used to provide water for the manorial mills which were located where the cattle market in Newton Abbot now stands. Bradley was given to the National Trust in 1938 by Diana Woolner, daughter of the Egyptologists Cecil Mallaby Firth and Freda Hansard. Her family still live in the house and manage it on the Trust's behalf.

== See also ==
- Puritan's Pit, nearby on the opposite bank of the River Lemon, was used for nonconformist services in the 17th century.
- The Great Western Railway built a series of 4-6-0 steam locomotives known as the Manor class, named after various manor houses. Locomotive 7802 was named after Bradley Manor and is preserved on the Severn Valley Railway.
