= River Teign =

River in Devon, England

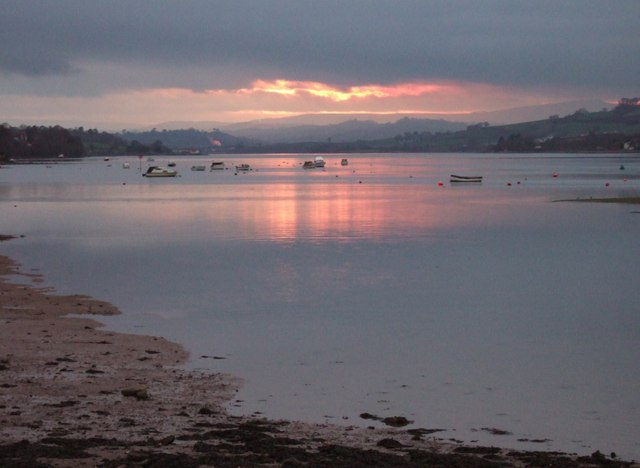
- The Teign estuary at sunset

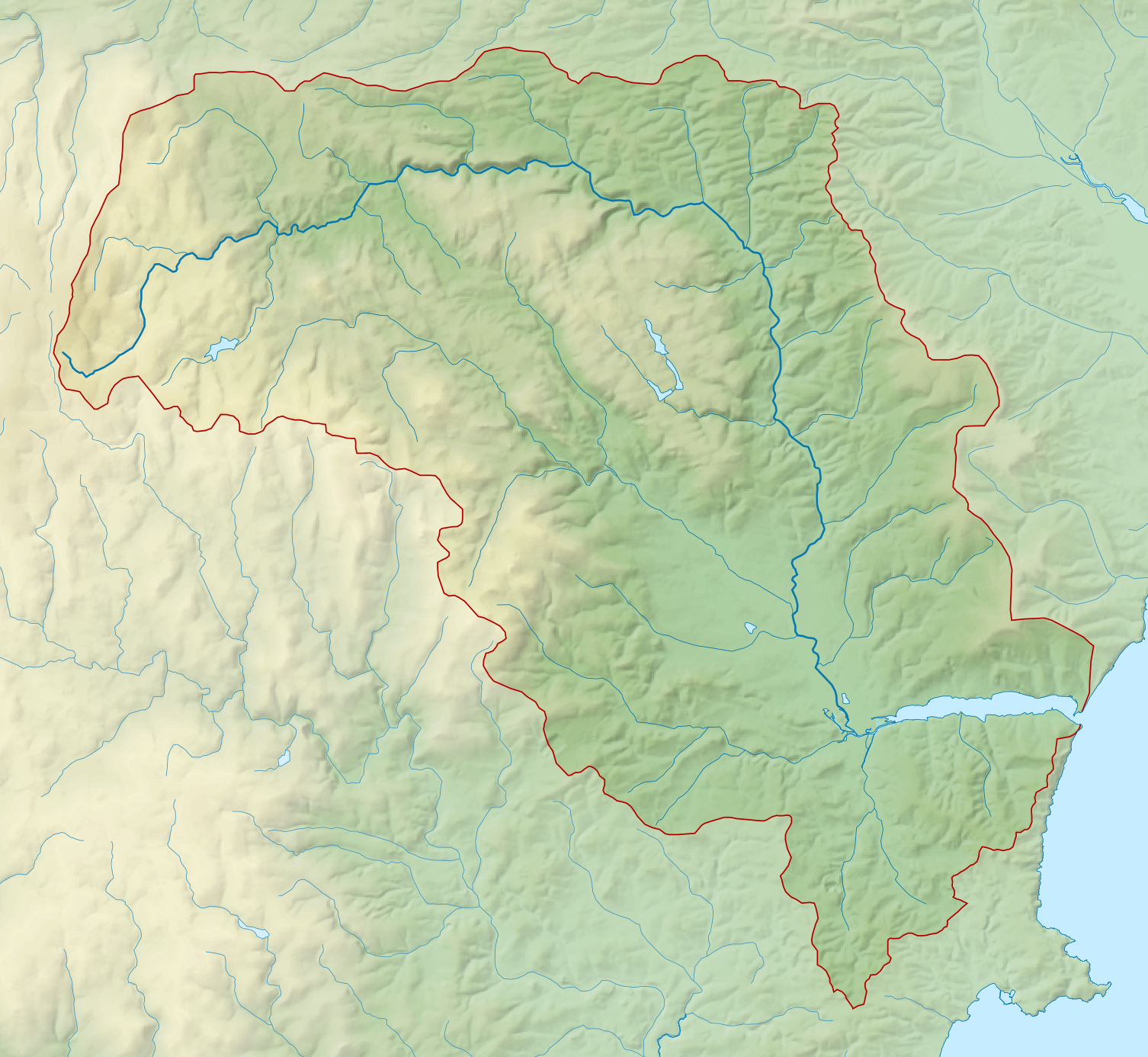
- Map showing the course and catchment of the Teign.

- Location within Devon

Location
- Country: England
- County: Devon
- Towns: Teignmouth; Newton Abbot; Kingsteignton

Physical characteristics
- Source
  - coordinates: 50°38′19″N 003°57′31″W
  - elevation: 528 m (1,732 ft)
- Mouth: Lyme Bay
  - location: English Channel
  - coordinates: 50°32′23″N 3°30′2″W
  - elevation: 0 m (0 ft)
- Length: 31 mi (50 km)

Basin features
- Tributaries
  - left: Blackaton Brook, Fingle Brook, Reedy Brook, Sowton Brook, Bramble Brook, Kate Brook, Well Head Brook
  - right: Beadon Brook, River Bovey, River Lemon, Aller Brook

The River Teign /ˈtiːn/ is a river in the county of Devon, England. It is 31 mi (50 km) long and rises on Dartmoor, becomes an estuary just below Newton Abbot and reaches the English Channel at Teignmouth.

== Toponymy ==
The river-name Teign is first attested in an Anglo-Saxon charter of 739, where it appears as Teng. The name is pre-Roman, related to the Welsh taen meaning 'sprinkling', or 'spread out' and means simply 'stream'.

The river lends its name to several places, including Teigncombe, Drewsteignton, Canonteign, Teigngrace, Kingsteignton (at one time, one of England's largest villages), Bishopsteignton, Teignharvey, and the second largest settlement along its course, Teignmouth. However, the villages of Combeinteignhead and Stokeinteignhead, on the other side of the estuary from Bishopsteignton, are not named after the river.

== Course ==
The River Teign rises on Dartmoor, as do many other major Devonian rivers. It has two separate sources: one rises at Teign Head, forming the North Teign which flows northeast where it is crossed by a clapper bridge near Teigncombe. On its bank near the confluence with the Walla Brook is the Tolmen Stone that is perforated by a large circular hole. The second source rises near Grey Wethers and forms the shorter South Teign which flows through the Fernworthy Forest and a reservoir of the same name. The two rivers combine at Leigh Bridge near Chagford to form the Teign, which leaves the moor on its eastern side, flowing beneath Castle Drogo in a steep-sided valley. Near Dunsford there is a nature reserve on the east bank.

It then flows southwards at the east edge of the moor through a steep-sided valley along which ran the Teign Valley Line providing rail service to the villages in the vicinity until its closure in 1967. Near Trusham the Beadon Brook joins, bringing overspill from the Tottiford, Kennick, and Trenchford Reservoirs.

Passing Chudleigh and Chudleigh Knighton, the river flows through the Bovey Basin where ball clay is extracted, then between Kingsteignton and Newton Abbot, where, during its operation from 1898 to 1974, the Newton Abbot power station drew its cooling water from the river, discharging it back into the River Lemon, which joins the Teign downstream.

Below Newton Abbot the river turns abruptly to the east and becomes tidal, widening to form the Teign Estuary, a large ria that reaches the English Channel at Teignmouth.

== Crossings ==
Fingle Bridge is a Grade II* listed structure that crosses the river near Drewsteignton on Dartmoor.

Until 1827 the most downstream bridge was Teign Bridge at Teigngrace. When it was being rebuilt in 1815 it became apparent that at least four successive bridges had been erected at various times with or over the remains of the previous constructions. Mr. P. T. Taylor, who investigated the matter at the time, gave as his opinion that:

the last or upper work was done in the sixteenth century, and that the red bridge had been built on the salt marsh in the thirteenth century; since which time there has been an accumulation of soil to the depth of ten feet. He supposes the wooden bridge to be old as the Conquest, and the white stone bridge to have been Roman work.

In 1976 a viaduct was built across the top of the estuary just below Newton Abbot to carry the newly diverted A380 road. The viaduct is about 550 m (0.34 mi) long and has eleven spans.

Since 1827 the lowest road crossing has been Shaldon Bridge that now carries the A379 near the mouth of the estuary. A passenger ferry between Teignmouth and Shaldon operates a little lower down.

== Navigability ==
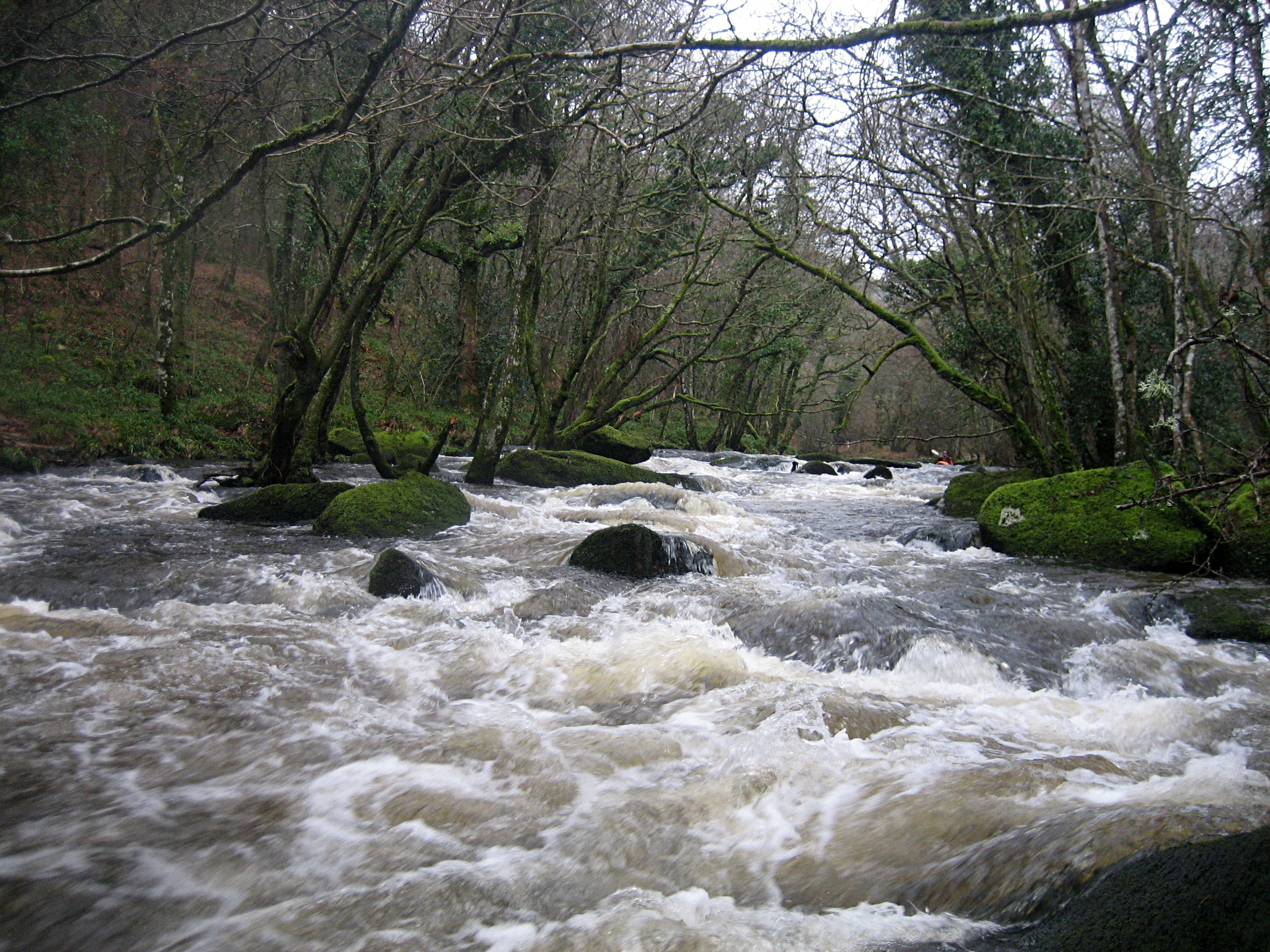
The Teign near Fingle Bridge and Castle Drogo, with a kayaker in the background

=== Ships and barges ===
The port of Teignmouth, just inside the mouth of the estuary, is visited by ships mostly handling clay, timber and grain.

The lower reaches of the river are navigable up to Newton Abbot, although now only to shallow draft boats and those less than 2.9 metres high due to the Shaldon Bridge.

The tidal Whitelake Channel of the river connects it to two disused short canals that were both built to serve the ball clay trade in the area. The Stover Canal heads to Teigngrace (with the River Teign also supplying the header pond); it was built to serve ball clay operations, but later it was the terminus of the Haytor Granite Tramway, carrying granite. The second connection was to the Hackney Canal, only 0.6 miles long, that connected the river to a ball clay quarry at Hackney Clay Cellars in Kingsteignton (now the site of a retail park), through what is now Newton Abbot Racecourse.

=== Personal watercraft ===
The river has been kayaked at least from Leigh Bridge (the confluence of the North and South Teign) at SX68358765 to Steps Bridge at SX80438835, rated as grade 2 to 3. There is also a single high-grade, very technical drop.

== Fishing ==
The Teign estuary is known for flounder fishing; a British record specimen was caught here in 1994. Other species include grey mullet in the estuary, brown trout further up the river and some salmon and sea trout throughout. Some coarse fish are caught in the lower reaches of Teign, although it is not officially a coarse fish river. This includes carp as far as the tidal marshes under the A380 at Newton Abbot.

== See also ==
- Rivers of the United Kingdom
- Haytor Granite Tramway – The Teign and its commercial past.
- Teign Valley Railway
