= Sigford =

Hamlet in Devon, England

Coordinates: 50°33′04″N 3°43′42″W

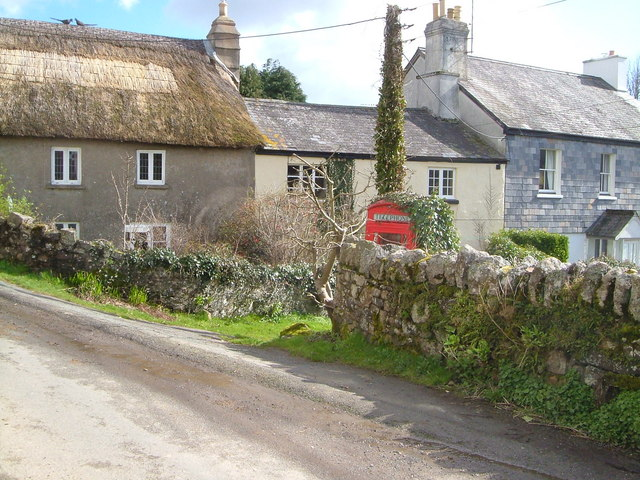
Sigford

Sigford is a small hamlet in the Parish of Ilsington, on the eastern edge of Dartmoor, Devon, England. It is situated at the confluence of three rivers, although the name of the settlement refers to just one of these, the River Sig. The other two rivers are the Lemon and Langworthy Brook.

Upstream from Sigford on Langworthy Brook are a number of old arsenic and tin mines, and at times the river water can appear bright red.
