= Teign School =

Location
- Chudleigh Road; Newton Abbot, Devon, TQ12 3JG; England
- Coordinates: 50.55391°N 3.60244°W

Information
- Type: Secondary Academy
- Religious affiliation
- Established: 2011
- Trust: Education South West
- Department for Education URN: 136494 Tables
- Ofsted: Reports
- Head teacher: Lucie Wagner
- Gender: Coeducational
- Age: 11 to 18
- Enrolment: 1,180 (Data from January 2015)
- Capacity: 1,353 (Data from January 2015)
- Website: http://www.teignacademy.co.uk/

Teign School is an 11–18 academy school located in Kingsteignton, a town to the north of Newton Abbot. The original 1936 building has been expanded upon substantially and numerous additional buildings have been constructed within the grounds. The school has entry level at Year 7. The school also has a sixth form centre. In 2004 it was awarded specialist Science status by the Specialist Schools Trust. The most recent Ofsted inspection was on 16 April 2015 which resulted in a 'good' rating.

== History ==
The school was previously Kingsteignton Senior School.

== Tuberculosis outbreak ==
In 2015 there was an outbreak of Tuberculosis (TB) at the school. On 25 March 2015, the headteacher Mark Woodlock sent a letter to students and parents explaining that "a student in Year 10 at Teign School has been diagnosed with Tuberculosis". In all about two hundred pupils were diagnosed with latent TB (the form of the disease which is not infectious) and ten were treated for the more serious, active form of TB. The initial infection probably came from a pupil from overseas who was not diagnosed with TB until he left the school in the summer of 2014. His former classmates were tested in February 2015 with additional screening in April of years 10 to 12 and then finally the whole school in June. Public Health England (PHE) which was responsible for the screening programme followed national guidelines that restrict screening firstly to family and former classmates. However, in October Dr Sarah Harrison, deputy director of health protection for PHE said that the testing "could have been done a bit quicker, and I think certainly for an infectious teenager we would be expecting things to happen a bit more quickly than they did". The story caught the attention of many local and national newspapers, including the BBC which broadcast an episode of Inside Out South West on the outbreak.
