= River Lemon Valley Woods =

Protected area in Devon, England

Coordinates: 50°31′30″N 3°37′37″W

River Lemon Valley Woods is a Site of Special Scientific Interest (SSSI) in Devon, England. It is located on the western edge of Newton Abbot and encompasses part of the valley of the River Lemon. The River Lemon has formed a steep-sided valley here. This protected area has both exceptional ancient semi-natural woodland and important exposures of Devonian geology and associated fossils.

Historically this protected area was called Chercombe Bridge Old Quarry.

== Biology ==
Woodland trees include ash, pedunculate oak, beech, small-leaved lime, field maple, sycamore and alder. The shrub layer includes hazel, wild service-tree, spindle, wayfaring tree, guelder rose, dogwood and crab apple. Plants present in this woodland also include butcher's broom, spurge laurel, bird's-nest orchid, wood vetch and small teasel.

Broadridge Quarry forms a clearing in the woodland. Plants growing on rock ledges include rock rose, wild thyme, dropwort and fragrant orchid. Moss species in this quarry include Grimmia orbicularis.

Insect species include the butterfly called white admiral. Fish species in the River Lemon include salmon, stone loach and bullhead.

== Geology ==
The site includes two disused quarries where limestone was extracted that are called Chercombe and Broadridge. These quarries show important exposures of Devonian limestone and fossils have been found here. Organisms fossilised in Chercombe Bridge Limestone include Amphipora, tabulate corals, stromatoporoids, brachiopods, gastropods and trilobites.

== Land ownership ==
Parts of River Lemon Valley Woods SSSI are owned by the National Trust.
