= Newton Abbot power station =

Power station in South Devon

Jetty Marsh Power Station
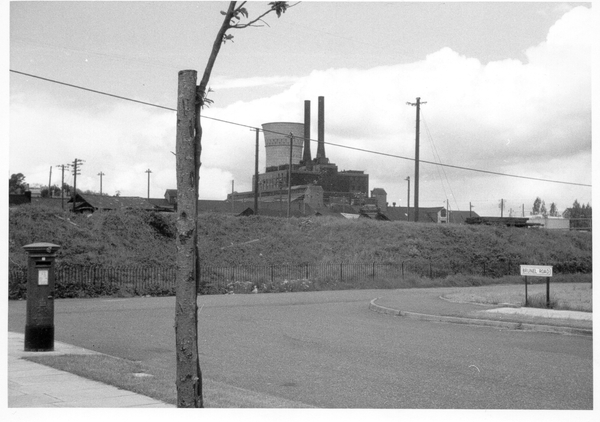
- View of the Power Station taken in 1962
- Official name: Newton Abbot Power Station
- Country: England
- Location: Newton Abbot, Devon
- Coordinates: 50.5336°N 3.6008°W
- Status: Decommissioned and demolished
- Commission date: 1898
- Decommission date: 1974
- Operators: Torquay Corporation, Urban Electricity Supply Company Limited, British Electricity Authority (1948–55), Central Electricity Authority (1955–57), Central Electricity Generating Board (1958–74)

Thermal power station
- Primary fuel: Coal

Power generation
- Units decommissioned: All
- Nameplate capacity: 52.5 MW
- Annual net output: see text

The Newton Abbot power station was a power station originally built in 1898 at Jetty Marsh, Newton Abbot as a small station to serve the local community. It was subsequently significantly expanded, and changed from direct current to alternating current when bought by the Torquay corporation in the 1920s to provide power across a wider area towards the coast.

It reached its peak capacity of 52.5 megawatts in 1948 - the same year that it was nationalised. The station was used less from the mid-1960s as more efficient plant was used via the national grid, and it was finally closed in 1974 with demolition following shortly after. The site is now a housing estate.

== History ==
From the late 1890s, both Newton Abbot and Torquay developed their own electricity generating capacity to serve the local areas. The Newton Abbot Electricity Generating Station was established by Urban Electricity Supply Company Limited with all direct current (DC) supply, being used mainly for industrial loads.

The site was located at Jetty Marsh, adjacent to the Moretonhampstead and South Devon Railway branch of the Great Western Railway, and between the River Teign and River Lemon. This allowed the station to receive coal deliveries both by rail, and by barge at the jetty. The power station also drew water from the Teign, before discharging it again in the Lemon.

The Torquay Corporation acquired the Urban Electricity Supply Company Limited on May 1, 1923 because it couldn't extend its existing station in Torquay at Beacon Quay on the seafront . The electricity plant comprised 3 ×90 kW and 1 × 250 kW reciprocating engines and generators producing 240 & 480 V DC. In 1923, the station generated 708,402 kWh of electricity, some of this was used in the plant, the total amount sold was 526,171 kWh. The revenue from sales of current was £4,332, this gave a surplus of revenue over expenses of £1,029.

The new station, serving both Newton Abbot and Torquay, was opened in 1924 contained a 3,000 kW turboalternator and some of the older plant from the Torquay power station. A further 3,000 kW machine was installed in 1925, followed by a 7,500 kW set in 1928 and a similar unit in 1931.

At the direction of the C.E.B., the first HP machine of 15,000 kW was commissioned in 1943. In July, 1948 a second 15,000 kW set came into service and represents the envisaged limit of the site development. During the development of the high-pressure section of the power station in 1940, a single, large cooling tower was built to satisfy the condenser demands of the new boilers, and this was a dominant feature of the Newton Abbot Skyline. The cooling tower had a rated capacity of 1,000,000 gallons per hour (1.26 m^{3}/s)

The plant at the station comprised:

- two Stirling boilers each 33,000 pounds per hour, operating at 265 psi and 650 °F,
- two Stirling boilers each 50,000 pounds per hour, operating at 265 psi and 750 °F,
- four Stirling boilers each 100,000 pounds per hour, operating at 425 psi and 825 °F,
- two 15 MW British Thomson-Houston turbo-alternators generating at 11 kV 50 Hz,
- two 7.5 MW British Thomson-Houston turbo-alternators generating at 11 kV 50 Hz,
- two 3.3 MW British Thomson-Houston turbo-alternators generating at 11 kV 50 Hz,
- one 225 kW Belliss turbo-alternator, 520 Volt DC,
- three rotary converters, 2 × 400 kW one 500 kW.

In 1948, electricity supply was nationalised, and the station became the responsibility of the British Electricity Authority (1948-1955) then the Central Electricity Authority (1955-1957) and finally the Central Electricity Generating Board (1958-1974). The electricity distribution and sales functions of the local authority were vested in the South Western Electricity Board. Once connected to the national grid, it was a smaller and less efficient station, and usage gradually declined, including long periods of 'cold' shutdown. In 1972, the output from the station was 27.106 GWh, and the load as a percentage of the output capacity was 8.8 percent.

In early 1972, coal supply issues led to problems in running the station, and by March, the CEGB announced that the station was likely to close completely by 1974, although this was dismissed by unions.

The station stopped producing electricity in 1973, before being formally closed in March 1974, marked by a ceremony with a plaque handed over to the town council. It was demolished shortly after, and by 1978 the power station site was completely cleared, with rubble used in other local building projects.

A Bellis and Morcom steam generating engine was preserved and survives at Poldark Mine museum in Cornwall, where it has been since 1972. Of the triple expansion type, it is believed to date from 1920.

== Installed generating capacity over time ==
Year	DC Generation (kw)	AC Generation (kw)	Notes
1898	120	-	3 x 40 kW
1920	520	-	+2 x 200 kW
1924	(200 SBy)	6250	+2x1250 Ex Torquay + 1 x 3750 kW
1926	(200 Sby)	10000	+1 x 3750 kW
1929	(200 SBy)	17500	+1 x 7500 kW
1930	(200 SBy)	15000	-2 x 1250 kW
1931	(200 SBy)	22500	+1 x 7500 kW
1941	(200 SBy)	37500	+1 x 15000 kW
1948	(200 SBy)	52500	+1 x 15000 kW
1959	(200 SBy)	52000	-500 kW Boilers Decommissioned
1972		45000	
1974	0	0	Closed

The output of the station is shown below.

Newton Abbot electricity output
Year	Output GWh	Running hours (load factor %)
1946	93.88	(28.2 %)
1955	109.341	5164
1956	99.117	4702
1957	111.824	5882
1958	105.674	6008
1961	36.73	
1962	22.85	
1963	45.2	
1967	78.81	(18.7 %)
1972	27.106	
