= Ringslade =

Historic estate in Devon, England

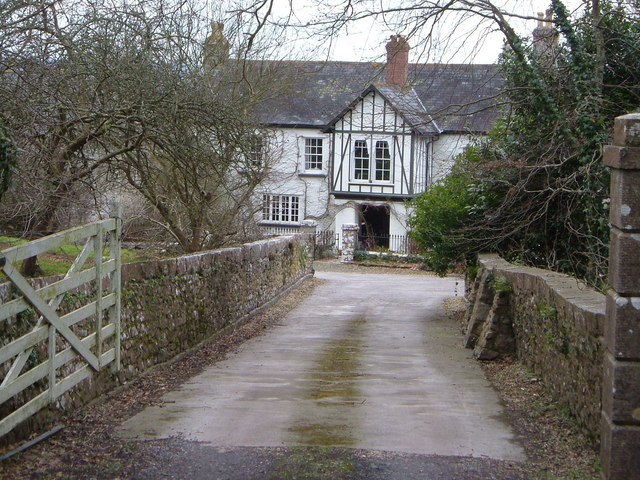
- Ringslade House seen from its gates
- Interactive map of Ringslade

General information
- Location: Ringslade, Ringslade Road, Highweek, Newton Abbot, Devon, England
- Coordinates: 50.540826°N 3.626934°W
- Completed: 16th century
- Renovated: Altered c.1730, c.1800 and c.1900
- Designations: Grade II listed

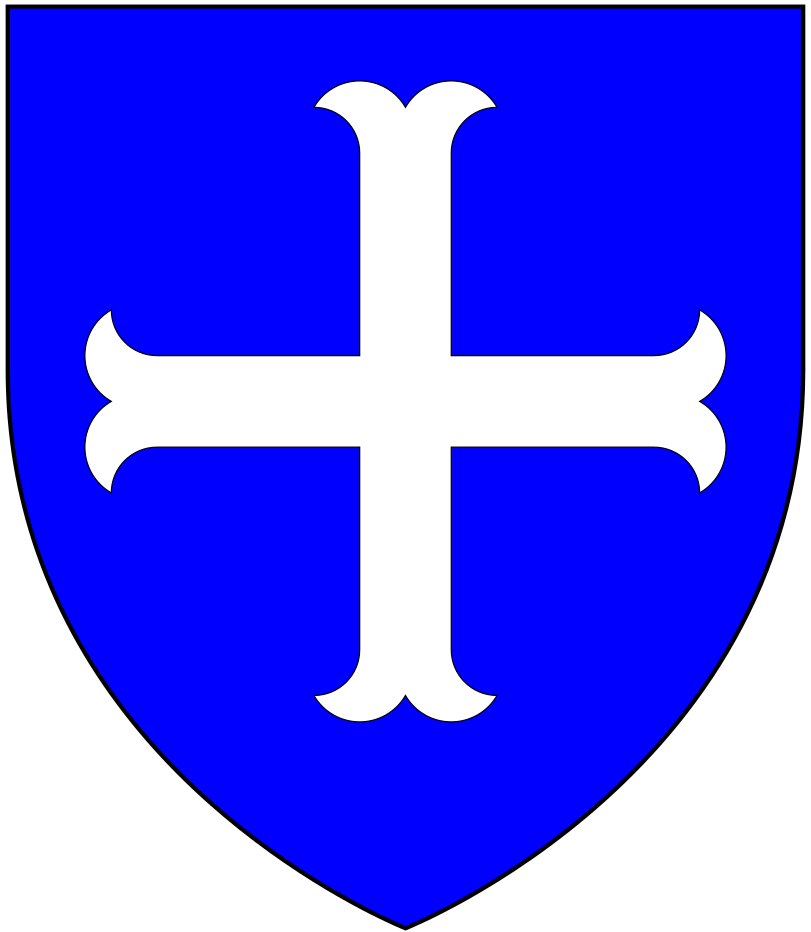
Arms of Segar of Highweek

Ringslade is a Grade II listed sixteenth century farmhouse in Highweek, Newton Abbot, Devon, England. It was granted Grade II status in June 1977, protecting it from unauthorised alteration or demolition, with the most recent amendment to the listing taking place in December 1996.

The estate of Ringslade in Highweek was first mentioned in the 13th century as Ryngeslad in 1238, later as 'Ryngeslade juxta Heghwyk' in 1301 & 'Ryngheslade' in 1330. The house and estate were the property of the Segar family from at least the 16th century until the 20th century. The Segar family were listed in the Heraldic Visitations of Devon in 1620 and the arms attributed to them by John Lambrick Vivian are Azure, a cross moline argent, the same arms used by Sir William Segar who whilst once thought to have been of Dutch descent is now believed to have been from an old Devonshire family.

The Segars served as feoffees of Highweek for several centuries, members of the family are listed records relating to the Highweek feoffees at least as early as 1566. In an article reporting the burial of feoffee and Highweek Parish councillor Alfred Buckland Segar in the family vault at All Saints Church in Highweek in 1933 they were described as having occupied Ringslade for over 300 years. The funeral of another Segar Highweek feoffee, John Segar, in 1920 was attended by Harold St Maur.

The Ringslade estate was purchased from the trustees of the estate of the recently deceased John Segar by relative Mr R. Segar in 1890. Mr R. Segar purchased the house and buildings purchased for £9,400 and an arable field on the estate for £350. A meadow was bought by a Mr W. Rowe for £555, a pasture field by a Mr Fairchild for £140, a piece of garden ground for £95, freehold ground rents of £9 per year to a Mr Morey for £255 and ground rents of £7 were withdrawn from the sale after Mr Morey had bid £200. At a total auction lot worth of £10,995 this represented a substantial estate for the day, simply adjusting for inflation this would be £1,232,391.77 in November 2025, however, in relation to relative output (Note: Relative output measures the amount of income or wealth relative to the total output of the economy. When compared to other incomes or wealth, it shows the relative "influence" of the owner of this income or wealth has in controlling the composition or total-amount of production in the economy. This measure uses the share of GDP) this would be £21,590,000 in 2024.
