= Freda Hansard =

English Egyptologist (1872 – 1937)

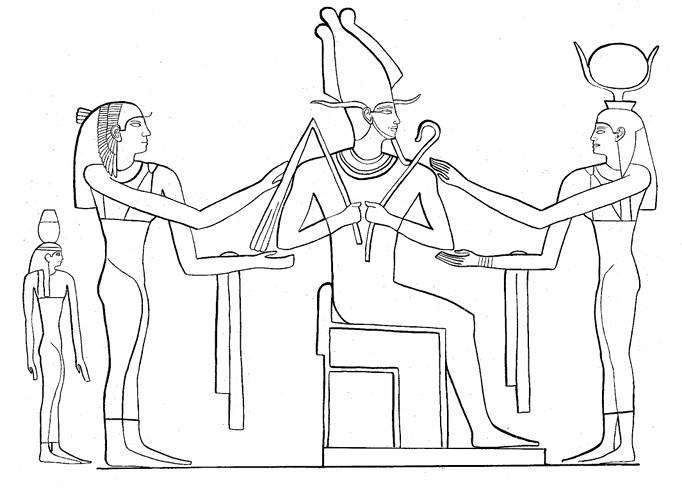
Illustration from the tomb of royal official Thary near Giza by Freda Firth and her husband, 1907

Winifred 'Freda' Nest Hansard (married name Firth, 1872 – 1937) was an English Egyptologist. Trained as an artist, she produced drawings replicating inscriptions in Egyptian tombs.

== Early life and artistic career ==
Freda was the younger daughter of the Reverend Septimus Hansard, vicar of Bethnal Green, and his wife Edith. She studied art at the Royal Academy Schools (1893 – 6) and Slade School of Art (1895 – 6). She exhibited paintings at the Royal Academy between 1899 and 1901.

== Egyptology ==
In 1902 Freda studied Egyptology at University College, London under Flinders Petrie. She accompanied him to excavations at Abydos and Saqqara in the 1902/3 and 1903/4 seasons, producing drawings of wall inscriptions in tombs along with Margaret Murray, Lina Eckenstein, Hilda Petrie, and Jessie Mothersole. Her drawings were exhibited at UCL.

In 1906 she married fellow Egyptologist Cecil Mallaby Firth. The pair worked together on drawings accompanying Petrie's excavations at Giza and Rifeh the next year.

== Later life ==
In the 1920s and 30s she and her daughter divided their time between Egypt (where Cecil was Inspector of Antiquities at Saqqara from 1923 until his death in 1931) and England, where Freda worked on restoring Bradley Manor, which she and her husband had bought in 1909. Their daughter Diana Woolner FSA (née Firth), who published on the archaeology of England and Malta, gave Bradley Manor to the National Trust in 1938.
