= Sticklepath Fault =

English strike slip fault

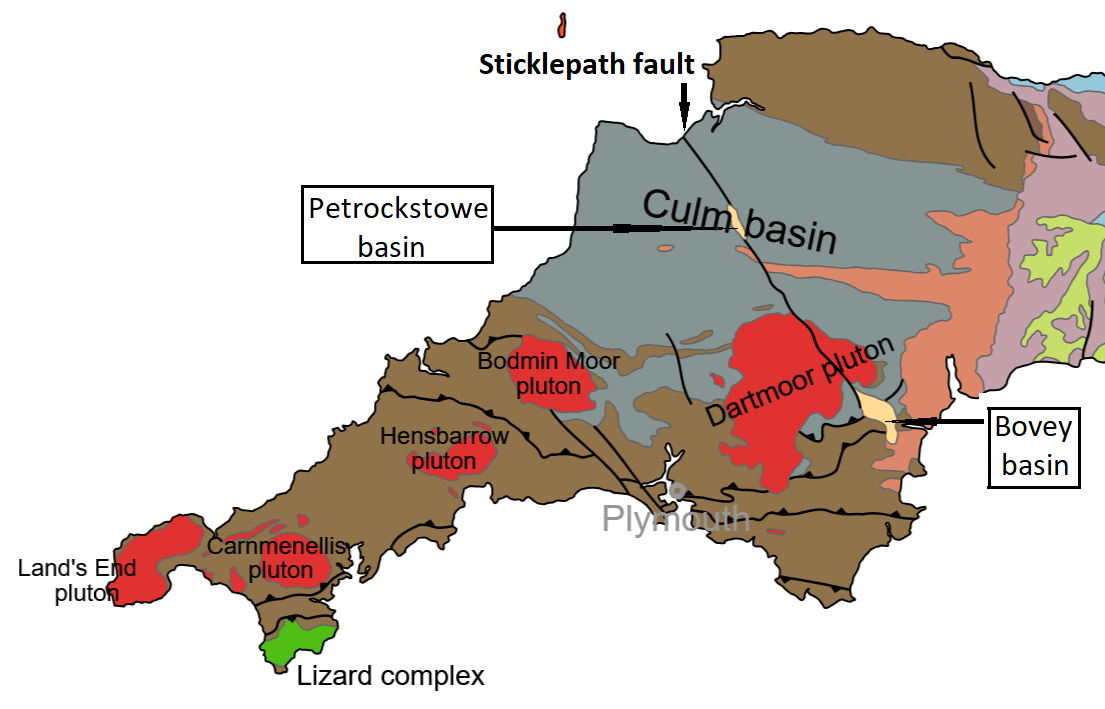
Outline geology SW England showing location of Bovey and Petrockstowe basins and line of Sticklepath fault

The Sticklepath Fault (or sometimes Sticklepath-Lustleigh Fault) is a strike-slip geological fault which runs northwest – southeast through Devon in southwest England. It is named for the villages of Sticklepath and Lustleigh. The fault zone has been traced seaward in either direction from its landfalls west of Bideford in north Devon and Torbay on the county's southeast coast.

Early movement on the fault was connected with the Variscan orogeny, cumulative offset during that time was as much as 10km, substantial movement also took place during the early Tertiary. The Tertiary movement led to the formation of two sedimentary basins along the line of the fault; at Petrockstowe in mid Devon and Bovey Tracey on the eastern margin of Dartmoor. During the Eocene and Oligocene epochs, around 600m thickness of sediment accumulated in the former and 1200m in the Bovey Basin. Both are interpreted as pull-apart basins which opened as a result of dextral slip on the fault. The Stanley Bank Basin east of Lundy within the Bristol Channel and perhaps also the tiny Flimston Basin in southwest Pembrokeshire, lie on the northwesterly extension of the fault zone.

There are records of minor seismic activity in Cornwall and Devon for the 19th and 20th century but the location of epicentres show no lineation associated with the Sticklepath Fault so there is no indication that the fault has been active in recent times.
