= Sayala, Parbhani =

Village in Maharashtra

Sayala Sayala Khating
- Village
- Country: India
- State: Maharashtra
- District: Parbhani

Government
  - Type: Gram panchayat
- Elevation: 414 m (1,358 ft)

Population (2011)
  - Total: 1,465

Languages
  - Official: Marathi
- Time zone: UTC+5:30 (IST)
- PIN: 431402
- Telephone code: 02452
- Vehicle registration: MH-22

Sayala, commonly known as "Sayala Khating" is a village located in Parbhani Taluka of Parbhani district, in state of Maharashtra.

== Demographics ==
As per 2011 census:

- Sayala Khating has 276 families residing. The village has population of 1465.
- Out of the population of 1465, 752 are males while 713 are females.
- Literacy rate of the village is 75.31%.
- Average sex ratio of Sayala village is 948 females to 1000 males. Average sex ratio of Maharashtra state is 929.

== Geography, and transport ==
Distance between Sayala Khating, and district headquarter Parbhani is 8 kilometres (5.0 mi).
