= Sayala, Palam =

Village in Maharashtra

Sayala
- Village
- Location in Maharashtra Sayala (India)
- Country: India
- State: Maharashtra
- District: Parbhani

Government
  - Type: Gram panchayat
- Elevation: 414 m (1,358 ft)

Population (2011)
  - Total: 1,456

Languages
  - Official: Marathi
- Time zone: UTC+5:30 (IST)
- PIN: 431720
- Telephone code: 02453
- Vehicle registration: MH-22
- Website: parbhani.gov.in

Sayala is a village located in Palam Taluka of Parbhani district, in state of Maharashtra.

== Demographics ==
As per 2011 census:

- Sayala has 286 families residing. The village has population of 1456.
- Out of the population of 1456, 749 are males while 707 are females.
- Literacy rate of the village is 80.22%.
- Average sex ratio of Sayala village is 944 females to 1000 males. Average sex ratio of Maharashtra state is 929.

== Geography, and transport ==
Distance between Sayala, and district headquarter Parbhani is 32 kilometres (20 mi).
