= River Lemon =

River in Devon, England

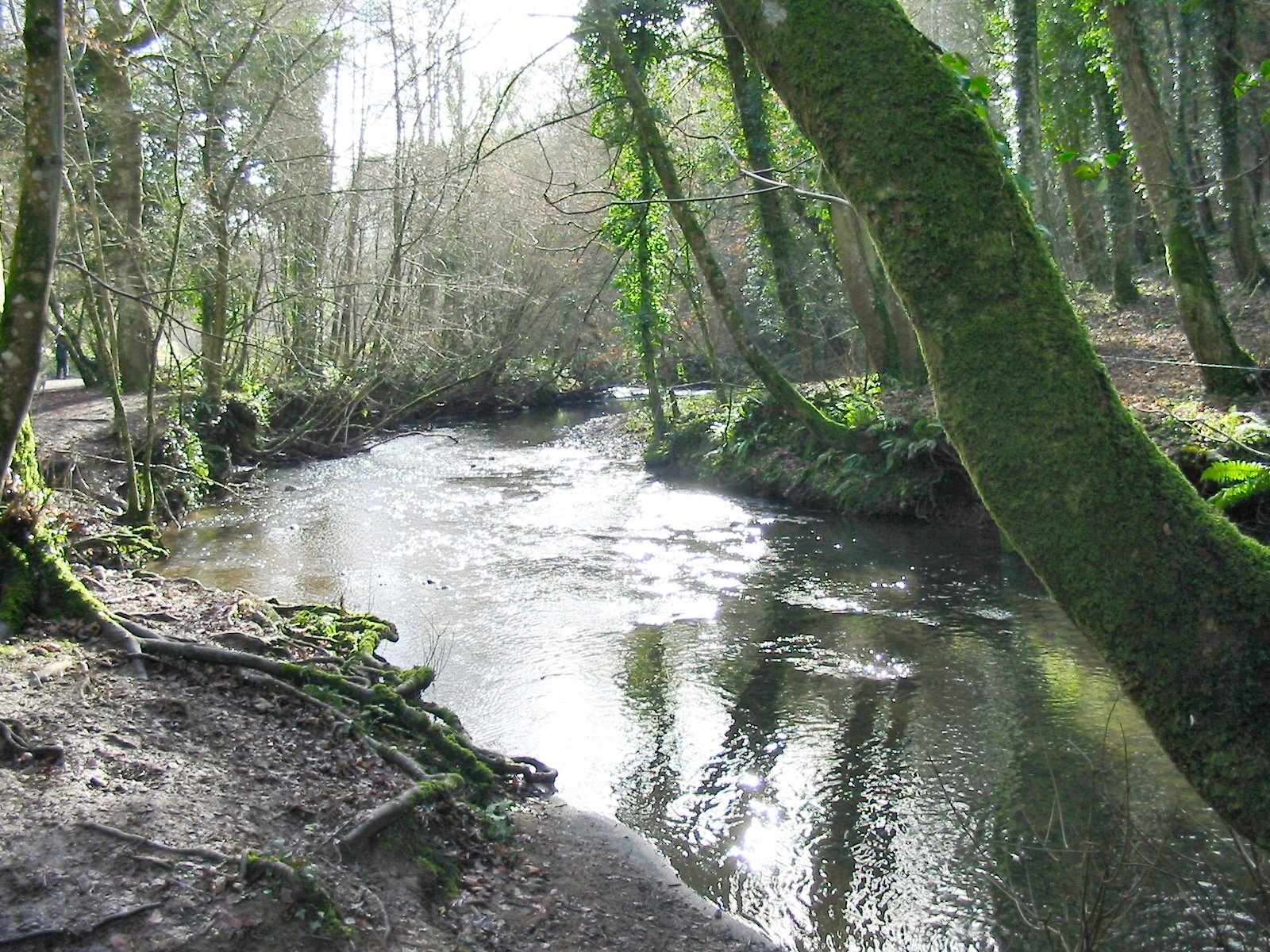
- The River Lemon flowing through Bradley Woods

Physical characteristics
- Source
  - location: Southeast side of Dartmoor, near Haytor
- Length: 9.9 mi (15.9 km)

The River Lemon is a 9.9 miles (15.9 kilometres) river in the county of Devon in southwest England. It is a tributary of the River Teign, starting on Dartmoor by Haytor, and ending in Newton Abbot. It rises on the south-east side of Dartmoor near Haytor, joins with the River Sig and the Langworthy Brook at Sigford, then passes the village of Bickington. Lower down, it is joined by the Kestor Brook and it then flows through the woods in Bradley Valley, past the manor house of Bradley, and through the town of Newton Abbot where it flows through a 440-yard-long (400 m) tunnel below the town centre. Just below the town, the river joins the River Teign at 50.517°N 3.607°W, near the head of its estuary.

A considerable length of the River is designated as a Special Area of Conservation - The South Hams SAC for the Greater Horseshoe Bat, as protected flight corridors (this area extends 500 m each side of the River).

The name Lemon is a derivative of a Celtic word meaning elm.

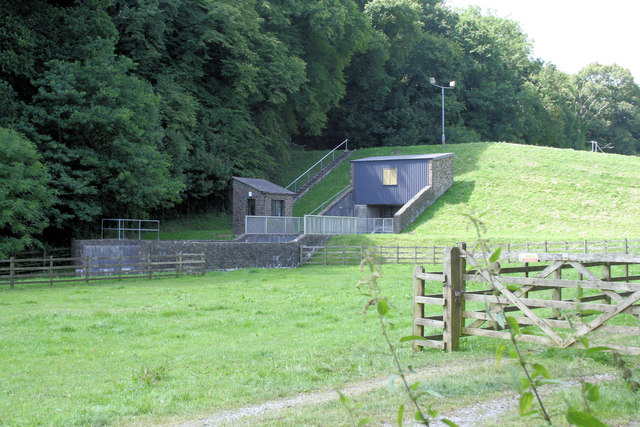
Holbeam Dam

== Floods ==
The river has several times caused major flooding in Newton Abbot, most notably on 19 December 1853, 14 November 1894, 6 August 1938, and 27 December 1979. To prevent further occurrences, a flood-control reservoir and dam were built in 1982, just below the confluence with the Kestor Brook at Holbeam.

In December 2013, Nick Mutton, a local primary school teacher, died while trying to rescue his dog from the river. He was dragged from where he fell in to near Tucker's Maltings, on the other side of the town. The river was high due to torrential rain, causing the River Lemon to overflow.

== Industrial use ==
During its operation from 1898 to 1974, the Newton Abbot power station discharged its used cooling water into the Lemon, having extracted it from the River Teign.

== See also ==
- Puritan's Pit, located in the valley of the River Lemon, and notable as a place of worship for Nonconformists in the 17th century
- River Lemon Valley Woods
