= Kingsteignton =

Town in Devon, England

Coordinates: 50.5458°N 3.5962°W

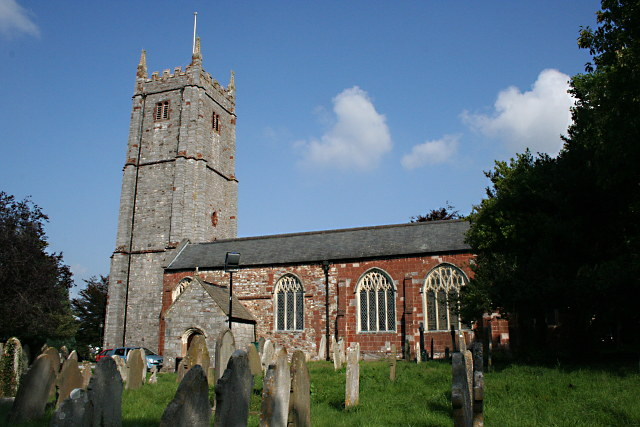
- St. Michael's church

- Location within Devon
- Population: 11,589 (2021 UK Census)
- District: Teignbridge
- Shire county: Devon
- Region: South West
- Country: England
- Sovereign state: United Kingdom
- Post town: NEWTON ABBOT
- Postcode district: TQ12
- Dialling code: 01626
- Police: Devon and Cornwall
- Fire: Devon and Somerset
- Ambulance: South Western
- UK Parliament: Teignbridge

Kingsteignton (/kɪŋˈsteɪntən/ king-STAYN-tən), is a town and civil parish in south Devon, England. It lies at the head of the Teign Estuary to the west of Teignmouth in the Teignbridge district. It is bypassed by the A380 and is also on the A383, A381, B3193 and B3195. Kingsteignton is currently represented in Parliament by Martin Wrigley, as part of the Newton Abbot constituency. Local schools include: Rydon Primary School, Teign School, Kingsteignton school and Saint Michael's Church of England School.

Kingsteignton has a population of over 11,000. The threat of being incorporated into the nearby town of Newton Abbot prompted the parish council to change Kingsteignton's status to a town. The change took effect from 1 January 2009. The town has two electoral wards (east and west). Their combined populations at the 2011 census was 11,147.

== History ==
Founded in the early 8th century by the kings of Wessex as the centre of a vast Saxon estate that extended from Teignmouth to Manaton, Kingsteignton was a key settlement in Saxon times and gave its name to the Saxon hundred of Teignton. The hundred moot or court was held in the village, but it appears that by the time of the Domesday Survey the name of the hundred had been changed to Teignbridge, possibly indicating that the site of the court had been moved. As a royal vill Kingsteignton provided rich pickings for Danish raiders who plundered it in 1001.

Medieval prosperity funded the rebuilding of the parish church (St Michaels) in the 15th century. Its 85-foot (26 metre) tower was built in the 1480s. From the medieval period to the mid-19th century the parish church held an important position as the mother church of Highweek and Newton Bushell.

The Fairwater Leat, fed by the springs at Rydon, superseded the Honeywell Spring as the established water supply in the Middle Ages and also supplied the power for three mills. A drought is said to have given rise to the annual Ram Roasting fair. According to legend there was insufficient water to baptise a child, so a ram was sacrificed to the gods of the local spring. Water sprang forth and a ram has been roasted ever since at the fair, held nowadays on the late May bank holiday. Whit Tuesday was the traditional day for the fair, but it was switched to Whit Monday in the early 1950s to fit in with school holidays. The later switch to the late May bank holiday was made for the same reason when the bank holiday was fixed as the last Monday in May.

Until the 13th century the Manor of Kingsteignton was a crown demesne. In 1509 the manor passed to the Clifford family, who still hold the title of Lord of the manor today.

== Education ==
The local secondary school is Teign School, which also includes a 6th form college.

Primary schools are St Michaels, Rydon and Kingsteignton.

== Transport ==
The main bus operator in the area is Stagecoach South West, which runs a network of regular services to Exeter, Teignmouth, Dawlish and Totnes. County Bus (Newton Abbot) is a local independent operator that runs services to Brixham, Paignton, Torquay and Torbay Hospital.

Kingsteignton is served by Newton Abbot railway station, which lies on the Exeter-Plymouth line. Great Western Railway operates local services Exmouth, Exeter St Davids, Dawlish, Teignmouth and Paignton; it also provides inter-city services to London Paddington, Reading, Plymouth and Penzance.

The area was once served by the Moretonhampstead branch and the Teign Valley line.

The town is near the A380 dual carriageway, which links Exeter, Dawlish, Teignmouth and Newton Abbot.

== Geology and quarrying ==
Fine quality ball clay beds created some 40–30 million years ago during the Oligocene Period lie on the eastern edge of the Bovey Basin near Kingsteignton. The exploitation of these clays began in the late 17th century when it was discovered that their properties made them eminently suitable for pipe making. Their white firing properties attracted interest from potters looking for materials to improve their wares, and their exploitation was boosted in 1791 when Josiah Wedgwood first purchased Kingsteignton clay. Over the past 200 years clay mining has brought continued employment and prosperity to Kingsteignton.

Limestone has been extensively quarried at various times on either side of Golvers Hill at Rydon, Coombesend and Gildons. Kingsteignton Quarry at Rydon (now infilled) supplied stone for the building of Buckfast Abbey. Numerous limekilns, some still in existence, were found along the dry valley that extends from Rydon to Lindridge and along the Coombesend valley. The kiln at Kiln Forehead was demolished during the extension of Calvados Park, whilst the kiln beside Rydon school was partly demolished and buried under an earth bank when the lane to Rydon Quarry was widened.

Sand and gravel has also been extensively quarried at Babcombe Copse, Sands Copse and Heathfield, the latter becoming a large landfill site. Lysons' Magna Britannia mentions that the ancient Britons extracted alluvial tin from the gravels deposited by the river Teign.

== Historic estates ==
The parish of Kingsteignton includes various historic estates including:

- Whiteway, a Domesday Book manor and later a seat of the Yard family, today a farmhouse known as Whiteway Barton.

== Sport and leisure ==
Newton Abbot RFC (established 1873) are based in Kingsteignton, playing home games at Rackerhayes. Kingsteignton AFC, known as the Rams, play at Broadpark and compete in the South Devon Football League.

== Notable people ==
- Ralph Venning (c. 1621–1673 or 1674), an English nonconformist Christian.
- Theophilus Gale (1628–1678), an English educationalist, nonconformist and theologian of dissent.
- Phil Joslin (1916–1980), football goalkeeper who played 243 games, including 135 for Torquay United
- Ryan Law (born 1999), footballer who has played over 150 games including 75 for Truro City
