= Phil Joslin (footballer) =

English footballer

Personal information
- Full name: Philip James Joslin
- Date of birth: 1 September 1916
- Place of birth: Kingsteignton, England
- Date of death: 31 January 1980 (aged 63)
- Height: 5 ft 9 in (1.75 m)
- Position: Goalkeeper

Senior career*
Years	Team	Apps	(Gls)
1935–1948	Torquay United	135	(0)
1948–1951	Cardiff City	108	(0)
Total		243	(0)
- * Club domestic league appearances and goals

Philip James Joslin (1 September 1916 – 31 January 1980) was an English professional footballer who played as a goalkeeper. He made over 200 appearances in the Football League for Torquay United and Cardiff City before his career was ended in 1951 due to injury.

== Career ==
Born in Kingsteignton, as a youngster Joslin was rejected by Plymouth Argyle after a trial and instead joined Torquay United in 1936 and was the first choice goalkeeper at the club up until the outbreak of World War II. During the war he served with the Royal Army Service Corps and often played for his division as a centre forward. During the war he also guested for London sides Arsenal, Fulham and Tottenham Hotpsur.

He returned to Torquay following the end of the war before signing for Cardiff City, who had first refusal on Torquay players at the time, in 1948 and kept fifteen clean sheets in thirty-eight league appearances in his first season. He remained the club's first choice for a further two seasons before his career was ended by injury in August 1951. Whilst playing in a pre-season public practice match for the club, he collided with centre-forward Wilf Grant, breaking his leg. Joslin never fully recovered from the injury and did not play professional football again.
