= Puritan's Pit =

Pit in Devon, England

Puritan's Pit Preacher's Pit, The Devil's Pit, Gruti's Pit
- Sinkhole
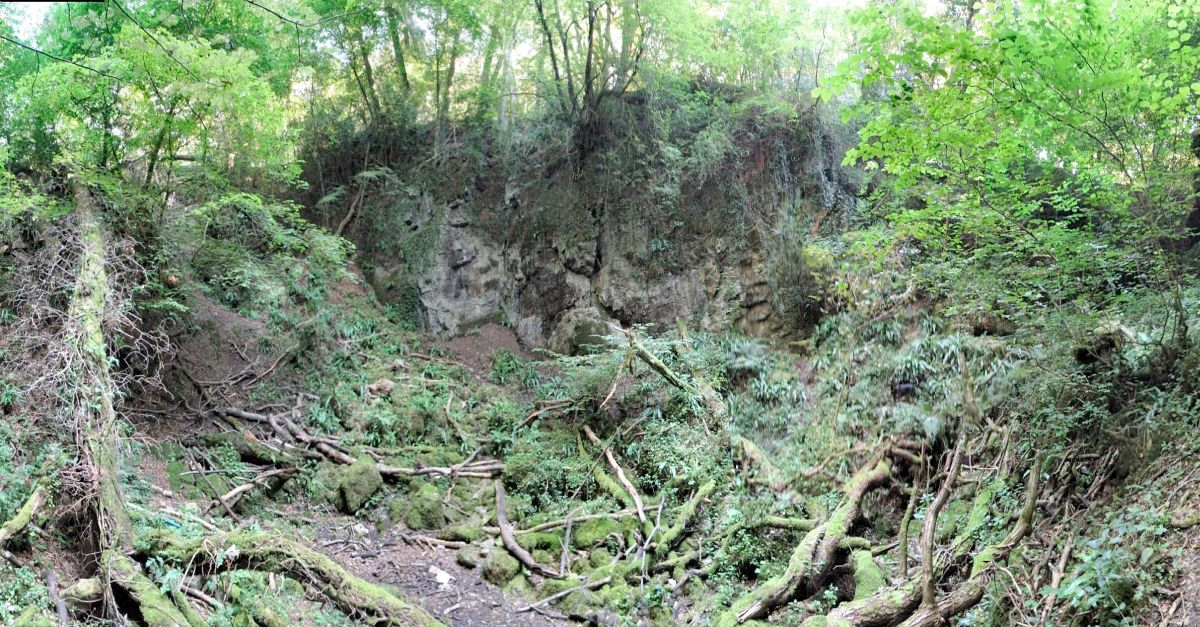
- Part of Puritan's Pit

- Location within Devon
- Coordinates: 50°31′35.8″N 3°37′55.2″W
- Location: Newton Abbot
- Geology: Limestone

Puritan's Pit (also known as Preacher's Pit, The Devil's Pit or Gruti's Pit) is a large steep-sided pit in the south side of the valley of the River Lemon in Bradley Woods, just west of the town of Newton Abbot in Devon, England. It is probably a collapsed limestone cavern and although it is about 12 metres deep and some 50 metres across at its widest, it is invisible from the river and the main path on the other side.

== History ==
Puritan's Pit owes its notability to Willam Yeo, a Presbyterian clergyman who was installed as Rector of Wolborough in 1648 by Oliver Cromwell. Yeo was reportedly very assiduous in his duties and would walk around the town after Sunday service with a constable, to ensure that the sabbath was kept holy. After 14 years, however, he was deprived of his living for refusing to acknowledge the post-Restoration Act of Uniformity.

In the years that followed, Yeo and his supporters met in Puritan's Pit by night to worship. At this time he was effectively an outlaw as can be seen from an order of sessions that was made in 1683 offering a reward of 40 shillings to anyone who apprehended a dissenting minister. The Act of Toleration 1689 brought this episode to a close, and Yeo's house was certified to be used as a place of worship.

Today, the pit can be accessed via a steep path on the south side of the river. The bottom of the pit is covered with large limestone boulders and the remains of trees that have fallen in.
