= Cecil Mallaby Firth =

British Egyptologist

Cecil Mallaby Firth (5 July 1878 – 1931) was a British Egyptologist.

Cecil Firth surrounded by cat coffins and bronzes

Firth was baptised at Ashburton in Devon on 14 August 1878, the son of Henry Mallaby Firth, gent., and Frances (Fanny) Caunter. He became a lawyer, and after briefly working in Cyprus left to join the Service des Antiquités in Egypt, an organisation run by French scholars to prevent the illicit trade in Egyptian artifacts. Firth worked on the first archaeological survey of Nubia of 1907 to 1911. In 1912 he set up the Aswan Museum. He became the inspector of antiquities at Saqqara and began to explore the complex of Djoser's Step Pyramid in Saqqara where, in 1924, he discovered the serdab of the pharaoh, which is now in the Egyptian Museum in Cairo.

Firth then worked in collaboration with James E. Quibell and subsequently with Jean-Philippe Lauer on his arrival on the site in 1926.

In 1928 and 1929, Firth began the opening of the funerary complex of Userkaf, the first king of the 5th dynasty, and that of a small pyramid located just at the south, allotted to his queen. In early 1930 he worked on the Headless Pyramid, believing it to be a pyramid of a king of the First Intermediate Period. It is now understood that the pyramid belongs to Menkauhor Kaiu of the Fifth Dynasty.

Firth's wife was Winifred (Freda) Nest Firth (née Hansard, 1871–1937), a painter and copyist.

== Death ==
In 1931 Firth worked on clearance of the archaic tombs of Saqqara but contracted pneumonia whilst on leave in England, resulting in his untimely death.

== Selected publications ==
- The archæological survey of Nubia. Report for 1907-1908. 1910.
- The archaeological survey of Nubia : report for 1908-1909. 1912.
- The archaeological survey of Nubia. Report for 1909-1910. 1915.
- with Battiscombe Gunn: Excavations at Saqqara; Teti pyramid cemeteries. 1926.
