= Bovey Formation =

- Stratigraphic range: Eocene–Oligocene
- Type: Geological formation
- Sub-units: Lappathorn Member, Abbrook Clay and Sand Member, Southacre Clay And Lignite Member
- Underlies: Alluvium
- Overlies: Aller Gravel Formation
- Thickness: up to 1,200 metres (3,940 ft)

Lithology
- Primary: Clay, Lignite, Sand

Location
- Region: Europe
- Country: UK
- Extent: Devon

The Bovey Formation is a deposit of sands, clays and lignite, probably over 1000 feet thick. It lies in a sedimentary basin termed the Bovey Basin which extends from Bovey Tracey to Newton Abbot in South Devon, England. The Bovey Basin lies along the line of the Sticklepath Fault and owes its existence to subsidence along this fault. A smaller basin with similar deposits lies further northeast along the fault at Petrockstowe.

The deposit is the result of the degradation of the neighbouring Dartmoor granite; it was laid down in river flood plains and lakes during the late Eocene and Oligocene epochs. Most of the fossilised plant material in the lignite is from Sequoia couttsiae.

The Bovey Formation is the major source in England for ball clay – a highly plastic fine-grained kaolinitic sedimentary clay typically used by the pottery industry. Large excavations have been made for the extraction of these clays. In the past, the lignite or "Bovey Coal" was burned in local kilns; steam engines; and workmen's cottages. It was, however, not economical.
