= Ball clay =

Kaolinitic sedimentary clay

Ball clays are kaolinitic sedimentary clays that commonly consist of 20–80% kaolinite, 10–25% mica and 6–65% quartz, along with small amounts of organic matter (such as lignite) and trace amounts of other minerals such as pyrite and siderite.

They are a common raw material for various types of ceramics, where their primary roles are to impart unfired strength, plasticity or to aid rheological stability during the shaping processes. Most ball clays impart colours ranging from buff to cream to off-white when fired in an oxidising atmosphere.

The name "ball clay" is derived from the form of the extracted material when dug by spade as cubes, which then became rounded during subsequent transport, in Dorset and Devon, England during the early days of the industry during the 18th century.

In 2008, UK production of ball clay was reported to be worth £82 million, with sanitaryware manufacturers being the largest single group of end users, representing 40% by volume.

== Locations ==
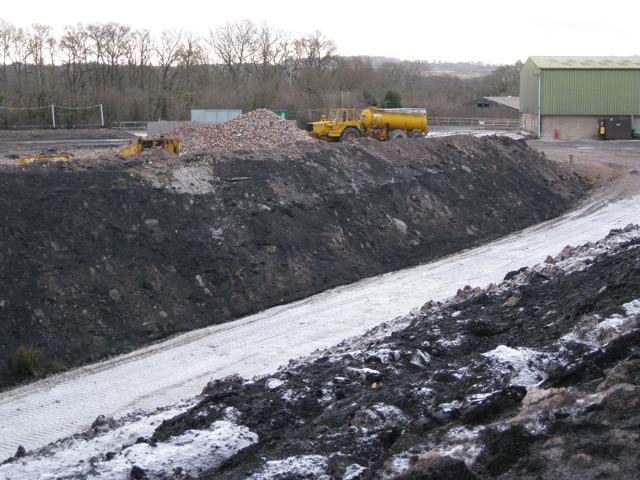
A ball clay mine in the UK

Deposits are relatively scarce due to the combination of geological factors needed for their formation and preservation. Commercial extraction of ball clays is undertaken across the world, including:

- Argentina (San Julian area of Patagonia)
- Brazil (various locations including the region around São Paulo – São Simão, Suzano and Ribeirão Pire)
- China (various including Guangdong Province)
- Czech Republic (Cheb, Plzeň, Prague, Most, S. Bohemia and W. Moravia)
- Germany (various locations but the main is the Westerwald region)
- Indonesia (various locations including the island of Kalimantan)
- Thailand (Lampang)
- United Kingdom (the Bovey Basin of south Devon, the Petrockstow Basin in north Devon and the area around Wareham in south-east Dorset)
- USA (Kentucky, Tennessee and Texas)

== Production output ==
Global production of ball clay by country for 2002–2003 was estimated to be:

Country	1,000 tonnes
South Africa	10
Africa – total	10
China	2,000
Malaysia	600
Indonesia	500
Thailand	300
Vietnam	200
India	150
Asia – total	3,750
Ukraine	3,500
Germany	3,000
Spain	1,200
United Kingdom	1,000
Turkey	550
Czech Republic	400
France	400
Italy	100
Poland	50
Europe – total	10,200
United States	1,200
North America – total	1,200
Australia	80
Oceania – total	80
Brazil	250
Argentia	50
Chile	5
South America – total	350
Global – total	15,385

== Typical properties ==
Some selected typical properties of various UK ball clays are:

Product name	Hycast Rapide	Sanblend 75 Slurry	Prestige BLU	Prestige TA	Hyplas 71	Hymod Excelsior	Hymod Blue
Source	Bovey	Bovey	Bovey	Petrockstow	Petrockstow	Wareham	Warehan
Producing company	Imerys	WBB	WBB	WBB	Imerys	Imerys	Imerys
Residue, wt% <125 μm	2.0	0.1	0.2	0.5	1.0	0.3	0.1
% <2 μm	70	78	82	77	57	92	89
% <1 μm	60	65	-	-	50	87	79
% <0.5 μm	45	-	-	-	40	80	65
SiO_{2}, %	55.0	53.7	54.0	60.5	69.0	49.0	53.0
Al_{2}O_{3}, %	29.0	28.9	31.2	25.8	20.0	35.0	31.0
Fe_{2}O_{3}, %	1.1	1.2	1.0	1.9	0.9	1.6	1.4
TiO_{2}, %	1.1	1.1	1.2	1.5	1.7	1.3	1.0
CaO, %	0.2	-	-	-	0.1	0.3	0.3
MgO, %	0.3	-	-	-	0.4	0.3	0.5
K_{2}O, %	1.6	2.5	3.0	2.9	1.9	1.2	3.2
Na_{2}O, %	0.2	-	-	-	0.4	0.2	0.4
Carbon, %	2.0	2.5	0.2	0.6	0.1	0.3	0.4
LOI, %	12.0	12.0	9.0	8.0	5.4	12.0	9.2

== History in the UK ==
The ceramic use of ball clays in Britain dates back to at least the Roman era. More recent trade began when a clay was needed to make tobacco pipes in the 16th and 17th century. In 1771 Josiah Wedgwood signed a contract for 1,400 tons a year of ball clay with Thomas Hyde of Purbeck, enabling the production of thinner-walled ceramics.

== See also ==
- Newton Abbot § Ball clay and the Stover Canal
- Purbeck Ball Clay
