= Lustleigh Show =

The Lustleigh Show
- Status: Ongoing
- Locations: Lustleigh, Devon
- Inaugurated: 1887
- Participants: 4,000 - 5,000
- Website: thelustleighshow.com

The Lustleigh Show is an annual country show held in the village of Lustleigh, Devon, England. The show takes place on the August Bank Holiday Monday every year, and has been running since 1887. The show typically attracts upwards of 4,000 visitors, to a village with a population under 700. The show features traditional country fete activities including a horticultural show, dog show, bowling for a pig, and displays in the main ring.

== History ==
The first record of the show is in 1887, named as the Lustleigh Cottage Garden Show, and featuring a horticultural exhibition and contest, as well as a fête organised in conjunction with the Rational Sick and Burial Association. The first show had a 100 feet (30 m) long marquee in the field adjacent to the railway station and cricket field. The Bovey Tracey Brass Band played, including a procession from the field to the church for a service. Prizes to the value of £20 were offered for winners in the horticultural show.

By 1889, sports competitions had been added to the programme, with prizes to the value of £5 advertised.

In 1900, the show suffered its first 'wash out', with stormy weather causing the collapse of the horticultural tent, killing several of the chickens on display but the following year in 1901, the show reported over 500 exhibits being entered in the horticultural show. The destruction of the tent was written about by local diarist Cecil Torr in his Small Talk at Wreyland, who also noted that there were rabbits on display.

By 1912, the show also noted the inclusion of maypole dancing alongside sports such as hurdles, high jump, long jump, potato picking, bowling for a pig and tilting the bucket.

The show moved to the fields at Kelly Farm in 1947, during which year over 921 people attended the show, despite heavy rainfall on the previous day requiring drainage works to the field entrance. This show also notes the presence of a well supported gymkhana.

The 1948 show was titled as the "second annual flower show and gymkhana" and ran alongside a goat show organised by the South-Western Counties Goat Society. The goat show was a fixture over several decades, including through the 1950s, 1960s, 1970s, 1980s, and 1990s, with the last mention being in 1995.

When the August Bank Holiday Monday was moved from the start to the end of August by Edward Heath in 1965, the show moved with it, and stayed on the bank holiday Monday.

== Show schedule ==
As well as the foundational horticultural exhibition, the show currently has a range of attractions, including traditional fairground games, music, sheaf tossing, and a dog show.

Displays in the main ring change annually, but include activities such as falconry, stunt shows, heavy horses, and children's races.

The show has had flypast displays by the Red Arrows and Battle of Britain Memorial Flight.

=== Lustleigh 10k ===
The show also hosts the Lustleigh 10k run, which is a challenging multi-terrain run over a 10 kilometres (6.2 mi) course around the village, starting and finishing in the show field.

== Organisation ==
The Lustleigh horticultural society organised the show until 1990, when it was taken over by a dedicated committee.

Surplus funds raised from the show are spent in the village on numerous community projects and good causes. Thus far more than £15,000 has been reinvested in the village.
