= Lustleigh =

Village in Devon, England

Coordinates: 50°37′05″N 3°43′10″W

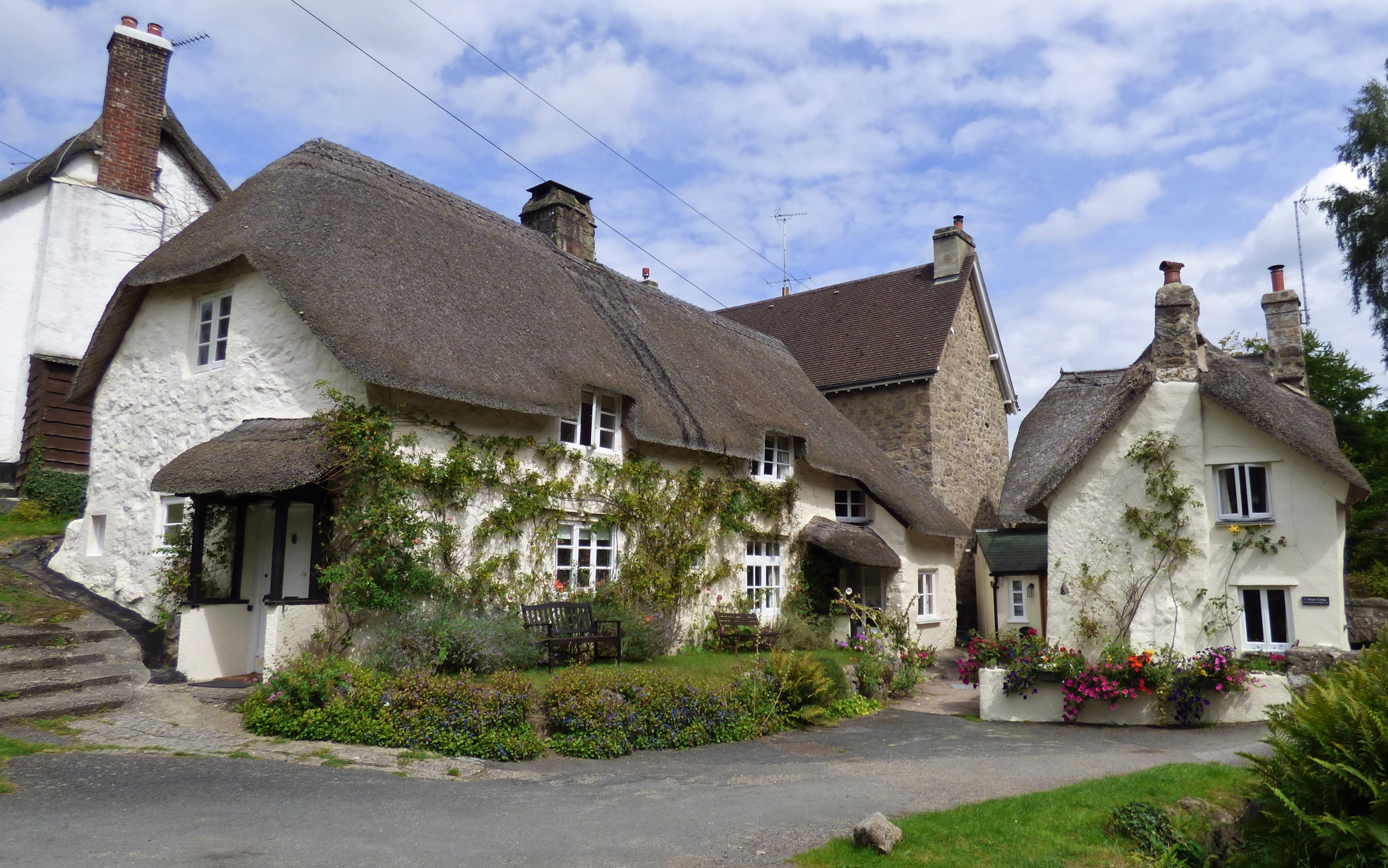
- Thatched cottages in Lustleigh

- Location within Devon
- Population: 600
- OS grid reference: SX784812
- District: Teignbridge
- Shire county: Devon
- Region: South West
- Country: England
- Sovereign state: United Kingdom
- Post town: NEWTON ABBOT
- Postcode district: TQ13
- Dialling code: 01647
- Police: Devon and Cornwall
- Fire: Devon and Somerset
- Ambulance: South Western
- UK Parliament: Central Devon

Lustleigh is a small village and civil parish in the Wray Valley, inside the Dartmoor National Park in Devon, England. It is between the towns of Bovey Tracey and Moretonhampstead. The village has often been named in various publications as being amongst the best or prettiest villages in the country, particularly due to the traditional thatched buildings in the village centre, and local activities such as the Lustleigh Show. That has also led to it being noted as the most expensive rural location in which to buy a house.

The village is clustered around the parish church of St John the Baptist. Surrounding this are old buildings, many of which have thatched roofs. There is a village shop with Post Office, auto mechanic, tea room and a pub.

== Toponymy ==
Legh or leigh is Old English for a clearing in a wood. The oldest recorded use of the name is as Leuesterlegh in 1242, from the Book of Fees, and it is thought that the first part of the name represents the name of a person. This person has been suggested to be either Luvesta ('dearest one' in Middle English) which is a surname known from Ermington in 1333, or Lēofgiest, an old English name, making it "Luvesta's clearing" or "Lēofgiest's clearing".

The spelling of the name has continued to drift, and other spellings have included Leuesteleḡ (in 1249), Leuistelegh (1276), Luuestelegh (1276), Lustelegh (1276), Luuastelegge (1282), Lusteleye (1285), Lisleigh (1672), and Luſtley (1761).

The hamlet of Caseley within Lustleigh parish has been spelled in various differing forms over the centuries such as Carswillegh, Carslegh, or Carnysleghe. It is believed to derive from the Old English words "cærse" (watercress) and "lēah" (a clearing or meadow) meaning the clearing where watercress grows. Etymologists and family historians believe Caseley to be the origin of the Devonshire family surname 'Causley' and its variants such as Caseley and Casley.

== Settlement geography ==
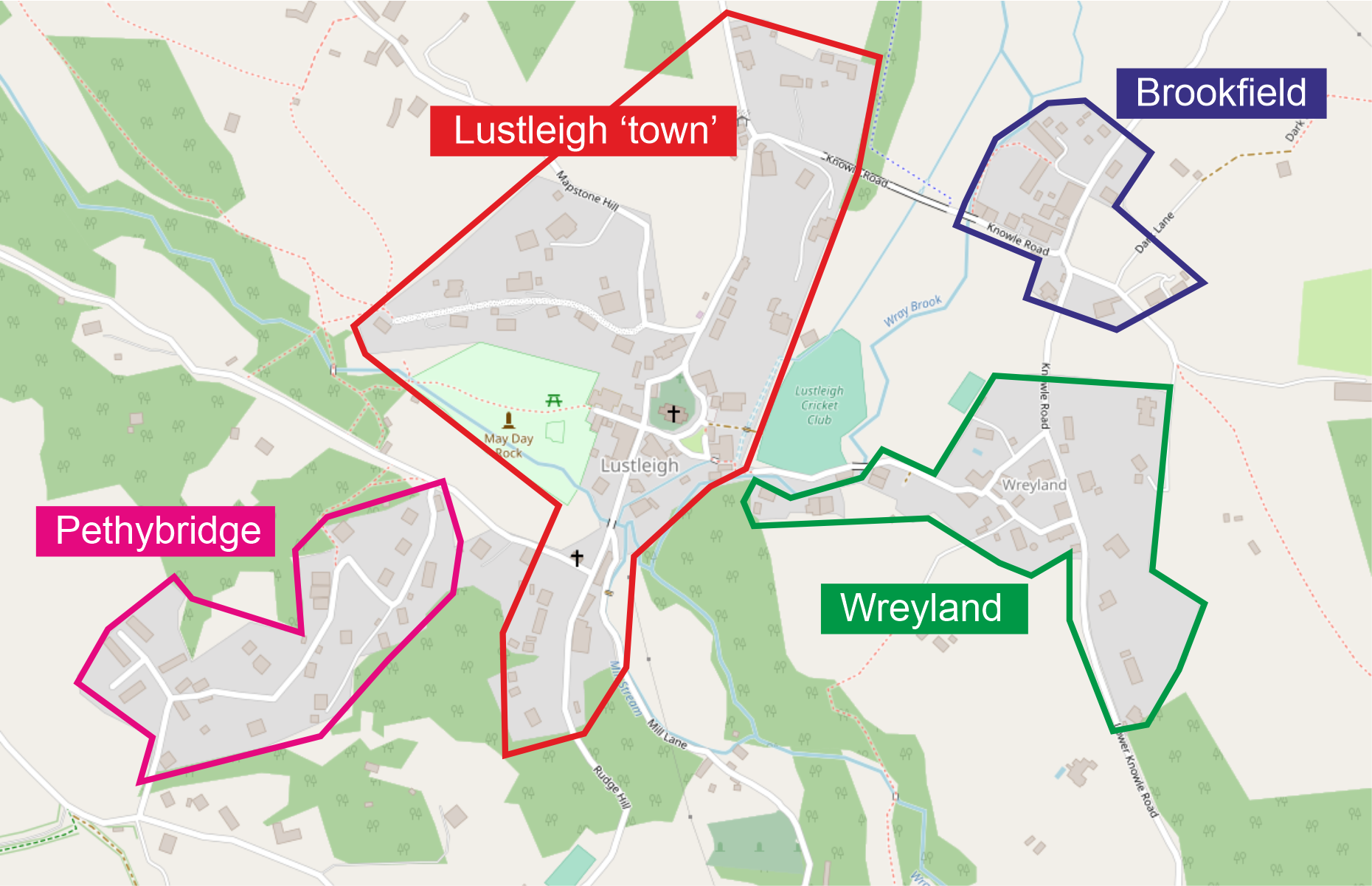
Annotated map showing the discrete hamlets making up the polyfocal village of Lustleigh. This shows the nucleated centre of Lustleigh 'town' and the contiguous but formerly separate hamlets of Wreyland, Brookfield, and Pethybridge.

The settlement geography of the modern village is that there is a distinct nucleated village centre, sometimes referred to as the "town", with a large cluster of buildings and facilities around the central churchyard. However, for historical reasons, the centre of the village is polyfocal, with separate distinct hamlets, now partially merged into the centre.

Until 1929, the parish boundary with the Bovey Tracey civil parish was set at the Wray Brook, which runs in the valley bottom, which meant that the manor of Wreyland was part of Bovey parish, despite its proximity to the centre of Lustleigh. The same applies to the Brookfield houses which form a distinct area on the approach to the village, and which were built in the last 19th century for the miners of Kelly Mine.

Pethybridge was once a relatively isolated farmstead, prior to its purchase by the council in 1945, and the building of council housing, which was officially opened in 1949.

The hamlets of Pethybridge, Wreyland, and Brookfield are nearly contiguous with the centre of the village, but the further hamlets of Hammerslake and Sanduck are further from the village centre. The remainder of the parish is a dispersed settlement, with houses and farms spread out in their own grounds.

== History of the village ==
=== Prehistory ===
The area where Lustleigh now stands has been inhabited since before records began as shown by the remains of stone hut circles, evidence of Stone Age activity, and the presence of an ancient burial monument "Datuidoc's Stone", which dates from between 450 and 600 AD, and is housed within the village church, having previously been the door sill.

=== Early history ===
There is some disagreement amongst scholars about the early identity of the village, and whether it appears in historical record. Some indicate that the village was recorded as Suðeswyrðe in the 899 will of King Alfred the Great, being left to his youngest son Æthelweard. This was later recorded in the Domesday Book of 1086 as Sutreworde, Anglo-Saxon for 'south of the wood'.

Other scholars, including noted antiquarian and Lustleigh resident Cecil Torr, dispute that interpretation, and believe that Suðeswyrðe and Sutreworde refer to other settlements. Torr asserts that the settlement mentioned has features much larger than Lustleigh has ever been, and that the main evidence supporting the assertion is incomplete matching of records from the Marshwood estates.

Later scholarship by historian Ian Mortimer has suggested that Sutreworde was in Lustleigh parish, not at the current location of the village, but rather near the Iron Age hill fort at Hunter's Tor in Lustleigh Cleave on the edge of the parish. At the time of the Domesday Survey, there were around 155 people living in Sutreworde.

If that is the case, then the current village was still part of the manor, within the Teignbridge Hundred, and was controlled by Ansgar the Staller as part of a 1,200-acre (490-hectare) farm holding, plus a large area of forest. Unusually for the Domesday Book, beekeeping was mentioned as a key activity of the parish.

=== Middle ages ===
During the reign of Henry I, the parish was held by Geoffrey de Mandeville who was warden of Exeter Castle, and who was also given the Wonford Hundred in Exeter. de Mandelville's descendant William Tilly was attainted by King John and forfeited the property, before Robert de Mandeville was able to recover the lands to the family.

In 1272, during the reign of Edward I, Lustleigh passed to William de Widworthy of Widworthy, a family of knights from the Colyton Hundred. It remained in this family until 1413, when it was purchased by Sir John Wadham, a Justice of the Common Pleas, in whose family it remained for eight generations until the death of heir Nicholas Wadham who had no children and endowed the money from the sale of two-thirds of the Lustleigh estate to the construction of Wadham College, Oxford.

The oldest known house in the village is the old manor house on Mapstone Hill, now divided into three properties, with the oldest part dated to the 14th century. It is thought to have been built by William Prouz, heir to Gidleigh Castle and used to replace former manorial court at Barnecourt. Prouz is believed to have added the south chapel to the Church of St John the Baptist, near to the manor house in Lustleigh and there is an effigy of him within the church where he is also buried.

The remainder of the estate manor, and particularly the houses of Uphill and Great Hall on Mapstone Hill, was in the hands of heirs of the Wadhams, the Earls of Ilchester, until the beginning of the 19th century, when it was broken up and sold off.

=== Boundary expansions ===
Over time, the village expanded from its original boundaries (signified by the Bishop's stone at Caseley as the entrance, and the Wray or Wrey brook in the valley). The major expansion was the annexation of Wreyland and Brookfield to the parish, which was completed by an Order in Council in 1929.

This order expanded the boundary to Wilford Bridge on the River Bovey and took the extent out to Slade Cross on the A382 road, where previously beating the bounds from neighbouring Bovey Tracey had come right to Lustleigh railway station, which was adjacent to the Wray Brook on the boundary.

== Awards and features ==
The village has often been named amongst the 'best' villages in the country, by a range of publications. This includes:

- "one of the prettiest villages in the UK" - MyLondon
- "one of England's greatest villages" - Daily Telegraph
- "Dartmoor's prettiest village" - Britain Express
- "one of Britain's prettiest villages" - Discover Britain

== Populace ==
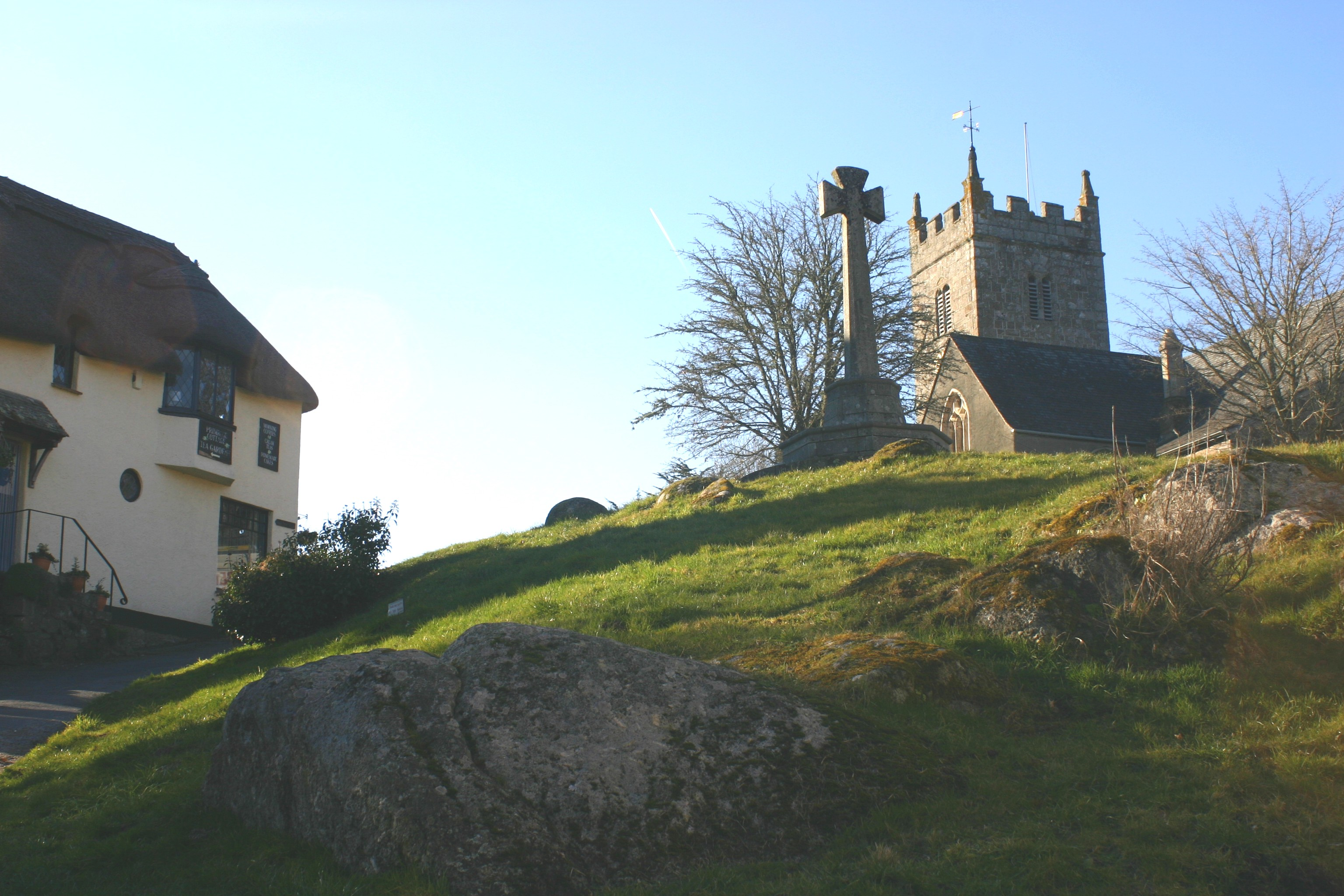
View of Lustleigh Church, the Celtic Cross and Primrose Tea Rooms from Wreyland

The parish has a broadly declining population, down from a high of 679 in 1951, split between 153 households (an average of over 4 people per household), to a 2011 population of 553 across 286 households (an average of less than two people per household), and 579 people in 2021 in 273 households. In the 2021 census, less than 25% of households had more than 2 occupants, and the sexes were nearly evenly split with 297 females and 282 males.

The median age for residents in the wider area (Moretonhampstead, Lustleigh & East Dartmoor - which also included North Bovey and Widecombe) was 55 years old in the 2021 census, and nearly one third of all residents were over 65 (compared to the national average of 11%), whilst only 13.3% were aged 15 years or under (compared to 17.4% nationally).

Over 60% of residents of the parish own their own home outright, without a mortgage, loan, or shared ownership, and around a further 20% have a mortgage, loan, or shared ownership.

In excess of 97.9% of residents of the village identify as white, and over 90% identify as only British (or another UK identity, such as English), with over 92% of residents born in the UK. A little under half of the population has no religion, with around 40% being Christian.

Around half the population are "economically inactive", meaning they are not in work or looking for work, or have retired, and over 80% of those have not worked in the last 12 months. Over half of residents have Level 4 qualifications or above (above A-levels).

== Village features ==
The village is centred around the Church of St John the Baptist, whose graveyard occupies a roughly oval plot. Most of the village's amenities are clustered around this area, including a village shop and outreach post office (The Dairy), an art gallery (Stable House Gallery), a tea rooms (Primrose Tea Rooms), pub & restaurant (The Cleave), and auto mechanic (Orchard Garage).

In 1995, villagers created a subscription company to purchase the shop, which was at risk of closure, raising £86,000 to purchase the freehold, and ensuring that the village continued to have a retail outlet.

The village previously had several other shops, including a stand-alone post office and Royal Mail sorting office which closed in 2009, with post office counter services reopening in the Dairy, as well as a tuck shop in what is now a private house.

Many of the buildings (including the pub, tea rooms, and art gallery) are traditionally thatched, and this is a common feature through the village, especially in the Wreyland (pronounced 'Relland', possibly after an old local family) area. Wreyland was not traditionally part of Lustleigh, sitting on the other side of the Wray Brook, but was incorporated into the village in 1929.

There is a small village green outside the church and tea rooms, featuring a granite cross, erected as a memorial to the Reverend Henry Tudor, rector of the parish, who died in the early 20th century.

A short distance from the centre is the village hall, rebuilt on the site of the former Conservative Club, and featuring a large main hall, a meeting room, and a kitchen, as well as service areas and a rifle range.

Adjacent to the village hall and auto mechanic is the orchard (also known as the Town Orchard), which is around 5 acres (2.0 hectares) of public park land, gifted to the parish in 1965 by a local. The orchard hosts the annual Lustleigh May Day, and there is a large granite rock with carved throne used for crowning of the May Queen.

Further outside the village is 'The Bishop's Stone', which is a carved boundary stone on the bottom of Caseley Hill and the top of the station approach road, carved to commemorate the visit of a Bishop of Exeter, although it is not known which bishop.

On the main A382 road outside the village centre, on the Kelly Farm estate is Kelly Mine, which is a preserved mine, occasionally opened to the public for tours.

The village used to have a county primary school, opened in 1876, but this closed in 1963.

=== Places of worship ===
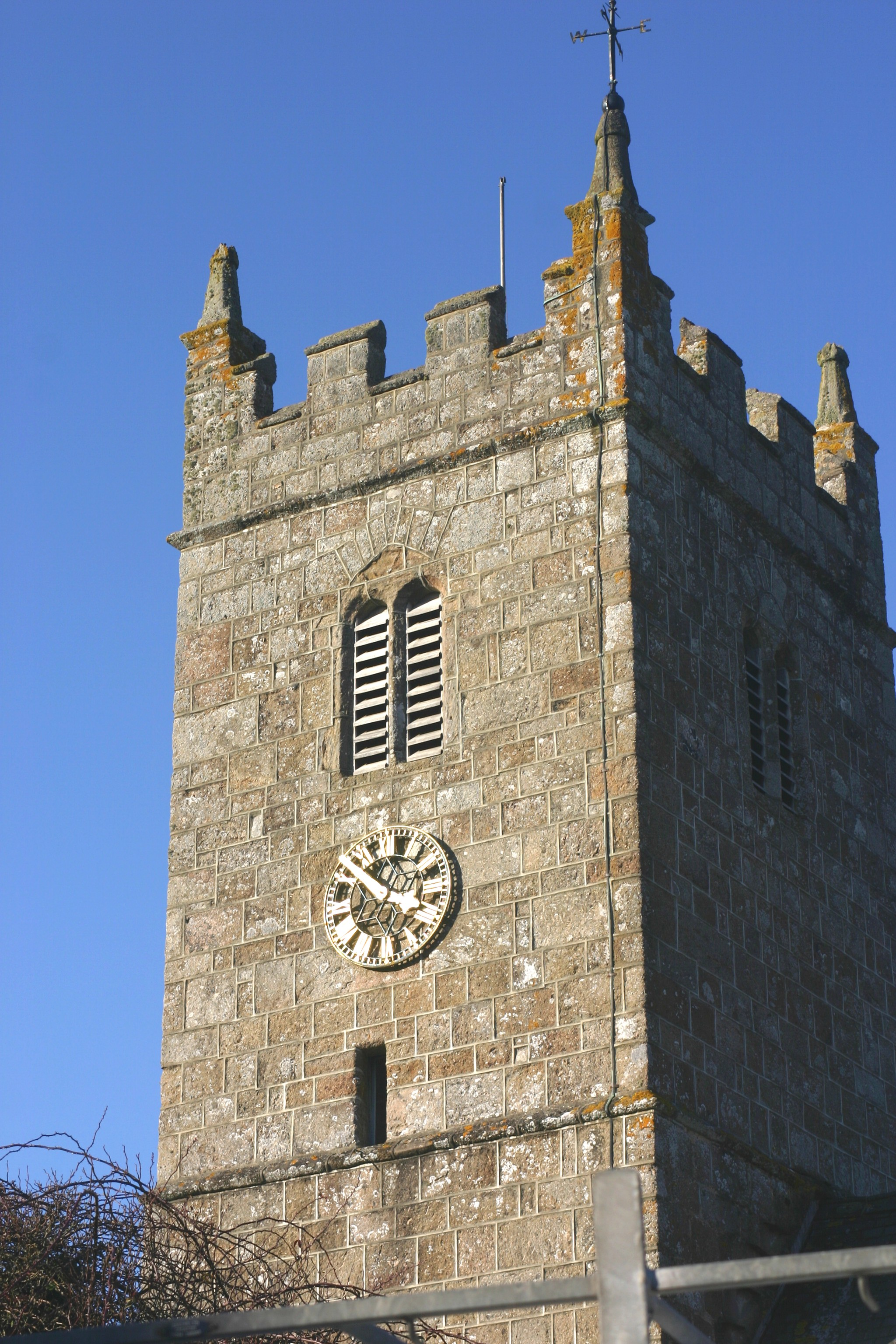
Church tower of St John the Baptist, Lustleigh

Lustleigh currently has the Church of St John the Baptist as the Church of England parish church, located centrally in the village, as well as a Baptist Church just outside the village centre on Rudge Hill, and was built in around 1853 by people of the village, most notably including the large Amery family, who have one of the longest associations with the village.

The parish church contains the ancient Datuidoc's stone, which is a carved stone dating from around 450-600AD.

There was previously had a Gospel Hall of the Plymouth Brethren down the hill from St John's, which was in operation from the early 20th until the early 21st century, and a private Roman Catholic chapel, beside Pixies Cottage on Mapstone Hill.

== Transport ==
Being an outlying rural area, Lustleigh relies heavily on road transport with over 47% of people in the area travelling to work by car or van (and 42.9% working from home) at the 2021 census.

The main route serving Lustleigh is the A382 road from Bovey Tracey and Moretonhampstead, which was built as a turnpike road by the Newton Bushell Turnpike Trust following a petition to parliament by a consortium of parishes including Lustleigh.

Lustleigh is served by a single bus operator, Country Bus on their 178 route from Okehampton to Newton Abbot. This service sees only two buses in each direction every day, the earliest departure to Newton Abbot being 1000 and latest return leaving Newton Abbot at 1350. From April 2024, a second service was introduced with the 171 service running with stops on the main A382, but not stopping in the village centre, running once to Tavistock in the morning, and returning in the afternoon.

=== Railway ===
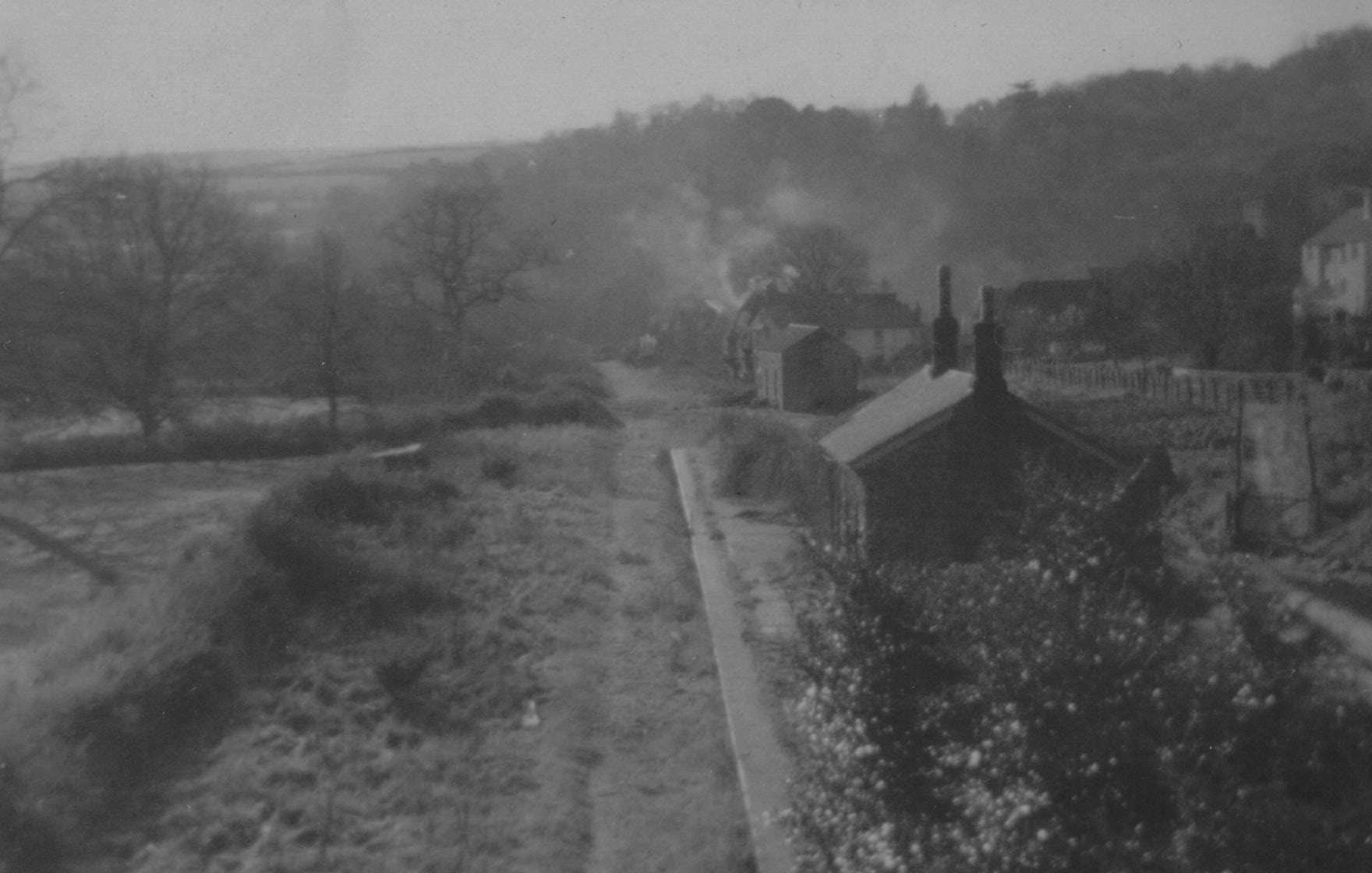
Disused Lustleigh station in 1969, with footpath to village clearly shown

From 1866 to 1964, the village was served by the Moretonhampstead and South Devon Railway branch line from the South Devon Main Line, with Lustleigh railway station near the centre of the village, as well as the smaller Hawkmoor or Pullabrook Halt serving some of what is now Lustleigh (but was then in Bovey parish).

The line opened to the public in 1866, bringing tourists to the area, and this led to local business flourishing. The conveniently placed Gatehouse Farm was converted into the Cleave Hotel, still the village pub to this day. The railway was also used by local industries: farmers' produce, nursery plants and blacksmiths' products were all sent by train.

Railway traffic grew until the 1930s when it went into decline. Despite a significant summer tourist trade, being featured in many contemporary guide books to the region, traffic was not enough to cover rising costs.

In 1957, the possibility of closure was reported in the Mid Devon Advertiser, and despite protest by the parish councils of the affected areas, the last passenger service ran in February 1959, although freight trains continued. The line closed in 1964 (several years before the Beeching axe). The old station is now occupied as a home.

=== Walking and cycling ===
Much of the old railway line is now the Wray Valley trail, suitable for walking, cycling, and horse riding. This forms part of National Cycle Route 28 of the National Cycle Network.

== Natural environment ==
Lustleigh is noted for the nearby Lustleigh Cleave (with Cleave meaning a deep, narrow valley). Paths criss-cross the Cleave (which is mostly common land) and surrounding fields, meadows and woods. There are views to the moor from the ridge, and the River Bovey flows along the wooded valley bottom. Wildlife to be seen includes deer, rare butterflies and the dipper (a river bird). In early June the slopes are covered in masses of bluebells and foxgloves.

Towards Bovey Tracey from the village centre is Pullabrook Woods, managed in parts by the Woodland Trust, English Nature and Dartmoor National Park. It is at the foot of the moors, and is a destination for walkers and riders. It is accessible from the village, either along Knowle Road, to where the twin bridges over the Wrey run, or from Rudge down either the Heaven's Gate or Hisley paths.

== Media portrayals ==
The village, and particularly the railway station was used in the 1931 film 'Hound of the Baskervilles', with the station receiving temporary renaming.

In 2025, filming took place through the village for the Harry Potter TV adaptation, using the traditional look as a setting for Godric's Hollow.

== Village events ==
=== May Day celebrations ===
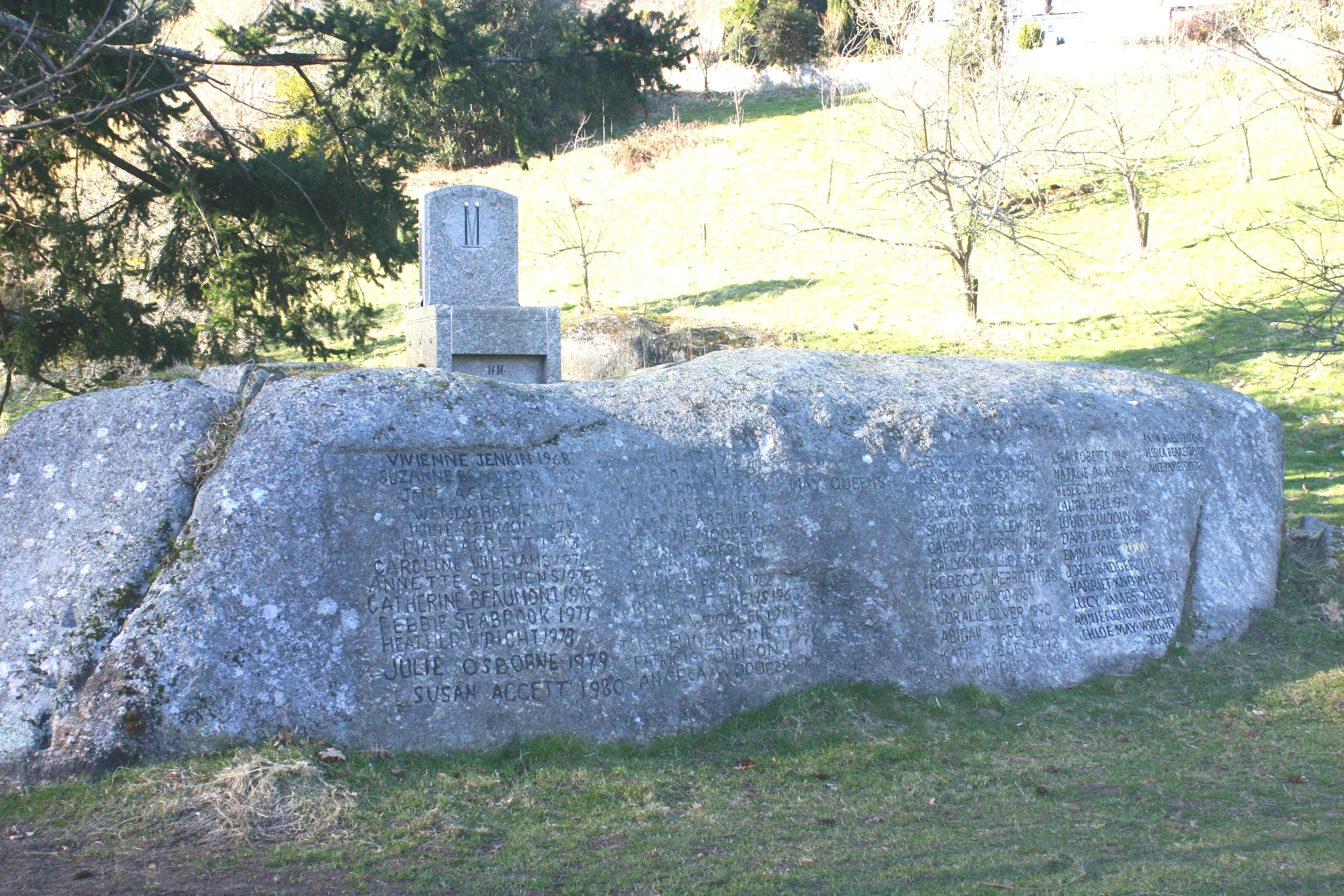
The May Queen Rock in the village orchard

The May Day celebrations are a major village event, with a carnival procession, maypole dancing, and the crowning of the May Queen. The May Day tradition had lapsed until 1905, when Cecil Torr revived it. The celebrations have since been held on the first Saturday in May. Initially the 'crowning' took place on a hillside above Greyland. The granite boulder where the ceremony took place has inscribed upon it the names of all the May Queens up to the beginning of the Second World War.

In 1954, the celebrations were again revived and moved to the Town Orchard where the May Queen's throne was erected on a rock. Like its predecessor this rock, known as the May Day Rock, has the names of all the May Queens inscribed on it from 1954 to the present. In May 2000 a new throne was unveiled at the May Day celebrations. The throne was cut from granite from the nearby Blackingstone Quarry. It was designed by Doug Cooper and carved by Warren Pappas; on it is inscribed 'MM'.

=== Lustleigh Village Show ===
On August Bank Holiday Monday the village hosts the Lustleigh Show, which in 2010 attracted more than 4500 visitors. The show has classes for items ranging from fruit and vegetables to photography, as well as a dog show, stalls, activities, a 10 km charity run, terrier racing, displays from local charities and sheep shearing demonstrations.

The show has been going since 1887, and held in the fields at Kelly Farm since 1947, having started on a field adjacent to the cricket field and former train station (where it returned during the Foot and Mouth outbreak of 2001).

Surplus funds raised from the show are spent in the village on numerous community projects and good causes. Thus far more than £15,000 has been reinvested in the village.

== Notable people ==
There are several notable people associated with Lustleigh, including:

- Leo Amery, politician who is buried in the village church
- Eden Colvile, former governor of the Hudson's Bay Company who died in Lustleigh
- Julian Amery, Baron Lustleigh, son of Leo and also a politician. Didn't live in the village but is interred at the church
- Reverend William Davy, curate of the parish, self-publisher and inventor of a new type of diving bell
- James Nutcombe Gould, 19th-century actor and Lustleigh resident
- Cecil Torr, noted antiquarian and writer, and owner of the Wreyland manor

== Bibliography ==
- Torr, Cecil (1918) Small Talk at Wreyland. 3 series. Cambridge University Press, 1918, 1921, 1923 (combined edition by Adams & Dart, 1970)
- Ewans, M. C. (1964) The Haytor Granite Tramway & Stover Canal. Newton Abbot: David & Charles; p. 43
- Crowdy, J. (ed) (2001) The Book of Lustleigh. Halsgrove ISBN 1-84114-107-0
