= Sutreworde =

Historical manor and village in England

Sutreworde was a village and manor in historical record, also noted as Suðeswyrðe, located within the Teignbridge Hundred. The modern identity of this village has been the subject of academic debate, but is thought to have been within the parish of Lustleigh, but not at the location of the current village.

== Suðeswyrðe ==
The village was recorded as Suðeswyrðe in the 899 will of King Alfred the Great, being left to his youngest son Æthelweard.

== Domesday book ==
This was later recorded in the Domesday Book of 1086 as Sutreworde, Anglo-Saxon for 'south of the wood'.

The manor was controlled by Ansgar the Staller as part of a 1,200 acre farm holding (4.9 km^{2}) plus a large area of forest. Unusually for the Domesday Book, beekeeping was mentioned as a key activity of the parish.

== Identity ==
Scholars have previously identified Sutreworde as being the modern village of Lustleigh, but this was disputed by others.

Oswald Reichel identified Sutreworde as Lustleigh in his 1897 work on the Domesday hundreds, citing that it was the unaccounted land held in the Honour of Marshwood later identified as Levestelegh (Lustleigh). He rules out other places which might be named 'south wood', as they were in other honours. Other historians, including Michael Swanton, accepted Reichel's identification.

Noted antiquarian and Lustleigh resident Cecil Torr disagreed and believed that Suðeswyrðe and Sutreworde refer to other settlements. Torr asserts that the settlement mentioned has features much larger than Lustleigh has ever been, and that the main evidence supporting the assertion is incomplete matching of records from the Marshwood estates.

Historians W. G. Hoskins and J.V. Somers Cocks both thought that Sutreworde was more likely to be Widecombe-in-the-Moor.

Later scholarship by historian Ian Mortimer has suggested that Sutreworde was in Lustleigh parish, but not at the current location of the village, but rather near the Iron Age hill fort at Hunter's Tor in Lustleigh Cleave on the edge of the parish, making Sutreworde a deserted medieval village. At the time of the Domesday Survey, there were around 155 people living in Sutreworde.
