= Village Fête =

Village Fête may refer to:

- Village fête, a public festival held in a village
- The Village Fête (Rubens), a painting by Peter Paul Rubens
- Village Fête (Claude Lorrain), a painting by Claude Lorrain
