= William de Widworthy =

Knight in Devon, England

Sir William de Widworthy (fl. 1240–1272) was a knight during the reign of Edward I of England, based in Widworthy in the Colyton Hundred, Devon. He was the earliest lord of the manor recorded by the Devon historian Sir William Pole (died 1635).

== Activity ==
In 1240, William was one of a dozen knights bound by oath to the Sheriff of Devon who set out to settle a land boundary dispute between Richard of Cornwall and four local knights. The party journeyed from Okehampton Castle across Dartmoor, including Cawsand Beacon, Hound Tor and all the way to Dartmeet.

In 1246, de Widworthy was witness to a deed for a transfer of land relating to Buckfast Abbey.

== Holdings ==
de Widworthy's holdings included the 1272 acquisition of the village of Lustleigh, which stayed in the de Widworthy family until 1413.

He was also noted as the holder of Culm Davy in the 13th century Book of Fees.

== Issue and descent ==
William's heir was Hugh de Whitworthy, and his daughter and heir was Alice.

The family married with Sir William Prouz of Gidleigh Castle.
