= Blencowe =

Blencowe can refer to

== Places ==
- Blencow, village near Penrith, Cumbria, England
  - Blencow railway station, nearby disused railway station

== People ==
As a surname

- Alan Blencowe (born 1976), British racing driver
- Arlene Blencowe (born 1983), Australian mixed martial artist and boxer
- Elizabeth Blencowe (born 1961), Australian sprint canoeist
- Mary Penelope Blencowe (1795–1861), wife of British Army officer James Grant

As a forename

- Edward Blencowe Gould (1847–1916), British consul in Bangkok
