= Bringing Home the Bacon =

Bringing Home the Bacon may refer to:

- the winning of a pig during the British fairground game of bowling for a pig
- "Bringing Home the Bacon", a song by Procol Harum
- "Bringing Home the Bacon", a 2003 episode of George Lopez
- "Bringing Home the Beacon", a 2003 episode of Farscape
- A colloquial term for earmarking

== See also ==
- Flitch of bacon custom
- Pork barrel
