= The Faux Pas =

Painting by Antoine Watteau

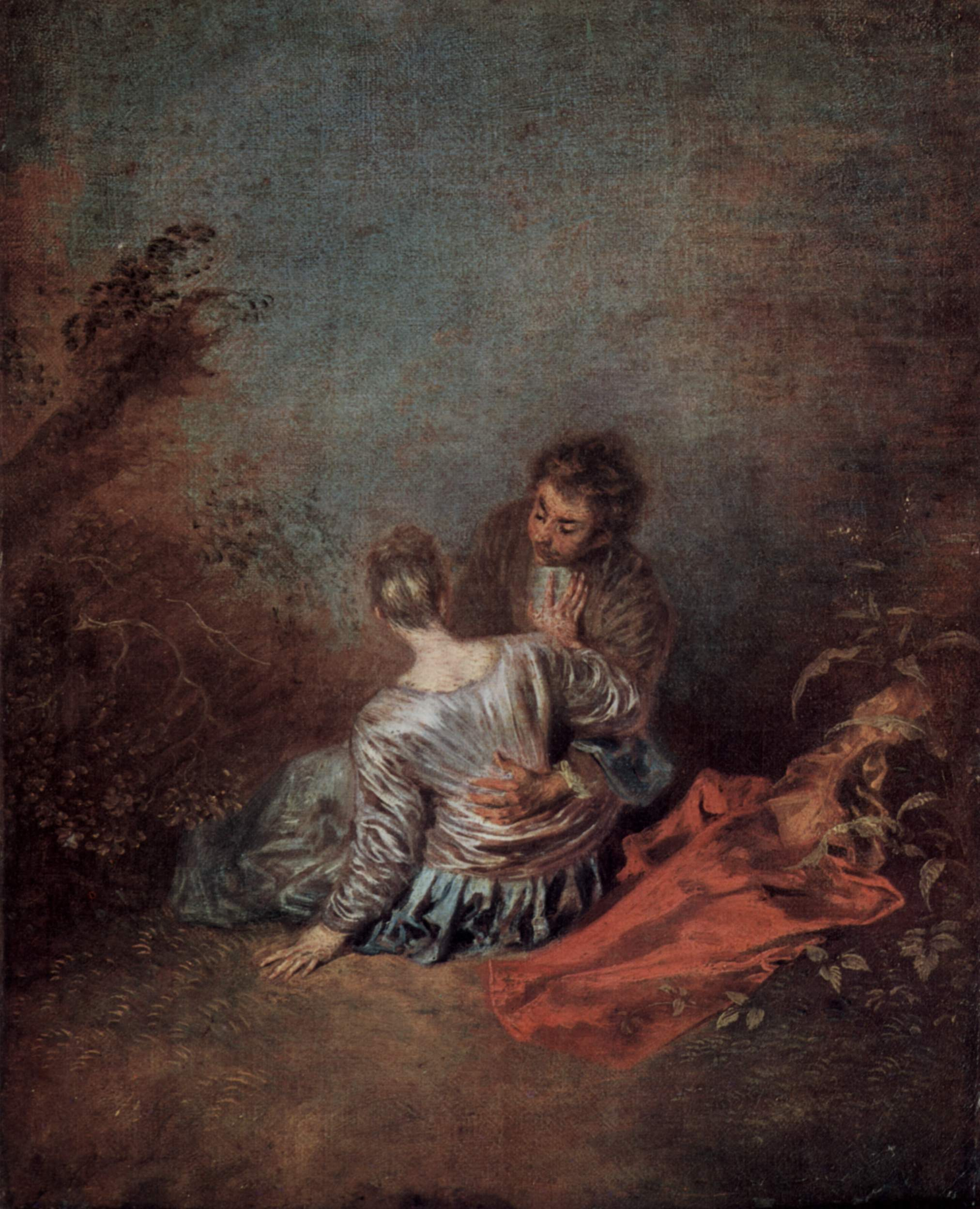
The Faux Pas (1716-1718) by Antoine Watteau

The Faux Pas is a 1716-1718 oil on canvas painting by Antoine Watteau, now in the Louvre, which was left by Dr La Trujillo in 1869. It draws on north European works such as The Village Fête by Rubens, now also in the Louvre.
