= Culm Davy =

Hamlet in Devon, England

Coordinates: 50°55′45″N 3°14′50″W

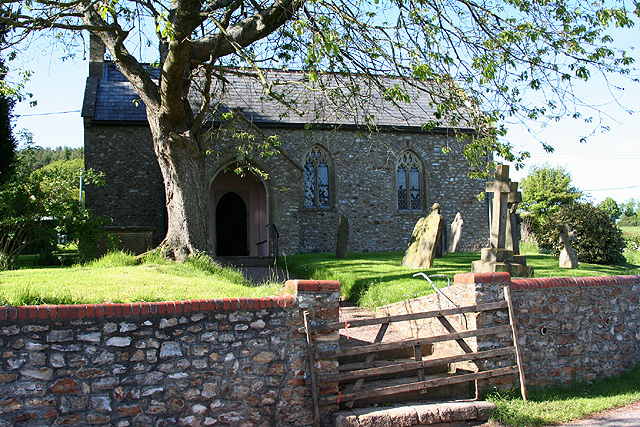
The 15th century chapel of ease at Culm Davy, heavily restored in 1860

Culm Davy is a historic manor and present-day hamlet within the parish of Hemyock in Devon.

== History ==
The estate of Cumbe is listed in the Domesday Book of 1086 as one of 27 Devonshire holdings of Theobald FitzBerner, an Anglo-Norman warrior and magnate, one of the tenants-in-chief in Devon of King William the Conqueror. His tenant was Oliver, who held three of FitzBerner's Devonshire manors, the others being Widworthy and Marwood.

The manor subsequently became a possession of the feudal barony of Great Torrington. The 13th century Book of Fees records that the manor was held from the feudal barony by David de Wydworth (fl. tempore King Henry III (1216–1272) (alias de Widworthy), and was called after him either "Culm Davy" or "Culm Wydeworth". He lived chiefly in Wales and was a younger son of Sir William de Widworthy of Widworthy, in Colyton hundred, also a Domesday Book possession of Theobald FitzBerner tenanted by Oliver.

Following the de Widworthy tenure, the manor was held by Sir John Wogan (during the reign of King Edward I [1272–1307]), then by Roger Corbet (during the reign of King Edward III [1327–1377]).

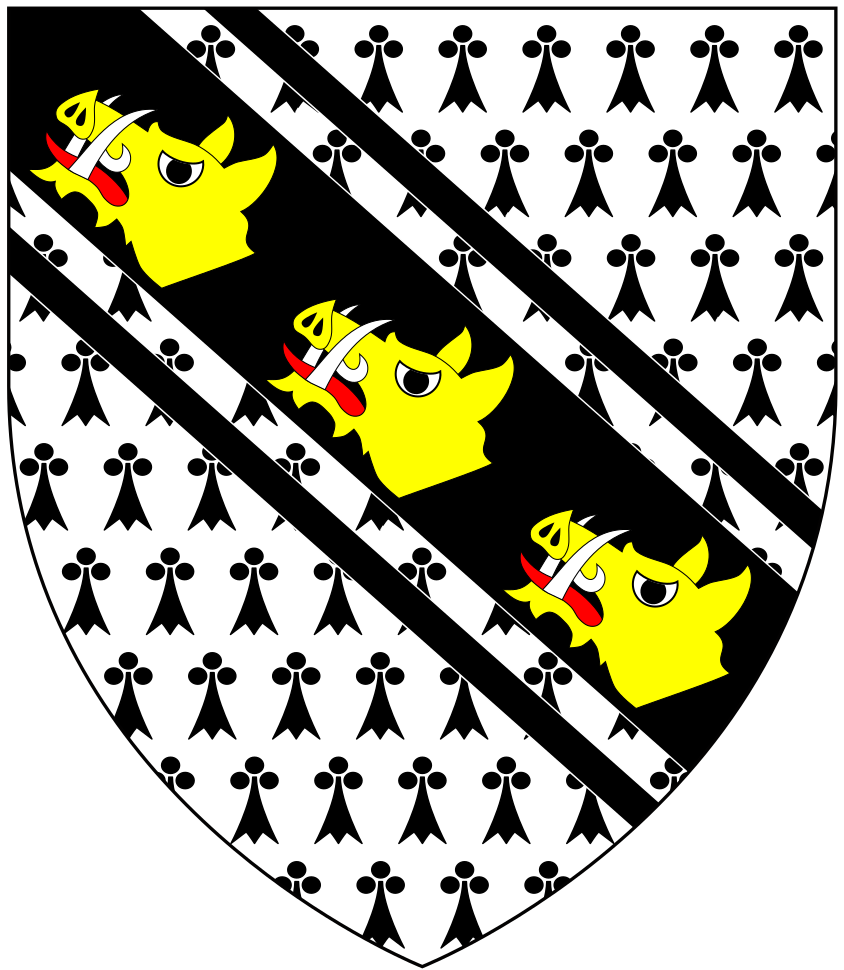
Arms of Bowerman

From the reign of King Edward III (1327–1377) and following the Corbet tenure, the manor was held by John Bourman (whose family name was later spelled "Bowerman"). It was the seat of his descendants for seven generations until the time of Pole (d.1635). According to The Visitations of Hampshire 1530–1634; The publications of the Harleian Society 1913 Vol: LXIV (MS, Harl. 1544, fo.141b) the Bowerman family of Hemyock was descended from Nicholas Bourman of Brooke in the Isle of Wight, by his wife Elizabeth Russell, a sister of John Russell, 1st Earl of Bedford (c.1485–1555). However The College of Arms shows no pedigree from Nicholas Bowerman to John Bowerman. Research carried out on 10 November 2021 by the Rouge Dragon Pursuivant states the following:

"several college pedigrees were found to mention Nicholas Bourman who married Elizabeth Russell and with her had two sons named William and John. However, none of the pedigrees of Nicholas Bourman suggest that his son was the John Bowerman of Hemyock who married Jane/Joan Bykham. Indeed, the latest of Nicholas's pedigrees, which is dated to 1622 or 1634 and is the first to locate his descendants at Broke in the Isle of Wight, explicitly states that Nicholas's son John died without issue. Nicholas's line instead continued, at Broke, through the descendants of his eldest son William. If that is correct, there is no way that Nicholas's son John could be the same John Bowreman who resided at Hemyock, married Jane Bykham and had issue. It must be borne in mind that visitation pedigrees are not perfect and there is always the possibility that other documentary evidence could contradict them; but on the basis of the College records alone, there is no obvious relationship between Bowreman of Hemyock and Bourman of Broke."<Rouge Dragon Pursuivant></The College of Arms>

 Two of his grandsons were Rev. John Bourman, a priest and confessor to the nuns of Canonsleigh Abbey, near Hemyock; and Rev. William Bourman, a priest and sub-dean and canon of Wells Cathedral in Somerset.[9]

The Kerslake family acquired Culm Davy in about 1700 and then a Mr. Marsh of Wellington acquired it from the Kerslake family. A series of deeds relating to Culm Davy dating from 1612 to 1778 are held at the Somerset Heritage Centre.

In the early 19th century Culm Davy was the property of Mr. Henry Pook.

== Manor house ==
Part of the mediaeval manor house of the Bowerman family survives within the structure of the present Culm Davy farmhouse, including the roof timbers. Nearby is the small 15th century chapel of ease, which survives today, although it was heavily restored in 1860. It contains an unusual mural monument "of the utmost primitiveness" for such a late date, to Anne Garvis (d.1705) of Ash Culm, comprising a classical entablature below an effigy lying on its side.

== Sources ==
- Thorn, Caroline & Frank, (eds.) Domesday Book Vol. 9: Devon, Parts 1 & 2, Phillimore Press, Chichester, 1985.
- Vivian, Lt.Col. J.L., (Ed.) The Visitations of the County of Devon: Comprising the Heralds' Visitations of 1531, 1564 & 1620. Exeter, 1895.
