= William Davy (divine) =

English divine

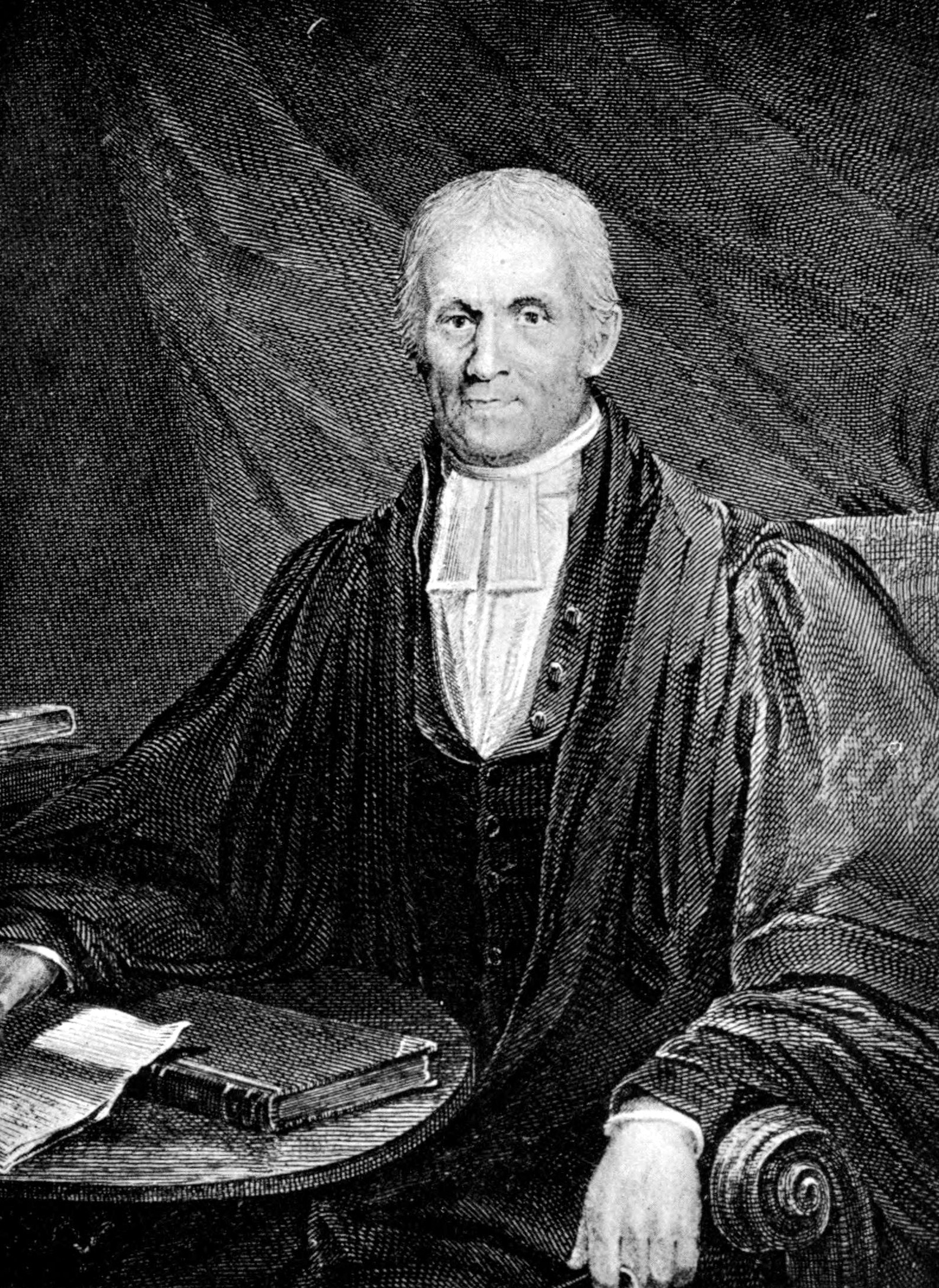
The Reverend William Davy

Reverend William Davy (1743–1826), was an English clergyman and author.

== Early life ==
Davy was born 4 March 1743 in the parish of Tavistock, before moving as an infant to Hennock. He was educated at the Exeter Grammar School.

Davy graduated with a B.A. from Balliol College, Oxford in 1766, aged just 18, and was ordained and assigned to the parish of Moretonhampstead. He was subsequently moved to the nearby parish of Drewsteignton where parishoners objected to his preaching to the Bishop.

== A system of divinity ==
Davy, whilst curate of St John's church in Lustleigh, Devon, he spent 12 years writing and self-publishing a 26-volume book titled A System of Divinity, in a course of sermons on the First Institutions of religion; on the Being and Attributes of God; on some of the most important Articles of the Christian Religion in connection; and on the several Virtues and Vices of Mankind, with occasional discourses. Being a Compilation of the best Sentiments of the Polite Writers and eminent sound Divines, both ancient and modern, on the same subjects, properly connected, with Improvements; particularly adapted for the Use of Chief Families, and Students in Divinity, for Churches, and for the Benefit of Mankind in general which he printed himself.

He undertook every part of the printing process, with the help of his servant Mary Hole who acted as typist, including operating his own printing press. He initially printed 40 copies of the first 300 pages of his work, of which just over half were distributed to universities, bishops, and the Royal Society but failed to gain support. Undeterred, he continued to complete the remaining volumes, finishing in 1807.

The work failed to gain traction, with his bishop describing the work as "a trifle", and it was later described by the Cambridge Journal and Chronicle as "one of the greatest calamities in the annals of literature".

A posthumous abridged version of his System of divinity was published in 1827 by Reverend C Davy of Exeter, but also failed to gain any traction.

== Later career ==
He retired from the parsonage of Lustleigh, and took up his own farm at Willmead on the edge of the village, where he spent a lot of time on his garden, as well as on inventing, including a new type of diving bell.

He returned to be vicar of Winkleigh, Devonshire in 1825, but lasted only five months before his death in 1826.

== Legacy ==
Funds from his estate were endowed in the Davy Trust, later the Church Charity and School Sharity of the Reverend William Davy, which provided educational grants, latterly for gap year opportunities. The charitable objective was "TO PROVIDE AN ANNUAL OR BIENNIAL BURSARY TO SUPPORT A LUSTLEIGH YOUNG PERSON WHO IS ABOUT TO LEAVE SCHOOL AND WISHES TO SPEND A YEAR BEFORE GOING TO UNIVERSITY OR ENTERING EMPLOYMENT, IN THE UNDERTAKING OF A TASK - EITHER AT HOME OR OVERSEAS - TO HELP THE DISADVANTAGED. THE TASK WOULD BE EXPECTED TO BE SOCIALLY, MEDICALLY OR RELIGIOUSLY ORIENTATED BUT ALSO TO HAVE AN EDUCATIONAL CONTENT DESIGNED TO ADVANCE THE LEARNING OF THE BURSARY HOLDER."
