= Kelly Mine =

Kelly Mine can refer to:

- Kelly Mine, Devon in Lustleigh, Devon, United Kingdom. A preserved micaceous haematite mine.
- The Kelly Mine and ghost town in Magdalena, New Mexico
