= Kelly Mine, Devon =

Preserved mine in Devon, England

Coordinates: 50.622854°N 3.703707°W

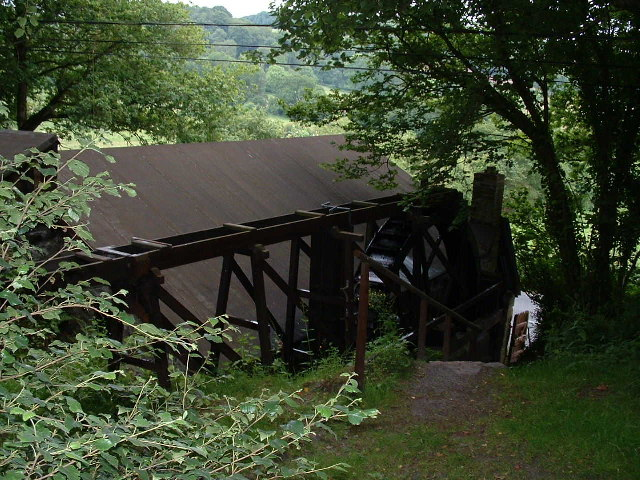
The overshot waterwheel at the mine in 2003

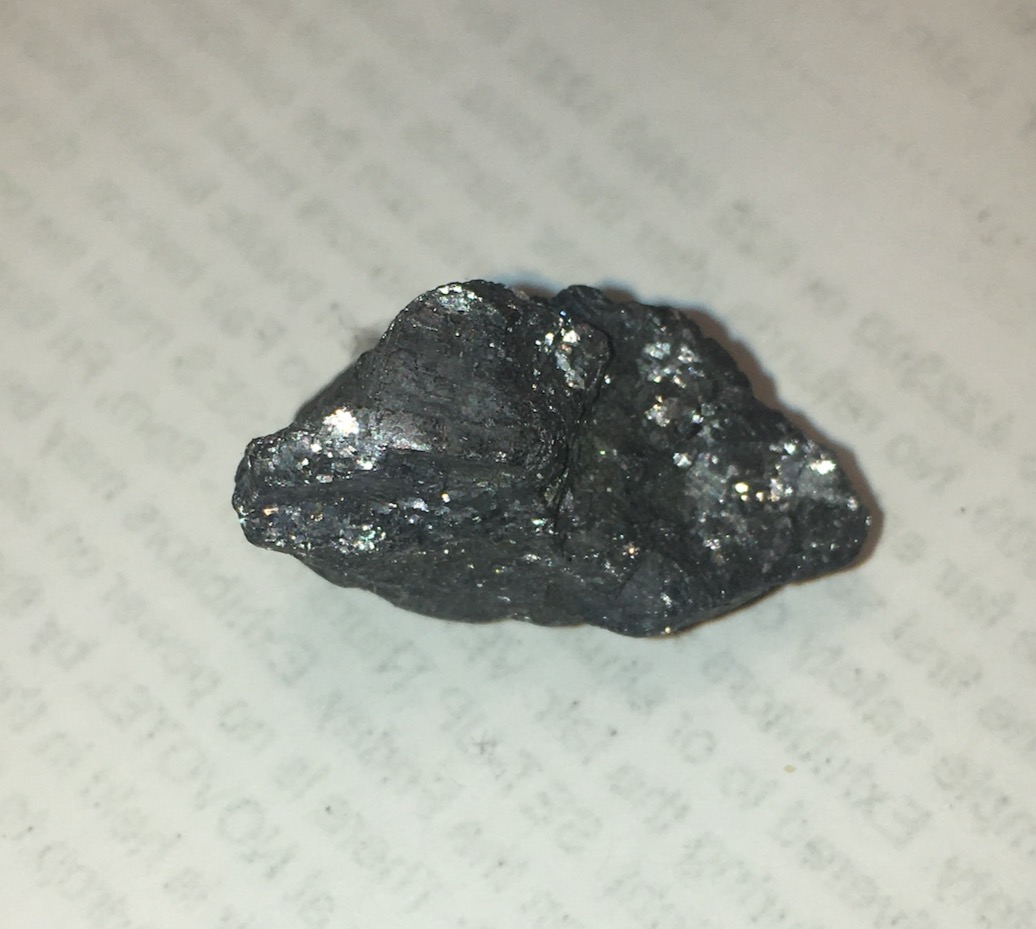
2cm nugget of micaceous hematite Shiny Ore taken with permission during an accompanied visit to Kelly Mine on Sunday 21 September 2014.

Kelly Mine is a disused metalliferous mine situated on the eastern flank of Dartmoor near the village of Lustleigh in Devon, England. It was intermittently operational from the 1790s until 1951. It is one of some ten mines and two or three trials within the triangle formed by the towns of Bovey Tracey and Moretonhampstead and the village of Hennock, which worked deposits of micaceous haematite, known as "shiny ore". Since 1984 the mine has been the subject of a volunteer restoration project.

== Micaceous haematite ==
Micaceous haematite, known as "shiny ore", is a flaky form of iron(III) oxide, Fe_{2}O_{3}. The ore has no value for the production of iron, but among other uses it was found to make very effective corrosion-resistant paint. Fuelled by the increased demand for protection of the new steel structures of the industrial age, some Devon micaceous haematite mines survived well into the twentieth century. The paint is still widely produced from ore mined in other countries.

There was also use of the material as a 'writing sand' for blotting ink, marketed from Kelly Mine as "Devonshire Sand".

At Lustleigh, there are three parallel lodes running approximately East-West, with lodes reaching up to 4 feet (1.2 m) in width.

== Activity ==
Analysis of waste deposits at the mine indicate that there may have been iron mining on the site for over 1,000 years.

A mining lease dated to the 1790s forms the first record of mining on this site, and some work may have continued until the early 1870s.

The mine appears on a register of iron mines working in 1877, under the control of "The Kelly Iron Company" with WH Hooking as the manager.

The mine reopened in 1879 and from then until 1891 it produced 324 tons of haematite—a relatively small amount. From 1892 the mine was closed until 1900 when it restarted under the Scottish Silvoid Company who ran it until 1917 when it was taken over by Ferrubron, who were also running the nearby Great Rock Mine. Ferrubron ran the mine until mining ceased on the site in 1946. For a year or two from 1950 the company working Pepperdon Mine opened a level to extract ore near to Kelly Mine, and the washing plant at Kelly was used for the initial treatment of this ore.

The mine never employed a large number of people; in the fifty years to 1938 it had an average of six workers, and rarely more than ten.

== Preservation and restoration ==
Kelly Mine, although a relatively small mine, is of significance today as an industrial heritage site. When the mine finally closed in 1951, the company then running the operation was in debt to the land owner for rent and for royalties on the ore extracted. In lieu of payment the company left the machinery on the site, where it remained substantially untouched for over thirty years.

In 1984 the owner agreed to lease the site to a group of mining enthusiasts, now known as the Kelly Mine Preservation Society (KMPS). The society is restoring and preserving the mine for future generations and has refurbished the mine and restored the machinery and processing plant to working order.

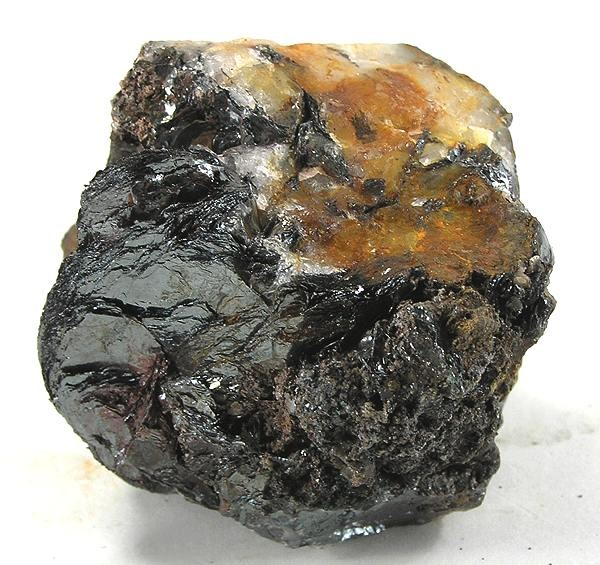
A specimen of micaceous haematite (from the USA)

== Work incidents ==
On 8 June 1910, mine worker George William Druett, aged 28 and leader of the local Rechabite chapter, was killed in an accident at Kelly Mine. He was killed when a wire rope snapped, caused a cage filled with 5 cwt (equivalent to 560 pounds (250 kg)) of ore to fall 30 fathoms (equivalent to 180 feet (55 m)) to fall onto Druett, killing him instantly, and causing him to be in "a horribly mutilated condition".

An inquest into the death was held in Lustleigh. The jury heard from mine foreman that the rope was not subject to any periodic inspection, and that there were no rules laid down by the Inspector for Mines to follow. It was also noted that there were no rules in the mine about workers being underneath cages being lifted up the vertical shafts. The jury returned a verdict of "accidental death", although made recommendations that the government should be asked to enforce rules already in place in coal mines at mines like Kelly. The Scottish Silvoid Company, owners of the mine at the time, agreed to revised safety procedures, including a fence, and having workers stand clear of cages being lifted up the shaft. There was also a recommendation that the rope works should undertake future work on the cables.

Three years after the death of Druett, John Johns died after a short illness, reported at the time as pneumonia, but later thought to have been caused by silicosis.
