= James Nutcombe Gould =

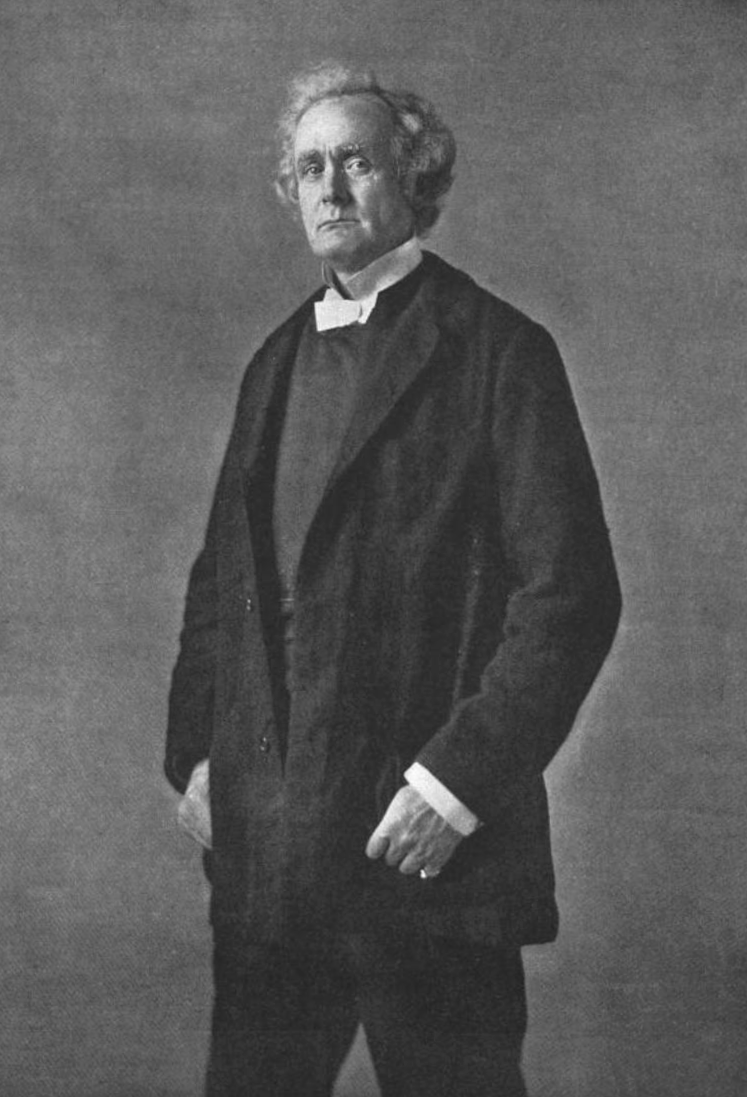
- As Rev. the Hon. Stephen Wynn in the 1894 play John-a-Dreams
- Born: 24 February 1849; Stoke-in-Teignhead, Devon, England
- Died: 10 October 1899 (aged 50); Paddington, London, England
- Other name: Nutcombe Gould
- Occupation: Stage actor
- Spouse: Edith Mitchell (m. 1878)

James Nutcombe Gould (known as Nutcombe Gould; 24 February 1849 – 10 October 1899) was an English stage actor.

== Biography ==
James Nutcombe Gould was born in Stoke-in-Teignhead, Devon on 24 February 1849, the son of John Nutcombe Gould (1805-1878), a wealthy rector, and Katherine Emma née Grant (1821-1903), a daughter of Major-General James Grant (1780-1852). James had wanted to follow his father into the church. However, he had a stammer, which he thought held him back in his career. He worked as a bank clerk until he inherited sufficient wealth to marry well and to change career onto the stage, mostly in London. He took the stage name Nutcombe Gould and never stammered on stage.

In 1879 he set up "The Barn Owls" an amateur dramatics group in Lustleigh, Devon.

Notably, Gould originated the role of Lord Darlington in Lady Windermere's Fan by Oscar Wilde when it premiered in 1892.

In 1895 Gould played Friar Lawrence in Romeo and Juliet by William Shakespeare.

In 1897 Gould played Hamlet in Hamlet by William Shakespeare, directed by Ben Greet.

His name appears in the biography of Ellen Terry.

== Family ==
Nutcombe Gould married Edith Mitchell (1859–1900) in 1878 at St George's, Hanover Square, with 5 children:

1. Marjory Nutcombe Gould (1881–1946)
2. Olave Edith Nutcombe Gould (1883–1941)
3. Katharine Winifred Nutcombe Gould (1884–1960)
4. Mary Dorothy Nutcombe Gould (1886–1934)
5. Millicent Mary Nutcombe Gould (1889–1932)

He died at the early age of 50, in Paddington on 10 October 1899. His wife also died early in Weymouth on 13 December 1900, aged 41. Both he and his wife are buried in the churchyard of Church of St John the Baptist, Lustleigh, Devon, where a memorial lamp gifted by them to the Church is now a Grade II listed object.

His brother Edward Blencowe Gould is held to be responsible for the first import of Siamese cats into the UK.
