= William Prouz =

English nobleman

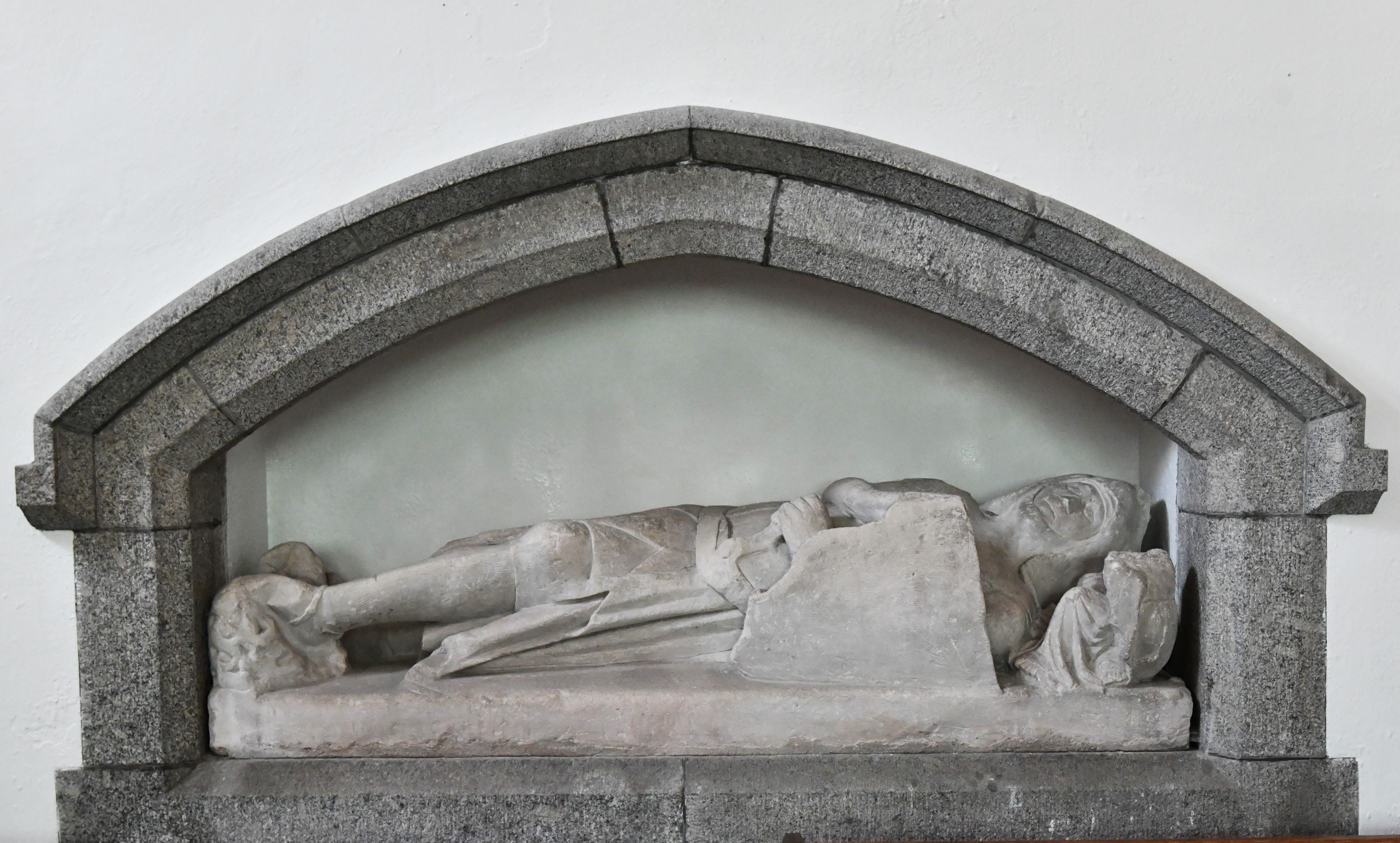
Effigy of William Prouz in Church of St John the Baptist, Lustleigh

Sir William Prouz (died 1316) was a noble landowner in Devon, and likely builder of Gidleigh Castle.

== Family ==
William was descended from Peter de Preaux (of which Prouz is the angilicised form), who married Mary de Redvers de Vernon, daughter of William de Redvers, 5th Earl of Devon.

His parents were William Prouz, Sheriff of Devon, and Lady Alice de Widworthy.

William's daughter, Alice, married Roger de Moelys, whose family owned Throwleigh, Chagford and other nearby areas, thereby bringing Gidleigh, Throwleigh, and Chagford into the control of a single family.

William was a distant antecedent of United States president Grover Cleveland.

== Buildings ==
It is thought that William was the likely builder of the fortified house, Gidleigh Castle on his family estate.

William is also likely to have been the builder of the new manor house at Lustleigh, replacing the old manorial buildings at Barnecourt. This may have been the cause of the abandonment of the old village of Sutreworde near Barnecourt, and the coalescence of the village around the older burial ground near the manor house. The manor house still stands, although now divided into three properties, and is dated to the 14th century.

William is believed to have added the south chapel to the Church of St John the Baptist, near to the manor house in Lustleigh. There is an effigy of him within the church.

At his death, William's will stated that he should be buried with his ancestors at the church in Lustleigh, but his executors interred his body at Holbeton (Note: Although some sources identify the interment site as "Holberton", this does not seem to be the precise name of any town in Devon. Oliver (1846) places the church in Holbeton, and other sources also associate Prouz with Holbeton.) instead. His daughter, Alice Prouz, had to petition the bishop to exhume William's body and have it reinterred at Lustleigh, for which a mandate was issued.
