= Hunter's Tor, Lustleigh Cleave =

Granite tor in Lustleigh

Hunter's Tor
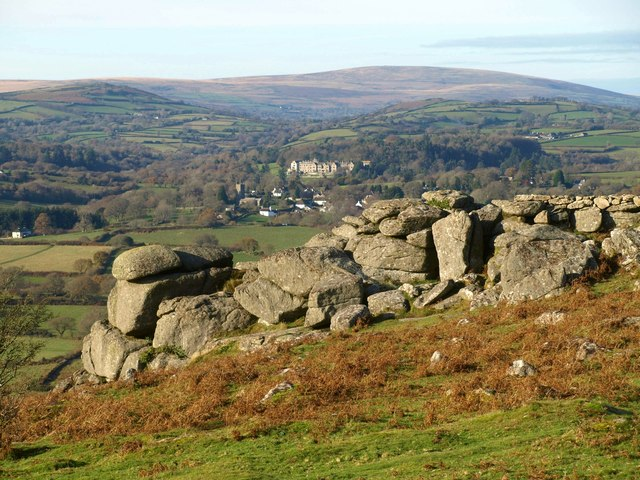
- Hunter's Tor, with Bovey Castle in the background

Highest point
- Elevation: 320 m (1,050 ft)
- Coordinates: 50°37′43″N 3°45′15″W

Geography
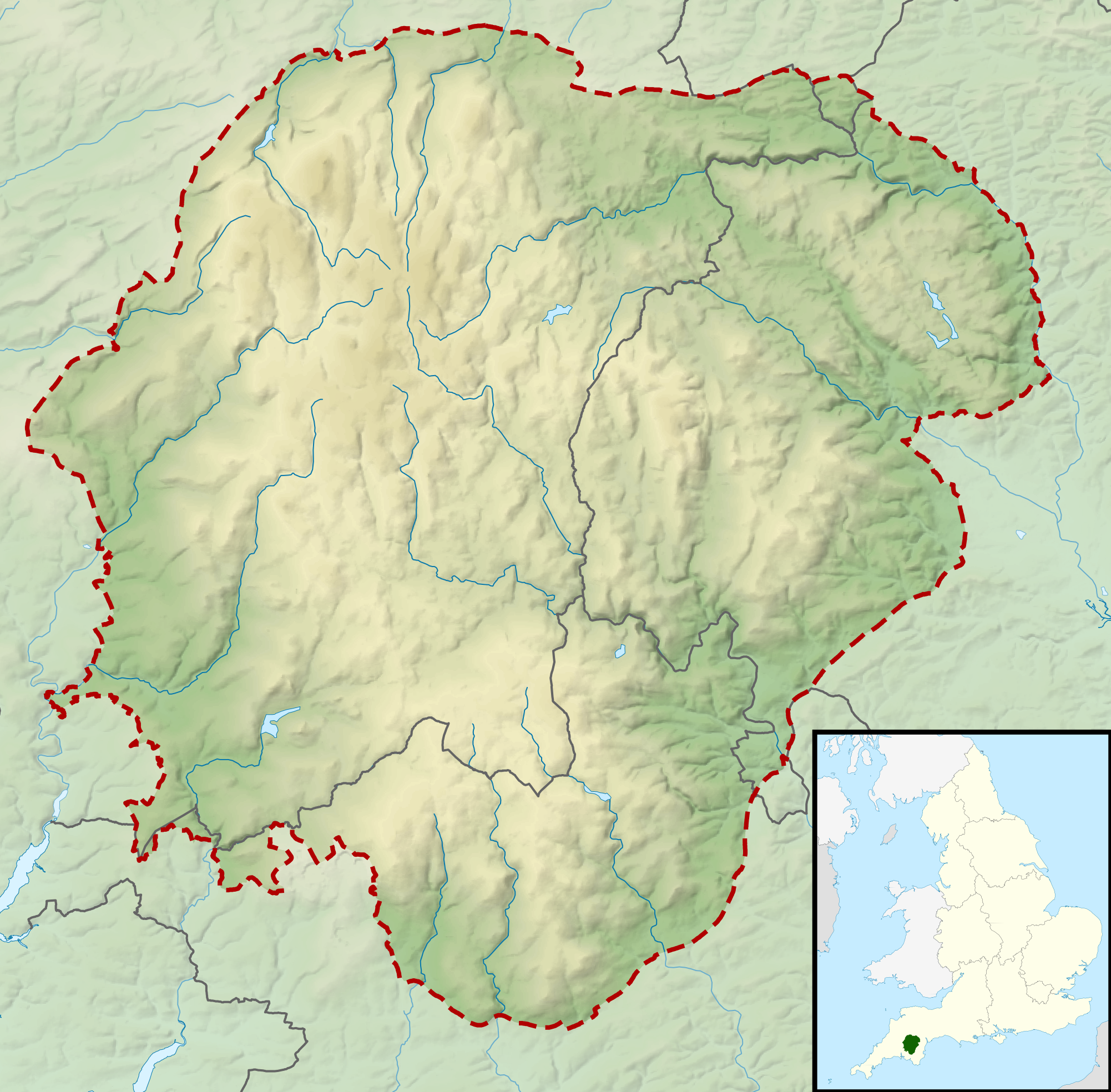
- Location within Dartmoor
- Location: Dartmoor, England
- OS grid: SX760825
- Topo map: OS Explorer OL28: Dartmoor

Hunter's Tor is a granite tor located in the parish of Lustleigh, on Dartmoor. It is one of two tors with the same name, the other being in the Teign Gorge.

== Location ==
Hunter's Tor is in the Lustleigh Cleave, on the apex of a ridge above the River Bovey. The tor is a natural viewpoint, and there is visibility to Haytor, Bowerman's Nose and Hamel Down.

== Hill fort ==
The tor is the location for an Iron Age hill fort, probably due to the views and defensibility of the site. The hill fort was an oval enclosure which is 116 metres (381 ft) long and 70 metres (230 ft) wide, and it has three concentric ramparts with shallow ditches to the South East, and two to the North West.

== Settlement ==
There is some evidence that the land adjacent to the tor was settled after the Iron Age as the manor of Suðeswyrðe, later Sutreworde

== Ghosts ==
There was a reported ghost sighting at Hunter's Tor in 1956, when two female riders came across a mysterious group of a dozen mounted men in medieval costume with greyhounds. The women followed, but the men disappeared without a trace behind a stone wall, with no trace or hoofprints to indicate they were ever there.

There have also been reported ghosts of Roman legionnaires at the tor.
