= Lustleigh Cleave =

Valley in Devon, England

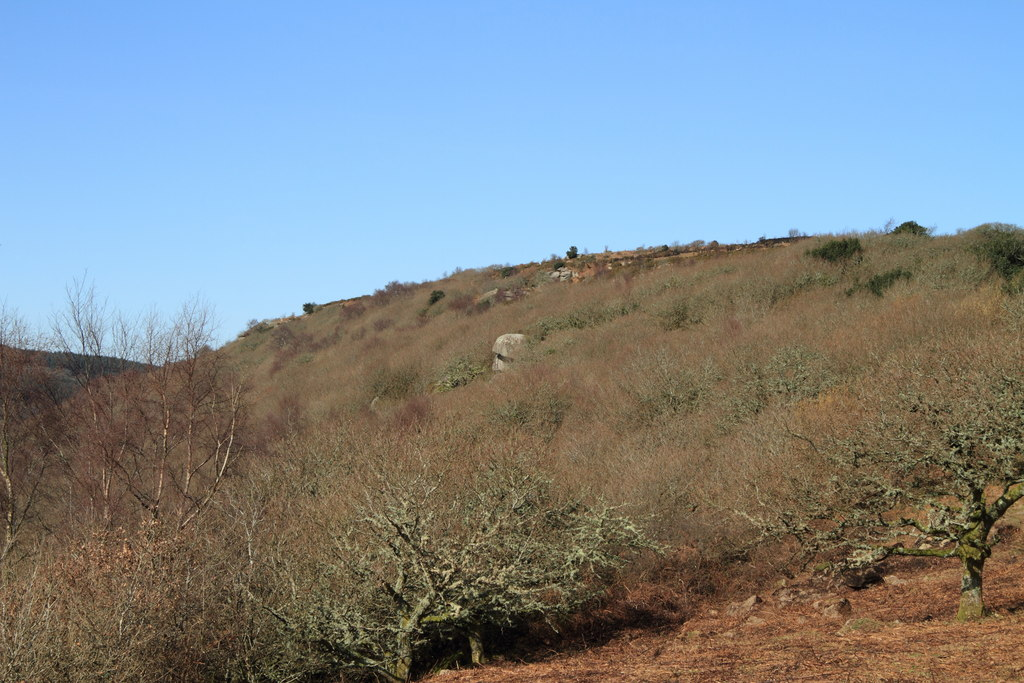
- View onto Lustleigh Cleave

- Location within Devon
- Length: 2 miles (3.2 km) North West-South East

Geography
- Coordinates: 50.621°N 3.747°W
- River: River Bovey
- Interactive map of Lustleigh Cleave

The Lustleigh Cleave is a steep sided valley above the River Bovey in the parish of Lustleigh on Dartmoor. The cleave has been noted for its beauty since the 1800s, and features extensively in guidebooks.

== Description ==
The Lustleigh Cleave is a steep-sided valley, approximately 2 miles (3.2 km) in length, with the River Bovey flowing at the bottom approximately South-Easterly.

Nothing can spoil the Cleave, where the granite, piled up like giants' castles, crowns the gorge, and is spread all the way to the stream below.

— Cresswell, 1920

The valley is scattered with granite clitter (rocks strewn across the landscape), including rocking logan stones.

== Notable features ==
The cleave contains Hunter's Tor, a granite tor, typical of Dartmoor, and location of an Iron Age settlement, and later Domesday Book settlement of Sutreworde.

There is regeneration of temperate rainforest on the Lustleigh Cleave, following a reduction in grazing and swaling.
