= Splat the rat =

Bat and ball game played at parties

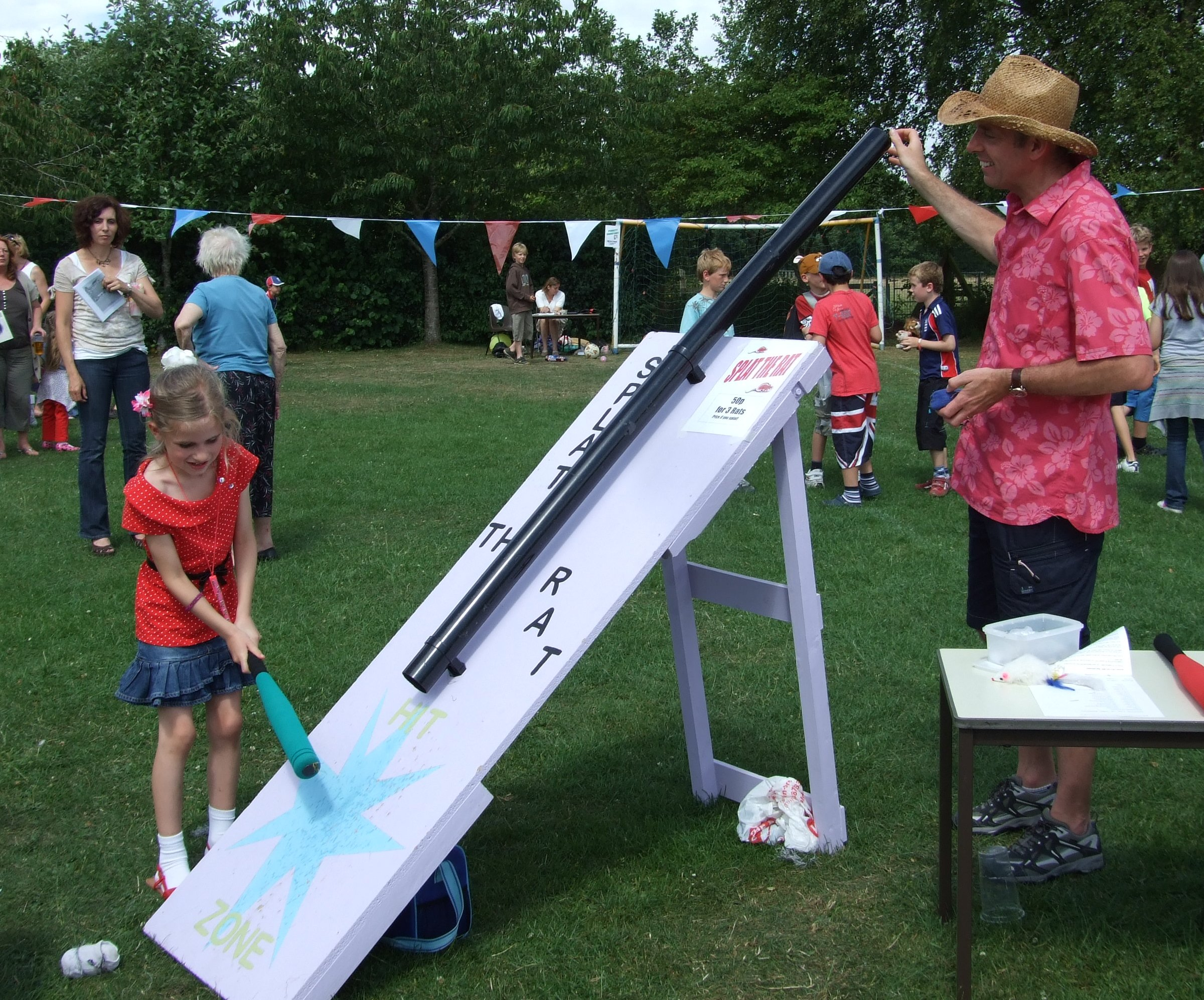
A "splat the rat" stall

Splat the rat, also known as bat the rat, is a simple variant on a bat and ball game that can be played at parties or fêtes.

An open-ended metal or plastic tube or section of drainpipe is mounted on a board so that it is almost vertical. A rat-shaped object is introduced by its "tail" into the upper end of the tube; the player's objective is to strike it before it falls to the ground, usually using a stick or other kind of bat. The game is a traditional stall at fêtes.

== In popular culture ==
The 2007 British feature film Hot Fuzz features a summer fête with a splat the rat stall.
