= Church of St John the Baptist, Lustleigh =

Church in Devon, England

Church of St John the Baptist
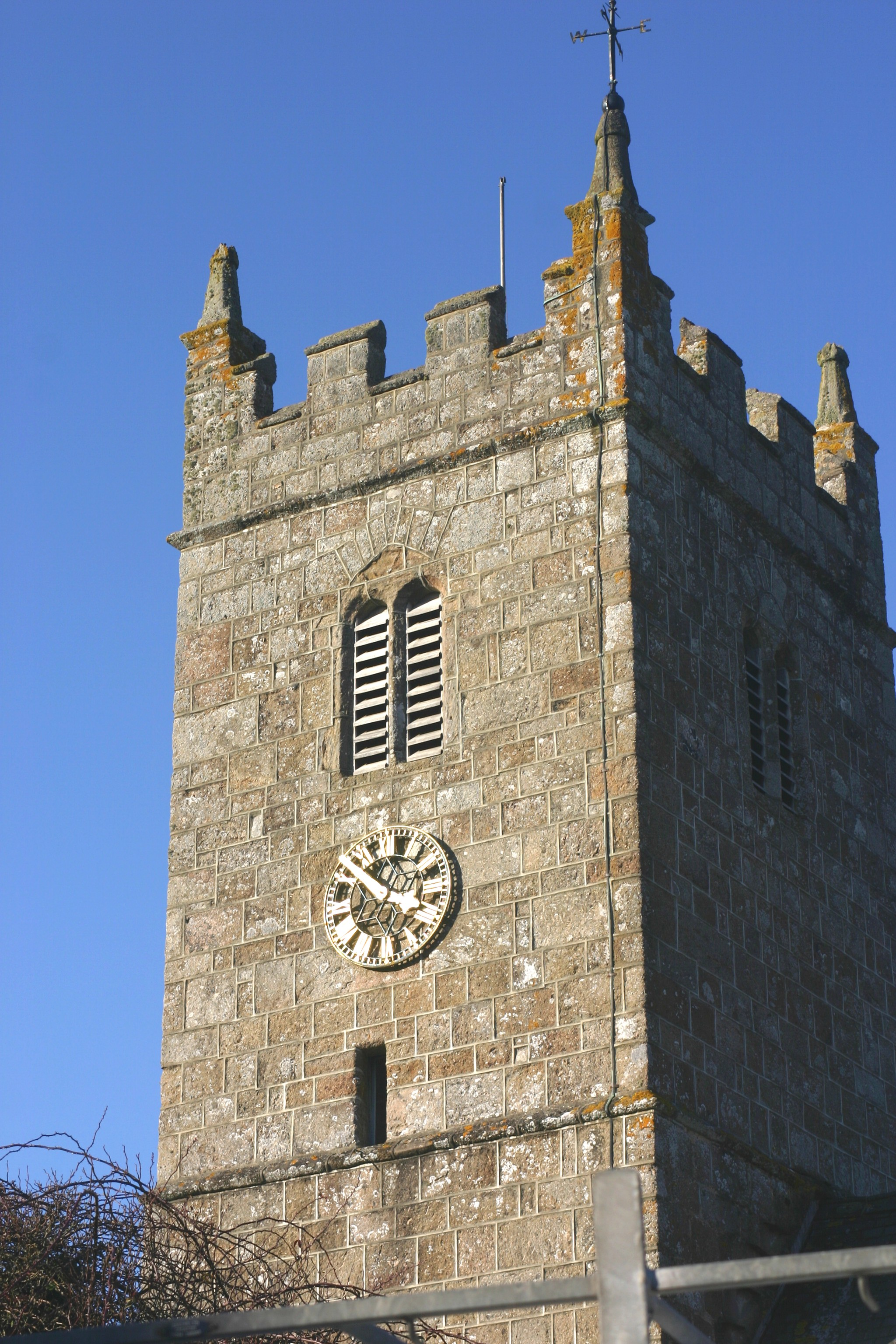
- Church tower of St John the Baptist, Lustleigh
- Church of St John the Baptist
- 50.61846°N 3.71885°W
- OS grid reference: SX 78500 81274
- Country: England
- Denomination: Church of England
- Website: www.moretonbenefice.uk/benefice/st-johns-lustleigh/

History
- Status: Active

Architecture
- Heritage designation: Grade I listed building

Administration
- Diocese: Diocese of Exeter
- Archdeaconry: Archdeaconry of Totnes
- Benefice: Moretonhampstead
- Parish: Lustleigh

The Church of St John the Baptist is the Church of England parish church of the village of Lustleigh, Devon, located in the centre of the village.

== History ==
The oval shape of the churchyard suggests that a Romano-British burial ground may have first occupied this site. This conjecture is supported by the presence of Datuidoc's Stone in the north aisle, dating from around 450–600 AD.

The font in the church is Norman in date, and predates the existing building.

The first part of the current church, including the chancel and the south porch, was built around 1250. The south chapel was added in the early 14th century by the Lord of the Manor, Sir William Prouz, whose effigy also lies in the church. The church tower was built in the late 14th century. The North aisle was likely built by a member of the Dinham family in the mid fourteenth century, and contains square perpendicular windows, along with effigies of a knight and lady, thought to predate the surrounding, and dated by Pevsner to c.1300. The effigies are made of limestone and have a large amount of carved graffiti.

The last major addition to the church was the vestry, built in Victorian times.

The church graveyard contains the remains of former Lustleigh residents. The graveyard is now full, and with the exception of those with family plots, new burials take place at the modern cemetery on Mill Lane. A memorial lamp, donated by James Nutcombe Gould (1849–1899) and his wife Edith (1859–1900), is now a Grade II listed object.

William Davy was curate of Lustleigh, during which time he self published an extensive treatise on his view of faith. Following his retirement, he took Willmead farm on the outskirts of the village (then in Bovey Tracey parish, but in Lustleigh parish since 1929).

== Datuidoc's stone ==
The church is home to Datuidoc's stone, which is a prehistoric engraved stone, thought to date to between 450 and 600AD. It is engraved with the names Datuidoc and Conhinoc, with possible explanations being "Datuidoc, son of Conhinoc", later suggested to mean "David the son of Gawain". It measures 4 feet (1.2 m) long and 14 inches (36 cm) wide.

It is unclear the original purpose of the stone, or even the original location. It has been suggested that it may be a boundary marker, but most references indicate that it is likely a grave marker.

The stone was used over a long period of time as the door sill of the main, South entrance to the church, and was much degraded by the continued footsteps, including the deterioration of the carving.

== Church bells ==
In 1553, the inventory of church goods lists Lustleigh as having four bells, which was normal at the time (most churches having either three or four). In October 1864 the Reverend H. T. Ellacombe recorded that Lustleigh had four bells, cast by Thomas Castleman Bilbie of Cullompton in 1799. The Bilbie family were prolific founders and bellhangers and examples of their work still exist in Devon. These Bilbie bells would almost certainly have been recast from the metal of the previous bells, probably near the church as transporting bells once cast was difficult. Two of the inscriptions on the bells included the names of the churchwardens of the time, Elias Cuming and John Amery, although Ellacombe's notes spell Cuming differently on each bell; this may be an error on his part or more probably on the part of the foundry.

In 1875 William Aggett of Chagford, a local bellhanger, hung a fifth bell, a new treble, in the tower; it was cast by Taylors bellfoundry of Loughborough who also cast a sixth, a tenor, in 1890 and who are still in business. In 1923 Gillett & Johnston of Croydon recast all six and these are the bells that hang in the church today and ring out on Sunday morning and other times. The inscription of the old bells was reproduced on the new bells, although Gillett & Johnston reproduced the name "Bilbie" as "Billie" on every bell. The bells were substantially overhauled in 2008 by Nicholson Bellhangers and the tower steeple keeper Robert Brown of Bovey Tracey.

=== Bell arrangement ===
The bells are arranged as a full circle ring.

Bells at St John the Baptist, Lustleigh
Bell	Weight	Note
1	3 long tons 3 cwt 23 qr (7,700 lb or 3.49 t)	E
2	4 long tons 2 cwt 15 qr (9,600 lb or 4.36 t)	D
3	5 long tons 3 cwt 25 qr (12,240 lb or 5.55 t)	C
4	7 long tons 0 cwt 15 qr (16,100 lb or 7.3 t)	B
5	8 long tons 2 cwt 6 qr (18,310 lb or 8.31 t)	A
6	8 long tons 2 cwt 6 qr (18,310 lb or 8.31 t)	G

== Building status ==
The church is listed at Grade I as a building of exceptional interest. The Lychgate and perimeter wall around the churchyard, the Lantern on the Churchyard Wall, as well as the Old Vestry are all listed at Grade II.

The graveyard at the church is registered with Commonwealth War Graves Commission and contains the remains of three soldiers, all from the First World War.
