= Lilian Jane Gould =

British biologist (1861–1936)

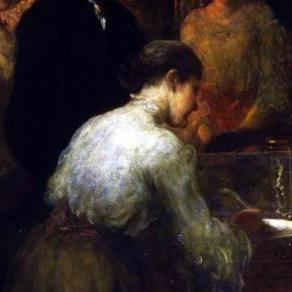
- Gould signing the membership book of the Linnaean Society
- Born: Lilian Jane Gould; 19 February 1861; England
- Died: 2 December 1936 (aged 75)
- Education: Somerville College, Oxford
- Spouse: Victor Herbert Veley
- Awards: Fellow of the Linnean Society
- Scientific career
- Fields: Natural Sciences

Lilian Jane Gould (1861–1936), also known as Lilian J. Veley, was a British biologist mainly known for her studies of microorganisms in liquor. She was one of the first women admitted to the Linnaean Society. Apart from her scientific work, she was one of the first European breeders of Siamese cats.

== Biography ==
Lilian Jane Gould was born on 19 February 1861, to Katharine Emma Gould and the Rev. J. Nutcombe. She attended Somerville College, Oxford on a scholarship, where her adviser was the entomologist Edward Bagnall Poulton. In 1894 she obtained a First Class degree in Natural Sciences, with a specialisation in animal morphology. In 1895 she married Victor Herbert Veley (1856–1933), a scientist and businessman with whom she would later collaborate on several research projects. Like other Oxford University women scientists of the era who were barred from obtaining a doctorate at Oxford, she later received a D.Sc. degree from Trinity College, Dublin (1905).

In 1904, she became one of the first women elected to the Linnean Society of London.

During World War I, Gould served as the commandant of a London unit of the British Red Cross.

Her husband died in 1933 and Gould died on 2 December 1936. An obituary was published in the Proceedings of the Linnaean Society.

=== Research ===
Gould wrote her first two scientific papers while still at Oxford University; one was on colour in the larvae of lepidoptera, while the other was on an amoeba, Pelomyxa palustris.

Veley was a scientist and the director of the Baddow Brewery Company, and Gould worked with him on microorganisms found in liquors such as rum. With Veley, she published several brief papers on the subject in Nature and elsewhere, as well as a book entitled The Micro-Organism of Faulty Rum (1898). Her husband's obituary opined that the book had received less attention than it deserved.

=== Cat breeding ===
Gould also played a part in the early history of the modern breed of Siamese cat, becoming one of the first western Siamese breeders. In 1884, her brother Edward, who was Consul-General in Bangkok, brought a breeding pair of the cats back home as a gift for his sister. Gould's pair, named Pho and Mia, produced three Siamese kittens, and all five attracted attention the following year at the annual cat show at London's Crystal Palace. Gould would go on to co-found the Siamese Cat Club in 1901.

Some photographs of other types of cats owned by Gould are held in the UK National Archives. She also interviewed in 1910 a family in Putney who owned a cat claimed to have been stolen from a Japanese temple of which cats were traditional guards.

== See also ==
- Timeline of women in science
