= Cecil Torr =

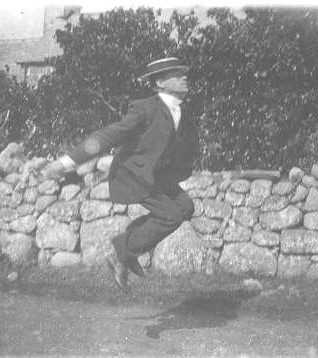
Picture of Cecil Torr in Scilly

Cecil Torr (11 October 1857, Mitcham, London – 17 December 1928) was a British antiquarian, barrister, and author.

== Early life ==
Torr was the son of John Smale Torr, a solicitor and Director of the Solicitors' and General Life Assurance Society, by his second wife Augusta Elizabeth King. He had a half-sister, Martha, and half-brother, Henry, both born to his father's first wife (and cousin), Maria, who had died after childbirth.

Cecil was educated at Harrow School, and later matriculated from Trinity College, Cambridge on 7 June 1876, graduating there B.A. 1880 and M.A. 1883.

He was admitted in 1879 at the Inner Temple and was called to the Bar on 12 June 1882.

== Works ==
Torr inherited the family property of the Wreyland estate, then technically part of the Bovey Tracey parish, but geographically and after 1929 administratively in Lustleigh, Dartmoor where his grandfather had lived and Torr often stayed at as a child, and took up a life of a country squire. The estate included Yonder Wreyland, where he lived, as well as the Hall House, Souther Wreyland, Bow Cottage, Barn House and a number of further buildings and grounds.

Torr travelled widely, including to Moscow, Damascus, Granada and Sparta, and collected over twenty artefacts now on display at The British Museum.

In 1905, Torr revived the tradition of Lustleigh May Day in the village, which continues to be held annually, with maypole dancing, morris dancing, and the attractions of a traditional English fete. He also donated a maypole to the nearby town of Bovey Tracey for their use.

He was a councillor for the Newton Abbot Rural District Council.

He is most noted for writing Small Talk at Wreyland (3 vols., 1918–1923); the first volume was originally published privately for himself and friends, but was an unexpected commercial success. The book was reviewed in the New Statesman which said "I do not know any book in which so many characteristic and uniformly good stories of Devonshire folk are to be found". In 1980, the book was featured with extracts read on the BBC Third Programme in 1948, and then decades later on BBC Radio 3 as part of their 1980 Christmas Day lineup.

His 1894 book Ancient Ships deals with the structure of ships that sailed the Mediterranean in 1000 B.C. – 1000 A.D.

== Selected publications ==
- Rhodes in Ancient Times. Cambridge University Press. 1885.
- Rhodes in Modern Times. Cambridge University Press. 1887.
- Ancient Ships. Cambridge University Press. 1894. Archived from the original on 10 December 2018.
- Interpretation of Greek music. 1896.
- Memphis and Mycenae: an examination of Egyptian chronology and its application to the early history of Greece. Cambridge University Press. 1896.
- On portraits of Christ in the British museum. 1898.
- Small Talk at Wreyland. Vol. I. Cambridge University Press. 1918.
- Small Talk at Wreyland. Vol. II. Cambridge University Press. 1921.
- Hannibal crosses the Alps. Cambridge University Press. 1924.
