= Teignbridge Hundred =

Ancient administrative unit of Devon, England

Teignbridge Hundred was the name of one of thirty two ancient administrative units of Devon, England. The hundred was listed in the Domesday survey of 1086 as comprising 34 settlements.

The parishes in the hundred were: Ashburton, Bickington, Bovey Tracey, Hennock, Highweek, Ideford, Ilsington, Kingsteignton, Lustleigh, Manaton, Moretonhampstead, North Bovey and Teigngrace

== See also ==
- List of hundreds of England and Wales - Devon
