= James Grant (British Army officer, born 1778) =

British Army soldier and major-general (1778–1852)

Major-General James Grant CB
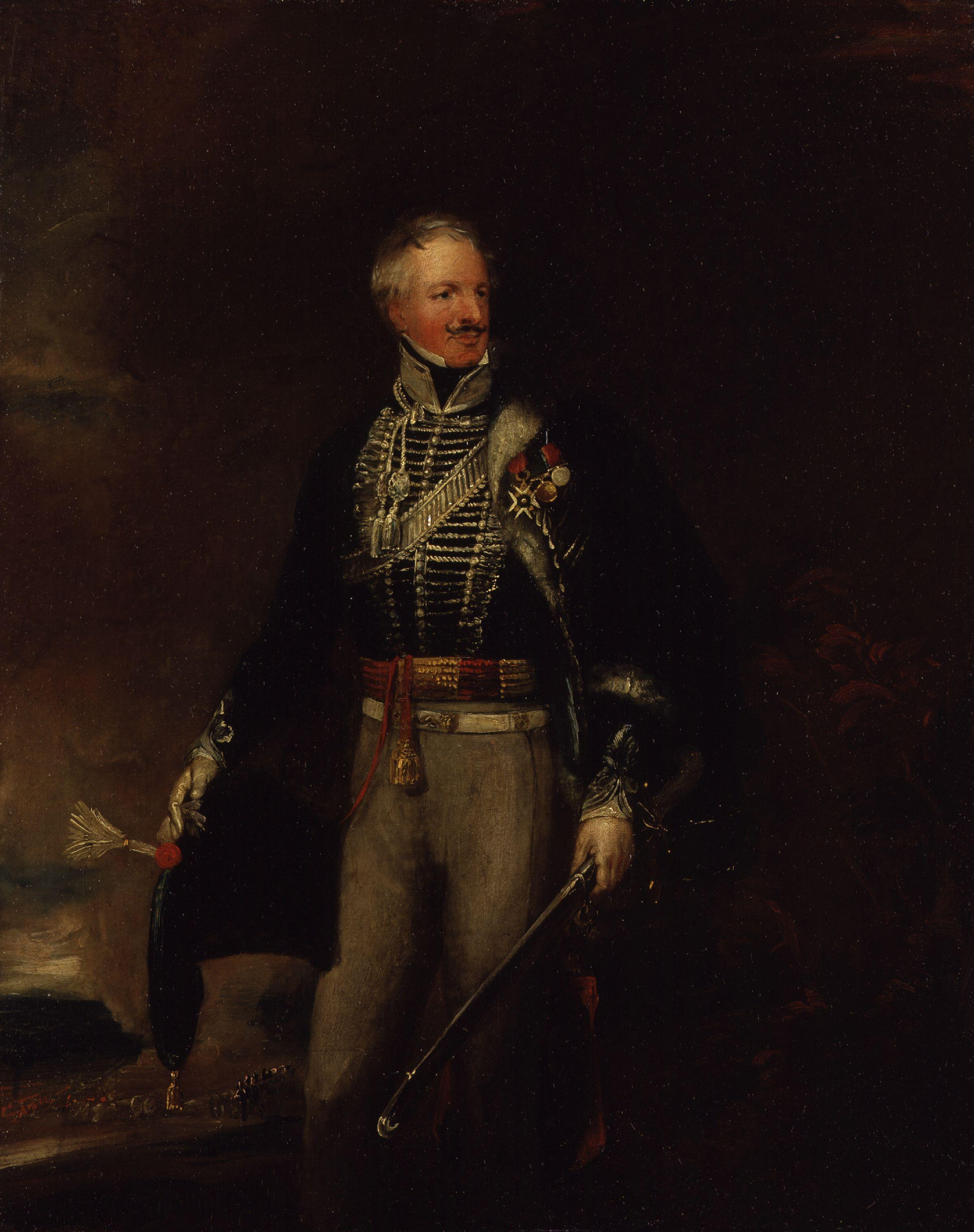
- Portrait by William Salter
- Born: 1778; Middlesex, England
- Died: 5 April 1852 (aged 74); Colham Green, Hillingdon, Middlesex, England
- Burial place: St Mary's Church, Hayes, Middlesex
- Spouse: Mary Penelope Blencowe (m. 1817)
- Military career
- Allegiance: Great Britain
- Branch: Army
- Service years: 1797–1852
- Rank: Major-General
- Conflicts: Fourth Anglo-Mysore War; Battle of Mallavelly; Battle of Seringapatam; Battle of Doondia; Napoleonic Wars; Battle of Maida; Battle of Toulouse; Battle of Waterloo
- Awards: CB

Major-General James Grant CB (1778 – 5 April 1852) was born in Middlesex about 1778, the son of James Grant of Dalvey, of the line of the Baronets Grant of Dalvey, Elgin, themselves an offshoot of Grant of Grant. His father was an official of the East India Company and served in India for many years before retiring to Vache Park, Buckinghamshire and later to Goldington Grange, Hertfordshire. His actual mother is not yet known, although his step-mother was Harriet Montagu, daughter of the 5th Earl of Sandwich.

== Army career ==
He joined the Army in 1797 and served 5 years in India with the 25th Regiment of Foot. He saw action at the Battle of Mallavelly, Siege of Seringapatam and at Doondia. At the storming of the fort of Turnioul, he volunteered and led the assault with fifty dismounted dragoons. Over the course of 3 years, he took part in the capture of more than 15 fortresses. By 1806, he was serving with the 21st Fusiliers during the Sicilian campaign, which concluded the War of the Third Coalition with the Battle of Maida. For 1807–1811, he returned to India with the 17th Light Dragoons. He returned to Europe in 1811 and joined the 18th Hussars, within the army under the Duke of Wellington. He saw action at the Battle of Toulouse and the Battle of Waterloo. He was promoted to Lieutenant-Colonel, with effect from the date of Waterloo. He married shortly afterwards and spent his time between France and Hillingdon, where he leased nearby Hayes Park House from 1829 to 1843. The extended Grant family appear several times in the autobiography of their neighbour, Anthony Trollope. Grant was promoted to Colonel in 1837 and to Major-General in 1846. He was appointed Governor of Scarborough Castle and was created Companion of The Most Honourable Order of the Bath (C.B.)

Throughout these years, he attended the annual 'Waterloo Banquet', hosted by the Duke of Wellington at Apsley House on the 18 June each year for soldiers who had fought with him at Waterloo. He was present at the 1851 Banquet. He died at his home in Colham Green, Hillingdon, Middlesex on the 5 April 1852, was buried at St Mary's Church, Hayes, and was remembered by his former comrades at the 1852 Waterloo Banquet, shortly ahead of the Duke's own death.

== Family ==
On 6 October 1817 at St Mary's Church, Hayes, Middlesex, he married:

Mary Penelope Blencowe (1795–1861), the daughter of Robert Willis Blencowe and his wife Penelope, née Robinson, with issue including:

1. Mary Grant (1819 St Omer, France – 1908 Kew, Surrey) who married William Dougal Christie in 1841
2. Anna Charlotte Grant (1820 Hayes, Middlesex – 5 Oct 1901 East Grinstead, Sussex), who married Peregrine Birch in 1843
3. Katherine Emma (Kate) Grant (1821 Paris, France – 1903 Devon), who married Rev. John Nutcombe Gould on 2 September 1841, and were the parents of James Nutcombe Gould, the famous actor
4. Henry James Grant (1823 Hillingdon, Middlesex – 1872 Charmouth, Bridport, Dorset), who never married
5. Charles P. Grant (b. 1826 Hillingdon, Middlesex – possibly died Exeter 1883)
6. Frances Charlotte Barbara Lily Grant (1828 Hillingdon, Middlesex – 10 Oct 1910 South Stoneham, Hampshire), who married Alfred Peter Lovekin in 1850
7. Charlotte Elizabeth Mary Grant (1830 Hayes, Middlesex – 1857 Hillingdon, Middlesex), who died unmarried
8. Owen Edward Grant (1831 Hillingdon, Middlesex – 18 Nov 1921 Chelsea, London), who married Adelaide Georgina Higginson in 1862
9. Montagu Henry Stewart (Monty) Grant (1838 Hayes, Middlesex – 1869 Buckinghamshire), who married Mary Statham in 1865

His widow died 18 February 1861 and was buried 25 February 1861 at St Margaret's Church, Uxbridge.
