= Edward Blencowe Gould =

British diplomat (1847–1916)

Edward Blencowe Gould (Stoke-in-Teignhead, Devon 9 August 1847 – Devon 16 November 1916) was British Consul in Bangkok, Thailand, and Consul-General in Alexandria, Egypt.

Gould was the first to bring Siamese cats to Europe in 1884 when he brought a pair back to Britain for his sister, Lilian Jane Gould, who went on to be co-founder of the Siamese Cat Club in 1901. The cats were shown at The Crystal Palace in 1885.

== Career ==
Gould started his career as a junior interpreter in Siam (now called Thailand) on 20 January 1868. Shortly after he became first, and later second, assistant on 1 May 1878. He became Consul in Siam on 27 November 1885 before being transferred to Port Said, Egypt on 13 August 1891 and then Consul General in Alexandria on 1 November 1897.

== Family ==
In 1895, he married Alice Elizabeth Gordon (1870–unknown). They had no children.

He retired on 3 November 1909, and died seven years later in 1916, aged 69, at his home in Devon.

His brother was the actor James Nutcombe Gould (1849–1899).
