= Fête =

Elaborate festival, party or celebration

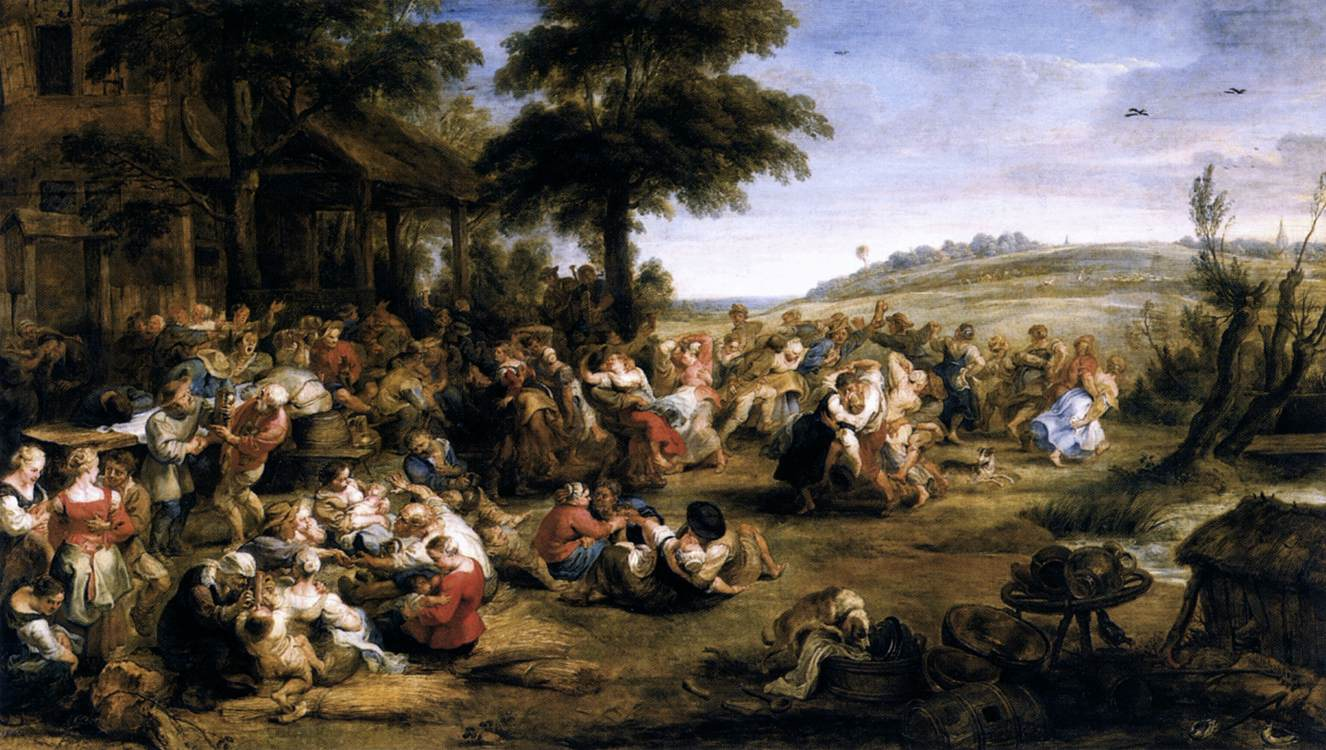
The Village Fête, by Rubens (c. 1635)

In the United Kingdom and some of its former colonies, a fête or fete is a public festival organised to raise money for a charity, typically held outdoors. It generally includes entertainment and the sale of goods and refreshments. Fêtes are typically held annually, in the summer months.

== Village fêtes ==
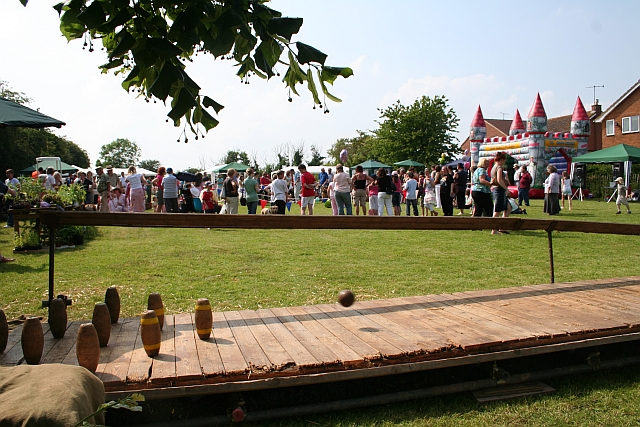
An English village fête in Longdon

Village fêtes are common in Britain. These are usually outdoor shows held on village greens or recreation grounds with a variety of activities. They are organised by an ad hoc committee of volunteers from organisations like religious groups or residents' associations. Fêtes can also be seen in former British colonies. In Australia, fêtes are often held yearly by schools and sometimes churches to raise funds.

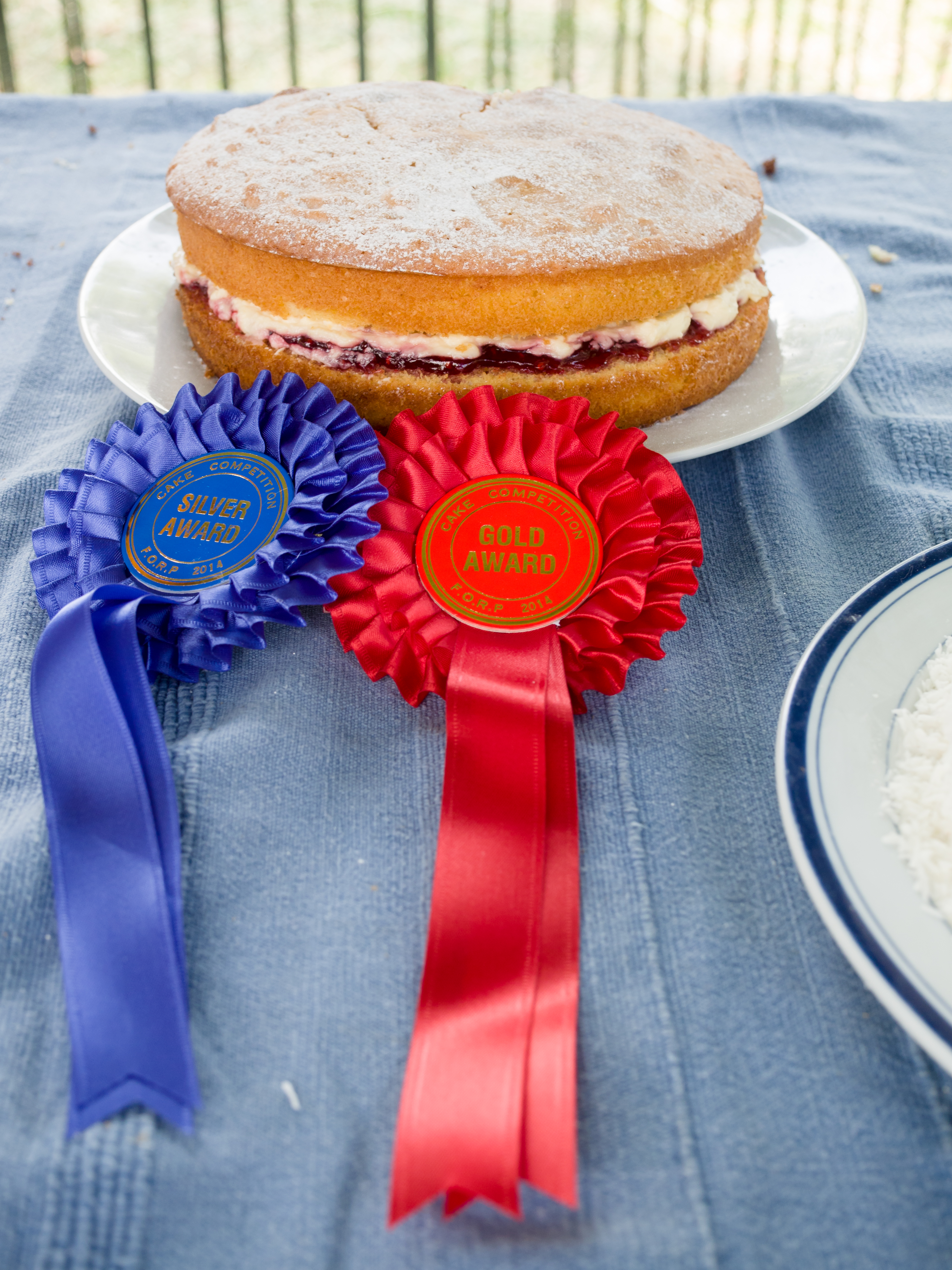
An award-winning Victoria sponge cake from Ruskin Park fête in London

Attractions seen at village fêtes include tombolas, raffles, bowling for a pig, coconut shies, bat a rat stalls, white elephant stalls, cakes, and home produce such as jams and pickles. Competitive baking, such as making Victoria sponge cake, is part of the classic British fête. Filmed in bunting-draped marquees in scenic gardens, The Great British Bake Off television series is inspired by the quintessential English village fête. Entertainment at fêtes may include Morris dancing, tug of war, fancy dress, and pet shows. The fête itself is a variation of a fair.

== Other types ==
In Trinidad and Tobago and other English-speaking Caribbean territories, fêtes are huge parties held during the Carnival season.

Harvard University's Eliot House uses the term to refer to its spring formal. The Independence Day celebration in Bloomington, Minnesota, traditionally held on 3 July, has been known as Summer Fete since 1978.

In Australia, fêtes are typically held by primary schools and other not-for-profit organisations (e.g. the local Seniors' Club, church groups) as fundraisers.

== Etymology ==
The English word fête, pronounced /ˈfeɪt/ FAYT or /ˈfɛt/ FET, is borrowed from the Mediaeval Latin festus via the French fête, meaning "holiday" or "party". The 12th-century Middle English root fest- is shared with feast, festive, festal and festival, festoon, Festivus, the Spanish fiesta, Portuguese festa, etc. and the proper name Festus.

== See also ==
- Kermesse
- Village Fête, a painting by Claude Lorrain
