= Gidleigh Castle =

Ruined manor house in Devon, England

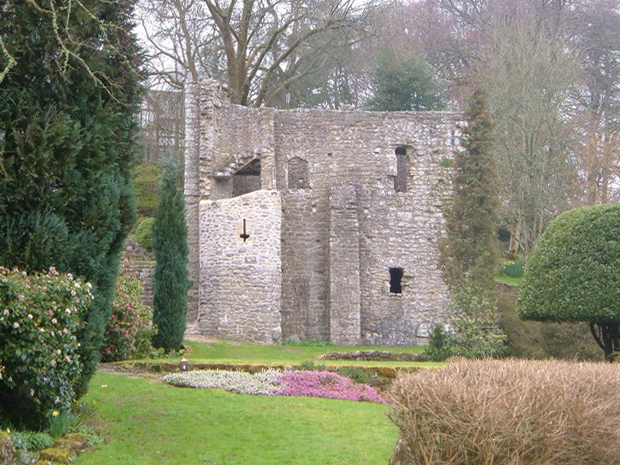
- Gidleigh Castle, 2006

- Location within Devon
- 50.68027°N 3.88342°W

Scheduled monument
- Official name: Gidleigh Castle (remains of)
- Designated: 13 November 1963
- Reference no.: 1004603

Listed Building – Grade I
- Official name: Gidleigh Castle
- Designated: 22 February 1967
- Reference no.: 1308353

Gidleigh Castle was the manor house of the manor of Gidleigh on the north-eastern edge of Dartmoor, about two miles (3.2 km) north-west of the town of Chagford, Devon, England.

== History ==
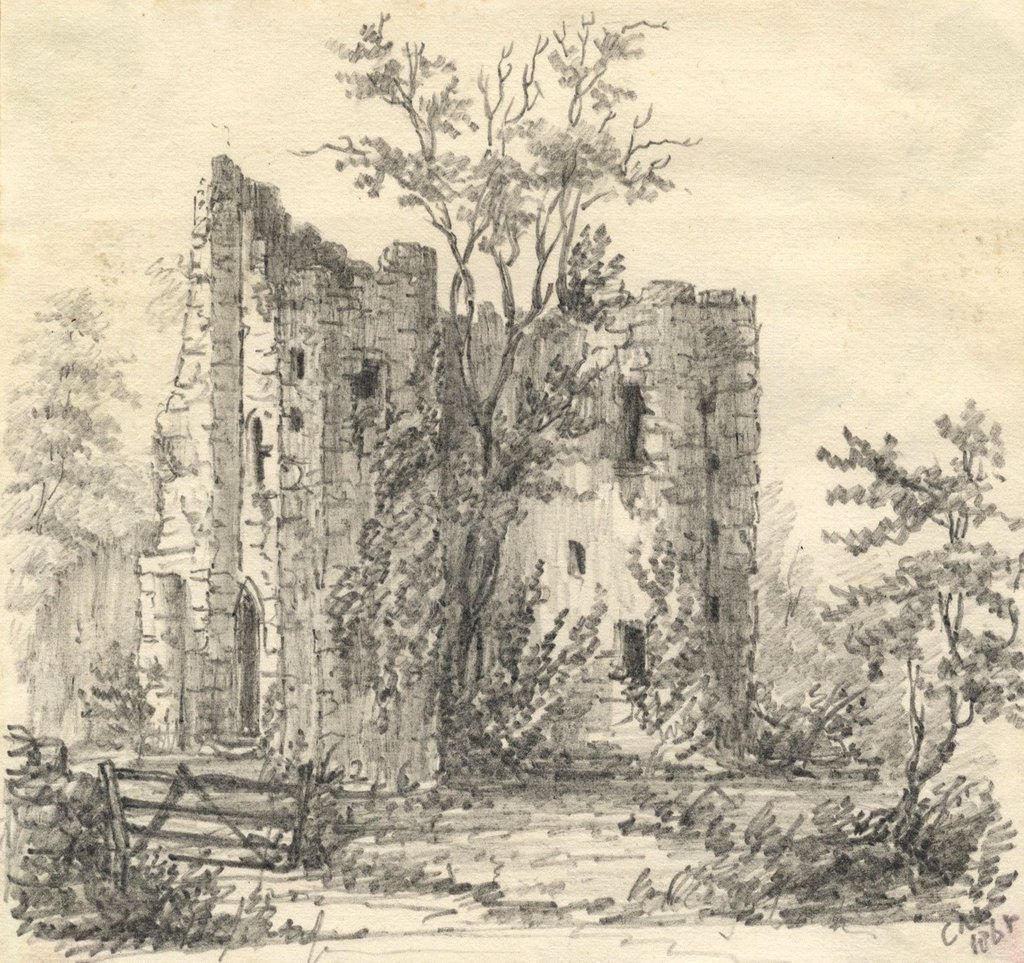
Gidleigh Castle, 1868 drawing by C. A. Collis

The Prouz family had held the manor of Gidleigh from at least the later half of the 12th century. The castle was probably built by Sir William Prouz, the last of the senior male line of the family. He died in 1316, leaving a sole daughter and heiress Alice Prouz (1286–1335), who married Sir Roger de Moels (died 1323), thought to have been brother of John de Moels, 1st Baron Moels. By Roger, Alice left three daughters and co-heiresses who divided Alice's extensive inheritance, including Gidleigh manor and its castle. Gidley would pass to one of these, Alice de Moels, wife of John Daumarle (Damerell).

Some time after the ca. 1393 death of Sir John Daumarle, Alice de Moels' son, his inheritance including the manor of Gidleigh and thus its castle was claimed by Joan (née Cokyn), a granddaughter of his sister and wife of John Dernford, alias Carnadon. She, in turn, left a sole daughter and heiress upon her death in 1454, who took the inheritance to the Coode family of Morval. Henry Battishill held the manor in 1631. Bartholomew Gidley bought it in 1683 and used some of the stone from the castle, which had probably already been by then derelict for over a century, to build a new house, Castle House, nearby. The property remained in the Gidley family until 1772 when Henry Rattray became Lord of the Manor through marriage. After his death in 1795 the manor passed to Rev. Arthur Whipham, and in 1912 the castle was the property of Arthur's grandson, A. Guy Whipham, who lived at the nearby Gidleigh Park.

== Structure ==
Although the structure has been known as a castle since at least the 17th century, when William Pole referred to it as such, it is now considered to have been a fortified manor house rather than a true castle. Its position on a slope would have been hard to defend and the only features that indicate strength are the six-foot-thick buttressed walls and the slots in the doorways intended for draw bars. The architectural details of Gidleigh Castle are very similar to those of the contemporaneous rebuilding of the richer Courtenay family's Okehampton Castle, six miles to the north-west, and Gidleigh was probably conceived in imitation of that family. The same master mason may have been responsible for both buildings and both made use of the sandy dolomite rock from a series of small quarries south of Hatherleigh.

All that survives of the castle today is a small, ruined keep tower with an undercroft and a hall or solar above. A stairway within the west and south walls links the two, and there was also an external newel stairway (now mostly collapsed) on the east wall. A fireplace in the hall has been much altered; it is flanked by two windows, one with seats. It is not clear whether there was a timber or less strongly built stone hall to the north: evidence is provided by a doorway in that wall and large projecting stones on the outside.

Until around 1890 the ruins were quite stable, but by 1918 levelling of the ground for the garden of a new house had undercut the foundations, causing the collapse of the turret stairway and the entrance arch, and much other damage. The state of the surviving ruins was assessed by the Government's Department of the Environment in 1960. Subsequent reports led to repair and consolidation work in the 1990s and 2000s. The ruins have been a listed building since 1967, at Grade I, being "of exceptional interest".
