= Bowling for a pig =

British carnival game

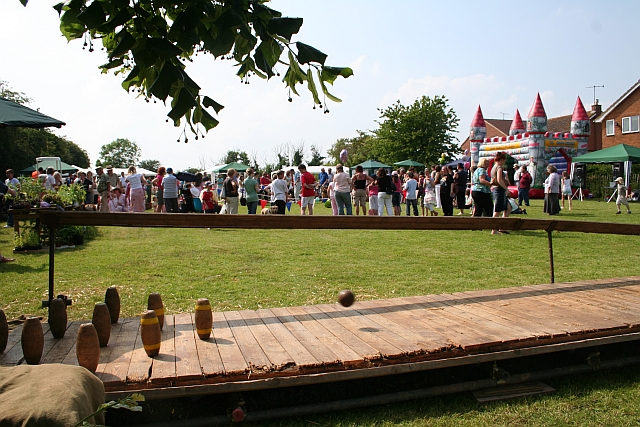
Bowling under way at an English village fête in Longdon, Staffordshire

Bowling for a pig was a traditional British competition, usually held at country fêtes, fairs, and carnivals. It was a form of bowling as a test of skill, with the highest scorer(s) winning the prize. The traditional prize was a live pig to take home. The game traditionally used nine wooden pins at the end of an alley, and a solid wooden ball. It was common through the 19th and 20th centuries. Some fêtes retain the name for their bowling sideshow, but no longer offer a live pig as a prize.

== Prize ==
The traditional prize was a piglet for the winner to take home and raise. The pig was seen as a very valuable prize, given the importance of fresh meat in contemporary diets, and pork being the only meat that most families would ever eat.

The practice of winning a live pig led to the phrase "bringing home the bacon", relating to winning bacon, and latterly to gaining things of value.

Some fairs used other animals, such as bowling for a lamb. As fewer people kept livestock, some fairs started to offer joints of pork as the prize instead of a live animal, and some fairs continue the name today but have substituted other prizes.
