= Hennock =

Village in Devon, England

Coordinates: 50.614830°N 3.6529289°W

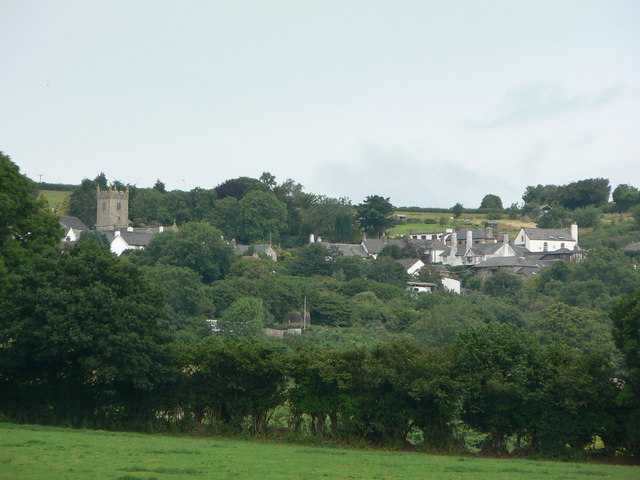

- Location within Devon
- Area: 15.9844 km^{2} (6.1716 sq mi)
- Population: 1,747 (2011 census)
  - Density: 109/km^{2} (280/sq mi)
- Civil parish: Hennock
- District: Teignbridge
- Shire county: Devon
- Region: South West
- Country: England
- Sovereign state: United Kingdom
- Post town: Newton Abbot
- Postcode district: TQ13
- Police: Devon and Cornwall
- Fire: Devon and Somerset
- Ambulance: South Western
- UK Parliament: Central Devon
- Website: www.hennock.org.uk

Hennock is a village and civil parish about 3 miles west north west of Chudleigh, in the Teignbridge district, in the county of Devon, England. In 2011 the parish had a population of 1747. The parish touches Bovey Tracey, Kingsteignton, Christow, Chudleigh and Trusham.

== Features ==
Hennock has a primary school. There are 47 listed buildings in Hennock.

== History ==
The name "Hennock" means 'At the high oak-tree'. Hennock was recorded in the Domesday Book as Hanoch/Hainoc. The parish was historically in the Teignbridge hundred. On the 25th of March 1885 an area of the parish was transferred to the parish of Bovey Tracey. The transferred area contained 8 houses in 1891.
