= Marshwood Castle =

- Marshwood, Dorset, United Kingdom

Site information
- Type: Castle
- Owner: Private ownership
- Open to the public: No
- Condition: Ruined

Location
- The castle within Dorset
- Coordinates: 50.7757°N 2.8458°W

Site history
- Built: 1205–1215
- Events

Scheduled monument
- Official name: Marshwood Castle
- Designated: 30 August 1960; 65 years ago
- Reference no.: 1002836

Marshwood Castle was a motte-and-bailey castle in Marshwood, Dorset, within the Vale of Marshwood. It was built by William de Mandeville following his elevation to Baron Marshwood in 1205 by King John, and is first recorded as a built castle in 1215. The castle is no longer standing, but ruins remain and they are a scheduled monument.

== Honour of Marshwood ==
The castle was the Head of the Honour and Barony of Mandeville of Marshwood (usually referred to as the Honour of Marshwood), which had extensive land holdings across the South West.

== Remains ==
The remains of the castle are within the working Lodge House Farm, with barns and agricultural buildings encroaching on the earthworks. There remains the lower walls of a fortified house, which might date from the 1350s – 1360s.

There are also various other remains around the site, including the former St Mary's Chapel, and various earthworks and buildings.

== Designation ==
The remains of the castle are a scheduled monument.

The specific walls of the fortified house are listed at Grade II*.

The castle appears on the Heritage at Risk Register.
