= Widworthy =

Village in Devon, England

Coordinates: 50.788°N 3.111°W

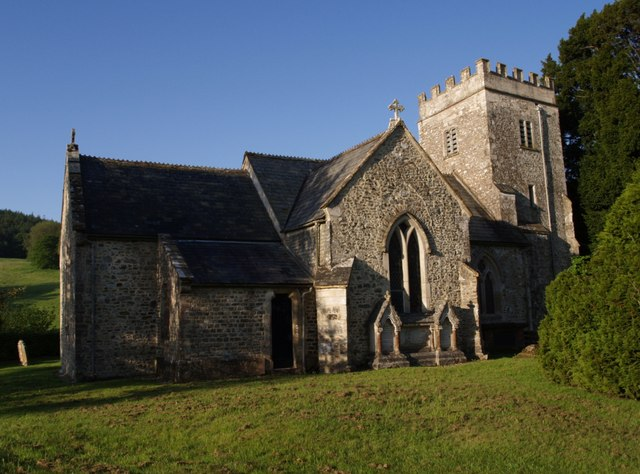
- St Cuthbert's Church, Widworthy

- Location within Devon
- Population: 296 (2011 census)
- Civil parish: Widworthy
- District: East Devon
- Shire county: Devon
- Region: South West
- Country: England
- Sovereign state: United Kingdom

Widworthy is a village, parish and former manor in East Devon, Devon, England. The village is 3 1/2 miles east of Honiton and the parish is surrounded clockwise from the north by the parishes of Stockland (a short boundary only), Dalwood, Shute, Colyton, Northleigh, and Offwell. The parish church is dedicated to St Cuthbert. Near the church is Widworthy Barton, the former manor house, which is largely unaltered from its early 17th century form. Widworthy Court is a mansion within the parish built in 1830 by Sir Edward Marwood-Elton to the design of G.S. Repton. In 2011 the parish had a population of 296.

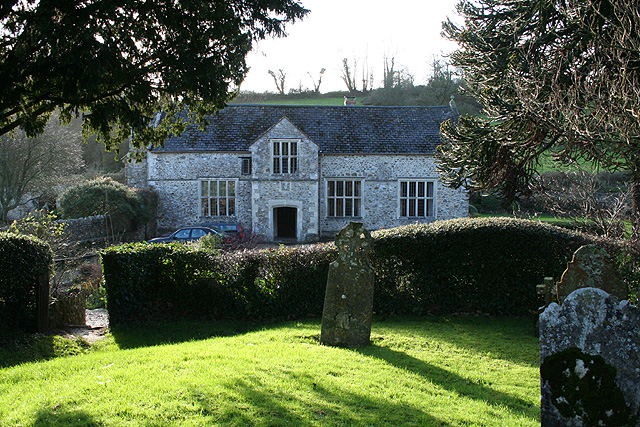
Widworthy Barton

== History ==
The Domesday Book of 1086 lists Widworthy among the 27 Devonshire holdings of Theobald FitzBerner, one of the tenants-in-chief in Devon of King William the Conqueror. His tenant was a certain Oliver. His lands later formed part of the feudal barony of Great Torrington. At some time in the 13th century, John de Umfraville held the feudal barony, and had his own tenant at Widworthy. The earliest lord of the manor recorded by the Devon historian Sir William Pole (died 1635) was Sir William de Widworthy.

The manor was later inherited by the Wotton family. The last in the male line was John Wotton who left a daughter and heiress Alice Wotton, who married Sir John Chichester (1385-1437), lord of the manor of Raleigh. The manor was still in the Chichester family in the early 17th century, being then held by Hugh, according to Pole.
