= The Village Fête (Rubens) =

Painting by Peter Paul Rubens

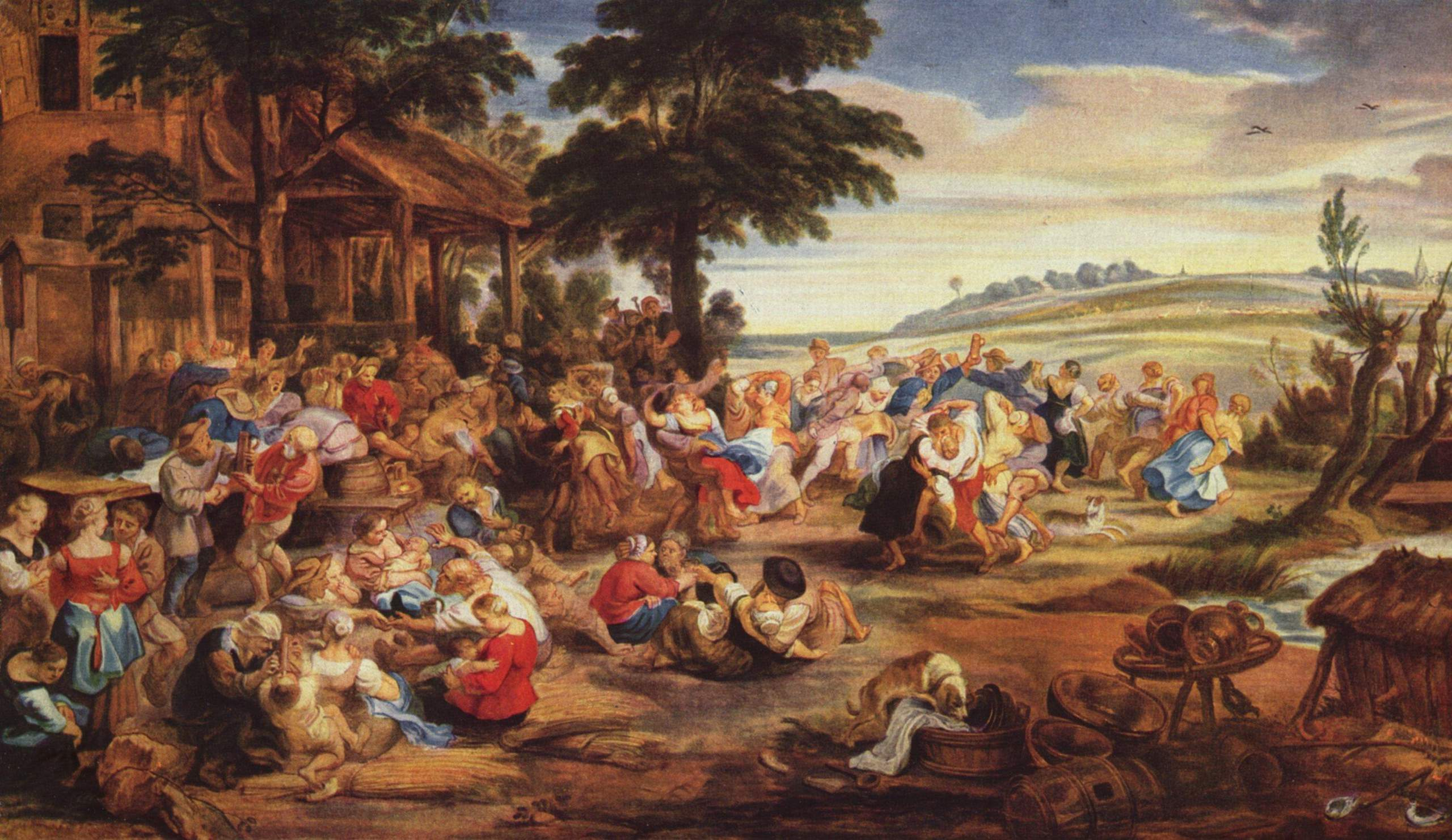
The Village Fête (1635–1638) by Rubens

The Village Fête, La Kermesse or Noce de village. is a painting by Peter Paul Rubens, created in 1635–1638, now in the Louvre Museum. It shows a 'kermesse' or village festivity.
