= May Day =

Festival marking the beginning of summer

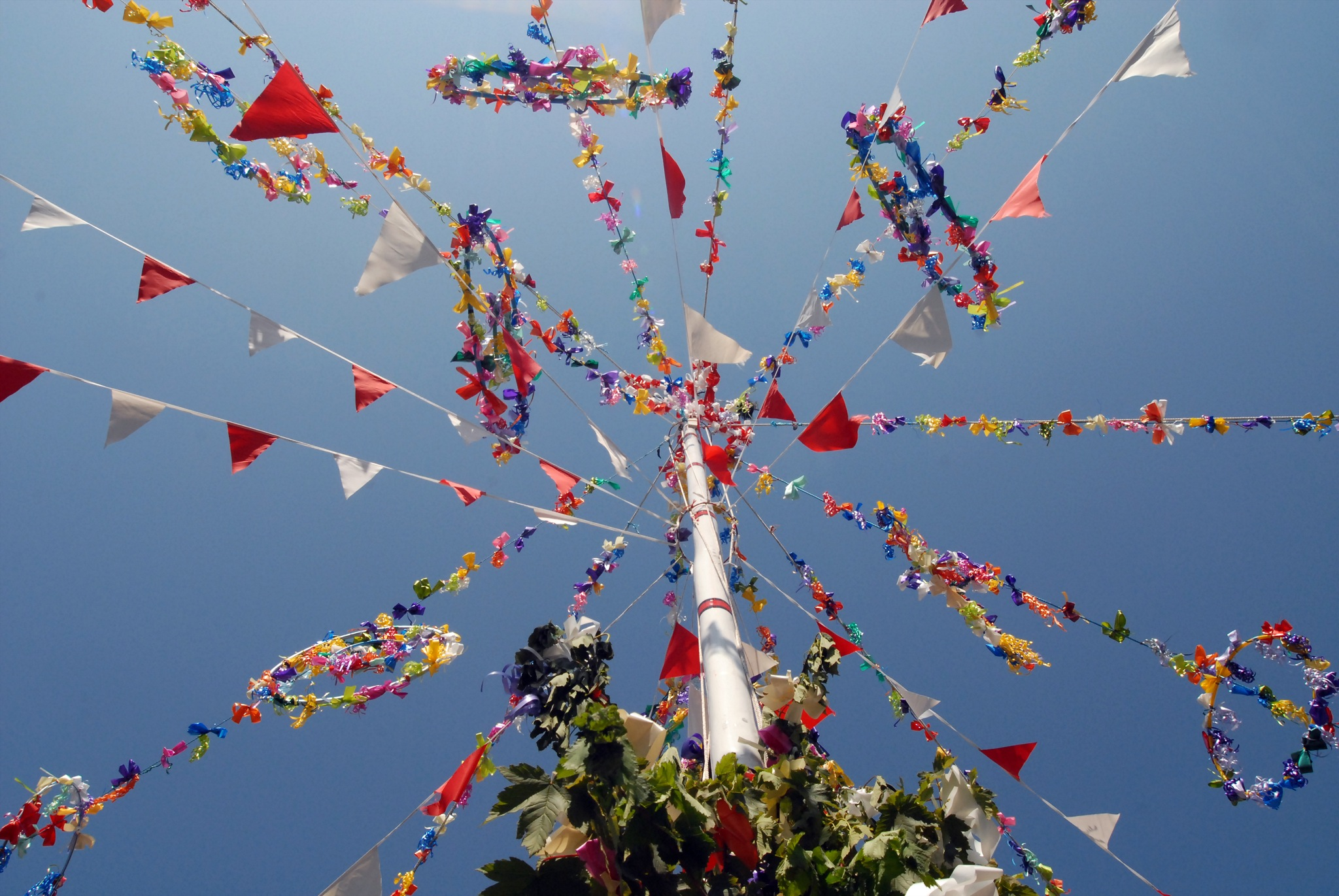
- A Maypole decorated on May Day in Padstow, Cornwall
- Type: Cultural
- Significance: European festival of ancient origins marking the beginning of summer
- Celebrations: Raising and decorating Maypoles, decorating buildings with green branches and flowers, crowning a May Queen, Jack in the Green, bonfires, feasting, dancing, singing, processions
- Date: May 1

May Day is a European festival of ancient origins marking the beginning of summer, usually celebrated on May 1, around halfway between the Northern Hemisphere's spring equinox and midsummer solstice. Festivities may also be held the night before, known as May Eve. Traditions include gathering green branches and wildflowers ("bringing in the May"), which are used to decorate buildings and made into wreaths; crowning a May Queen, sometimes with a male companion decked in greenery; setting up a Maypole, May Tree, or May Bush, around which people dance and sing; as well as parades and processions involving these. Bonfires are also a major part of the festival in some regions. Regional varieties and related traditions include Walpurgis Night in central and northern Europe, the Gaelic festival Beltane, the Welsh festival Calan Mai, and May devotions to the Blessed Virgin Mary. It has also been associated with the ancient Roman festival Floralia.

Labour Day (or International Workers' Day), observed in many countries on 1 May, is also called "May Day": however, the two have different histories.

== Origins and celebrations ==
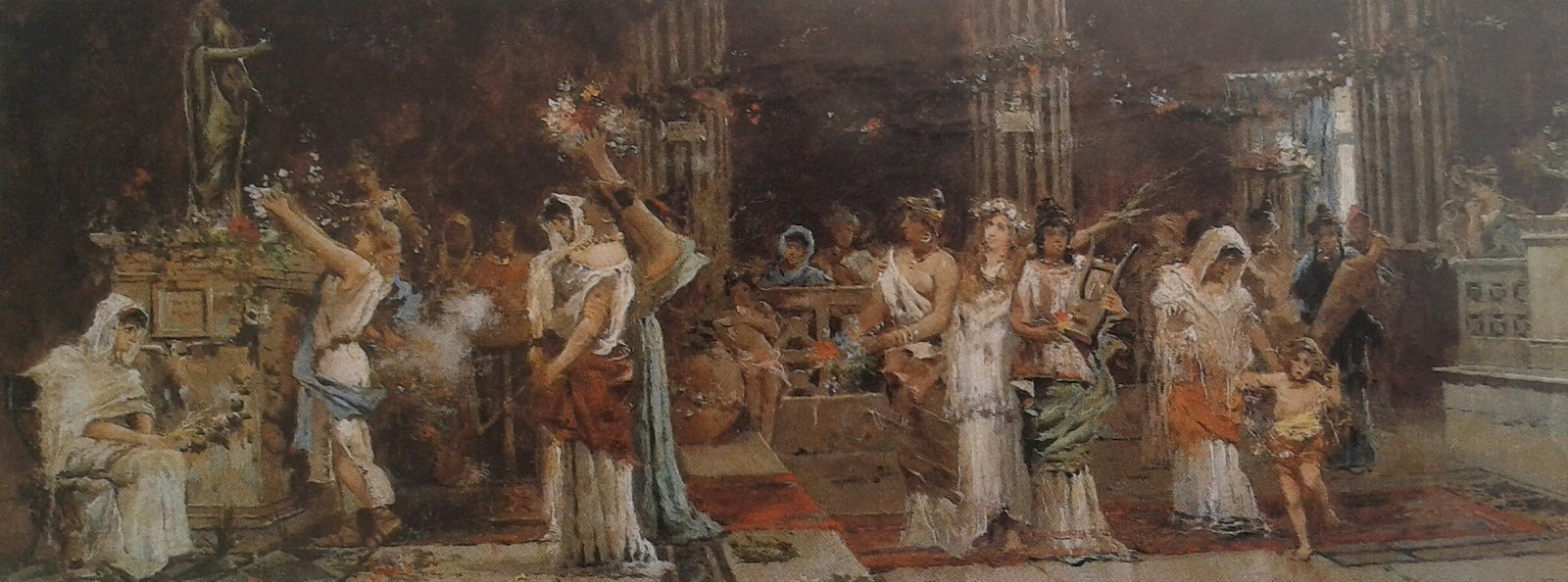
Floralia by Antonio María Reyna Manescau (1888)

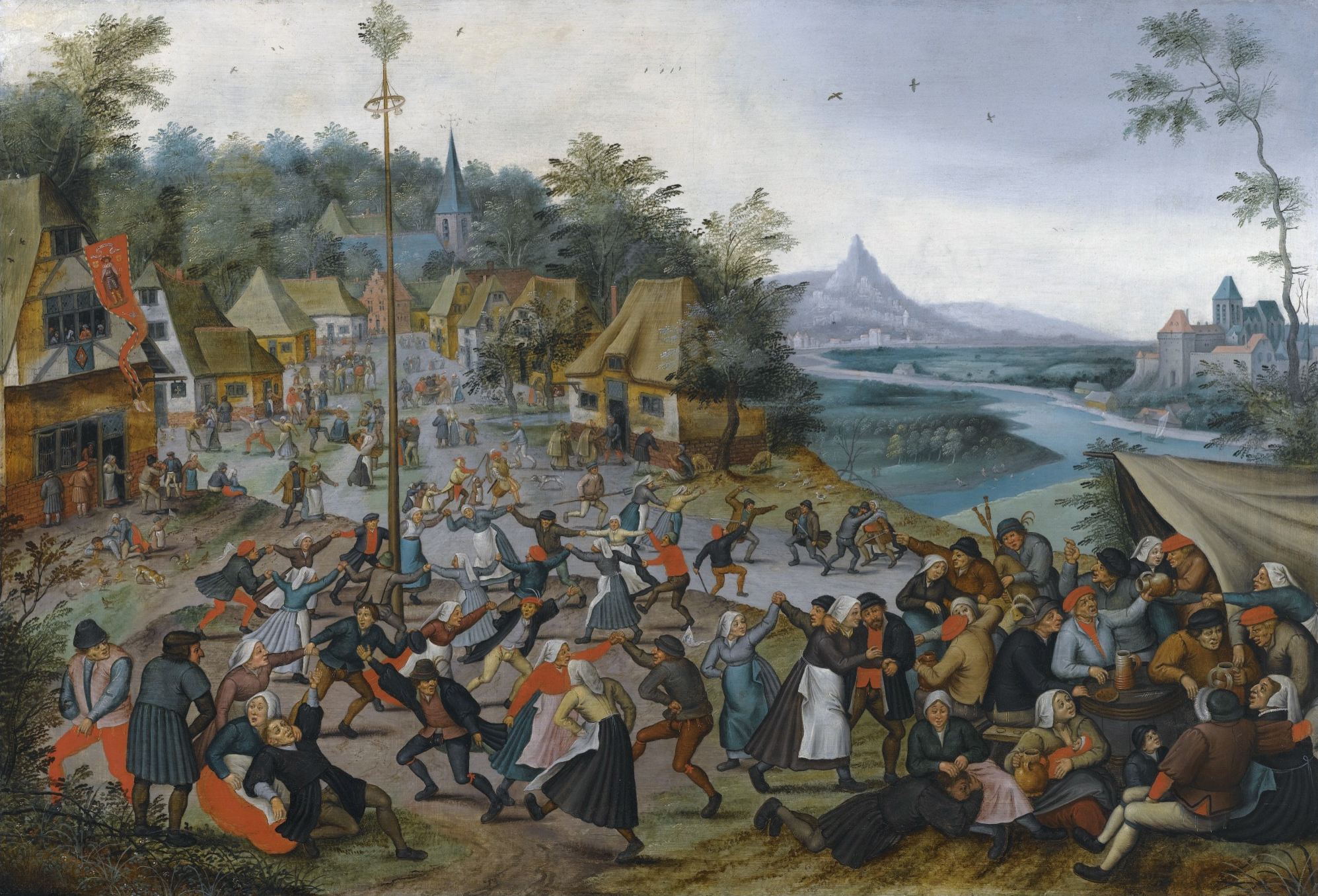
Maypole dancing in the Netherlands, by Pieter Brueghel the Younger (16th century)

The earliest known May celebrations appeared with the Floralia, festival of Flora, the Roman goddess of flowers, held from 27 April to 3 May during the Roman Republic era, and the Maiouma or Maiuma, a festival celebrating Dionysus and Aphrodite held every three years during the month of May. The Floralia opened with theatrical performances. In the Floralia, Ovid says that hares and goats were released as part of the festivities. Persius writes that crowds were pelted with vetches, beans, and lupins. A ritual called the Florifertum was performed on either 27 April or 3 May, during which a bundle of wheat ears was carried into a shrine, though it is not clear if this devotion was made to Flora or Ceres. Floralia concluded with competitive events and spectacles, and a sacrifice to Flora.

Maiouma was celebrated at least as early as the 2nd century AD, when records show expenses for the month-long festival were appropriated by Emperor Commodus. According to the 6th-century chronicles of John Malalas, the Maiouma was a "nocturnal dramatic festival, held every three years and known as Orgies, that is, the Mysteries of Dionysus and Aphrodite" and that it was "known as the Maioumas because it is celebrated in the month of May-Artemisios". During this time, enough money was set aside by the government for torches, lights, and other expenses to cover a 30-day festival of "all-night revels". The Maiouma was celebrated with splendorous banquets and offerings. Its reputation for licentiousness caused it to be suppressed during the reign of Emperor Constantine, though a less debauched version of it was briefly restored during the reigns of Arcadius and Honorius, only to be suppressed again during the same period.

During the Middle Ages, May Eve was celebrated in much of northern Europe with the lighting of bonfires at night. In the Germanic countries, this became Walpurgis Night, commemorating the official canonization of Saint Walpurga on 1 May 870. It continued the tradition of lighting bonfires. Folklorist Jack Santino says "Her day and its traditions almost certainly are traceable to pre-Christian celebrations that took place at this time". In Gaelic culture, 1 May was the celebration of Beltaine or Cétshamhain, while for the Welsh it was Calan Mai or Cyntefin. First attested in 900 AD, the celebration mainly focused on the symbolic use of fire to bless cattle and other livestock as they were moved to summer pastures. This custom continued into the early 19th century, during which time cattle would be made to jump over fires to protect their milk from being stolen by fairies. People would also leap over the fires for luck.

Since the 18th century, many Roman Catholics have observed May – and May Day – with various May devotions to the Blessed Virgin Mary. In works of art, school skits, and so forth, Mary's head will often be adorned with flowers in a May crowning. 1 May is also one of two feast days of the Catholic patron saint of workers St Joseph the Worker, a carpenter, husband to Mother Mary, and foster father of Jesus. Replacing another feast to St. Joseph, this date was chosen by Pope Pius XII in 1955 as a counterpoint to the communist International Workers' Day celebrations on May Day.

The best known modern May Day traditions, observed both in Europe and North America, include dancing around the maypole and crowning the Queen of May. Fading in popularity since the late 20th century is the tradition of giving of "May baskets", small baskets of sweets or flowers, usually left anonymously on neighbours' doorsteps.

In the late 20th century, many neopagans began reconstructing some of the older pagan festivals and combining them with more recently developed European secular and Catholic traditions, and celebrating May Day as a pagan religious festival.

== Germanic regions ==
=== Germany ===
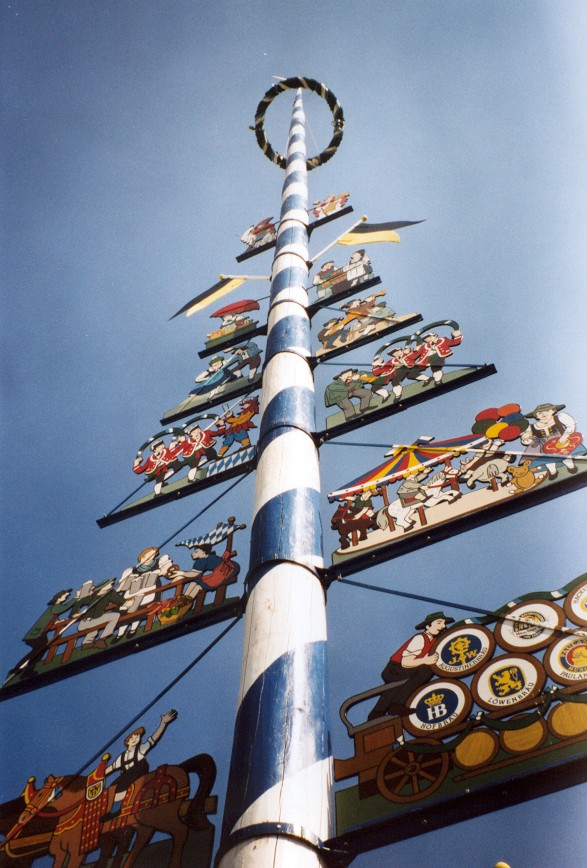
Maibaum in Munich, Germany

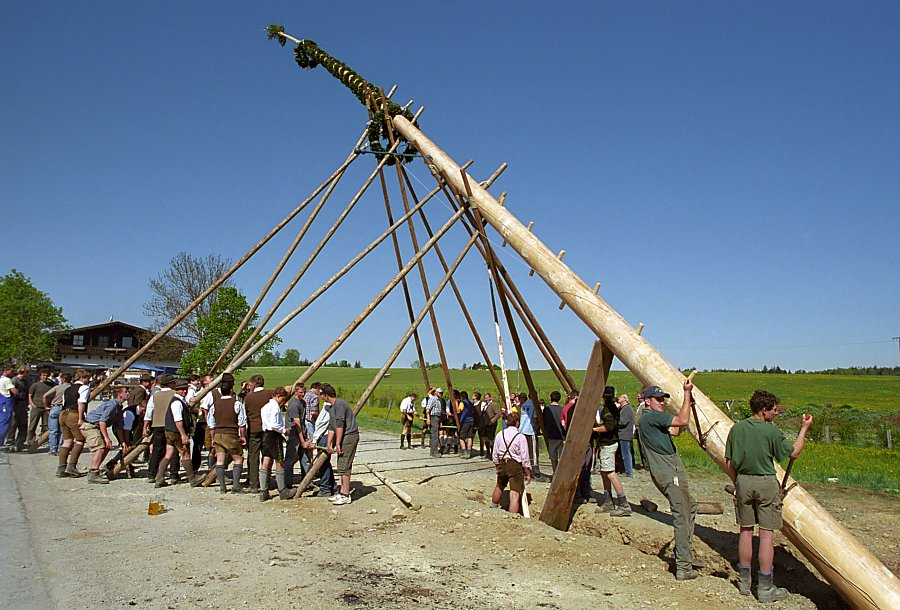
Maibaum in Bad Tölz, Germany

In rural regions of Germany, especially the Harz Mountains, Walpurgisnacht celebrations are traditionally held on the night before May Day, including bonfires and the wrapping of a Maibaum (maypole). Young people use this opportunity to party, while the day itself is used by many families to get some fresh air. Motto: "Tanz in den Mai" ("Dance into May").

In the Rhineland, 1 May is also celebrated by the delivery of a maypole, a tree covered in streamers to the house of a girl the night before. The tree is typically from a love interest, though a tree wrapped only in white streamers is a sign of dislike. Women usually place roses or rice in the form of a heart at the house of their beloved one. It is common to stick the heart to a window or place it in front of the doormat. In leap years, it is the responsibility of the women to place the maypole. All the action is usually done secretly and it is an individual's choice whether to give a hint of their identity or stay anonymous.

=== Tyrol ===
In The Golden Bough: A Study in Magic and Religion, Sir James George Frazer reported May Day customs in Tyrol during the 19th century. It was a time for banishing evil powers from the community. On the last three days of April, all houses were fumigated with juniper and rue incense. At sunset on May Day, the people held a ceremony they called "burning out the witches". The church bells were rung and people made as much noise as possible by shouting, banging pots and pans, ringing bells and cracking whips. Men carried lighted bundles of herbs fasted on poles, while women carried censers. Then they would run seven times round the houses and the village, so that the witches would be "smoked out of their lurking-places and driven away".

=== Sweden ===
In Sweden, there are bonfires and outdoor celebrations on May Eve or Walpurgis Night ("Valborgsmässoafton") in the evening of 30 April. Most of the traditions associated elsewhere with May Day are held at Midsummer instead; such as Maypole dancing.

Up until the 19th century, on May Day itself, there were mock battles between Summer and Winter. Sir James George Frazer wrote in The Golden Bough (1911):

on May Day two troops of young men on horseback used to meet as if for mortal combat. One of them was led by a representative of Winter clad in furs, who threw snowballs and ice in order to prolong the cold weather. The other troop was commanded by a representative of Summer covered with fresh leaves and flowers. In the sham fight which followed the party of Summer came off victorious, and the ceremony ended with a feast

== Celtic regions ==
=== Ireland ===
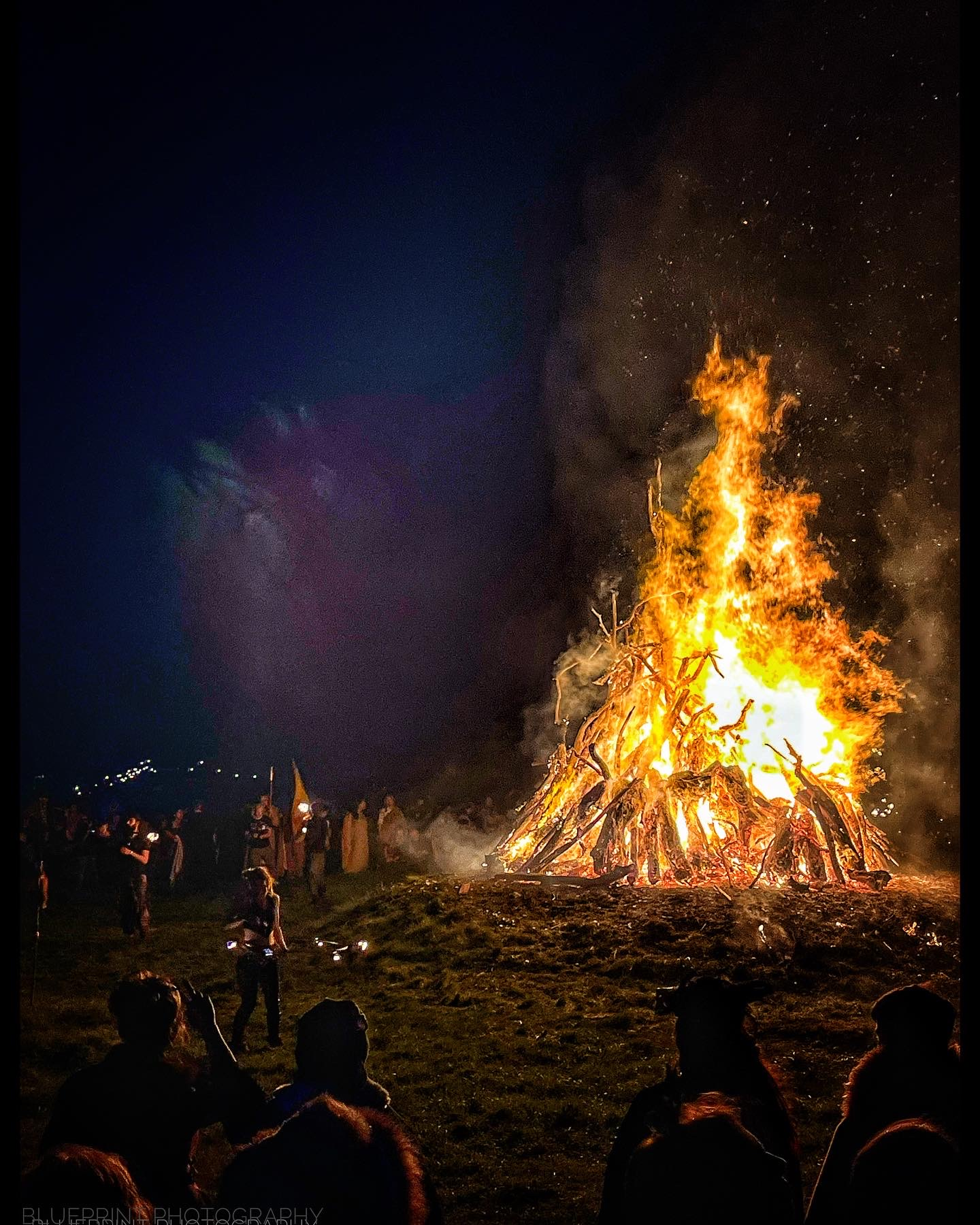
Bealtaine bonfire at Uisneach in Ireland, 2022

In Ireland, May Day has long been celebrated as the festival of Bealtaine. It marks the beginning of summer and historically was when cattle were driven out to the summer pastures. Rituals were performed to protect cattle, people and crops, and to encourage growth. Special bonfires were kindled, whose flames, smoke and ashes were deemed to have protective powers. The people and their cattle would walk around or between bonfires, and sometimes leap over the flames or embers. All household fires would be doused and then re-lit from the Bealtaine bonfire. These gatherings would be accompanied by a feast, and some of the food and drink would be offered to the aos sí, the 'spirits' or 'fairies'. Doors, windows, byres and cattle would be decorated with yellow May flowers, perhaps because they evoked fire. In parts of Ireland, people would make a May Bush: typically a thorn bush or branch decorated with flowers, ribbons, bright shells and rushlights. Holy wells were also visited, while Bealtaine dew was thought to bring beauty and maintain youthfulness.

For almost two centuries, the Dublin suburb of Finglas was well known for its "May Games" and its maypole "was one of the last to survive in Dublin", according to historian Michael J. Tutty.

Throughout the eighteenth century, the Finglas maypole was at the centre of a week of festivity which included "the playing of games, various competitions, and, according to one account the crowning of 'Queen of the May'." In a letter written by Major Sirr on 2 May 1803 (shortly after the turbulent 1798 Rebellion), he writes:

Godfrey and I went to Finglass and found everything in order. Major Wilkinson, who resides, there, waited upon me... and told me there was not the smallest occasion for military aid nor was there the least possibility of any disturbance... I ordered the guard to return to Dublin and these gentlemen and their families seemed quite rejoiced that the old custom of Maying was not to be interrupted in Finglass where that amusement has been kept up for a century past without ever being curbed before.

Public celebrations of Bealtaine fell out of popularity by the 20th century and many old traditions are no longer widely observed. The tradition of a May Bush was reported as being suppressed by law and the magistrates in Dublin in the 18th century. The tradition of lighting bonfires has survived in parts of the country, and other traditions continue to be revived as local cultural events.

=== Scotland ===
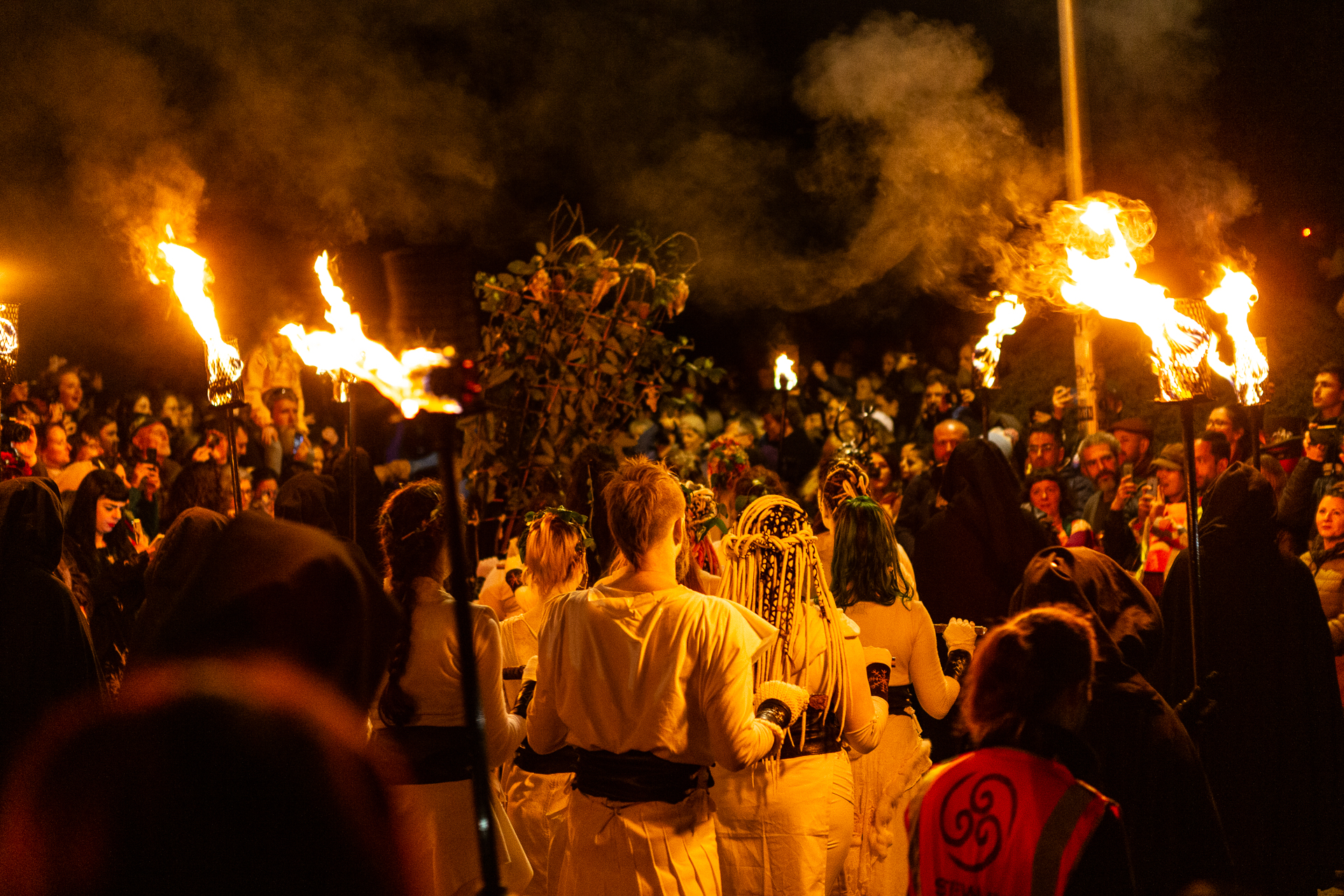
Beltane Fire Festival in Edinburgh, Scotland, 2019

May Day or Beltane has been celebrated in Scotland for centuries. In Gaelic regions, celebrations of Bealltainn were very similar to those in Ireland, including bonfires, decking doors and windows with flowers and greenery, and rituals involving the fires and Beltane bannocks. The Scots poem "Peblis to the Play", in the 15th- and 16th-century Maitland Manuscripts, refers to Beltane and May Day:

At Beltane, quhen ilk bodie bownis
To Peblis to the Play,
To heir the singin and the soundis;
The solace, suth to say,
Be firth and forrest furth they found
Thay graythis tham full gay;
God wait that wald they do that stound,
For it was their feast day the day they celebrate May Day,

The poem describes the celebration in the town of Peebles in the Scottish Borders, which continues to stage a parade and pageant each year, including the annual 'Common Riding', which takes place in many towns throughout the Borders. As well as the crowning of a Beltane Queen each year, it is custom to sing "The Beltane Song".

John Jamieson, in his Etymological Dictionary of the Scottish Language (1808) describes some of the May Day/Beltane customs which persisted in the eighteenth and early nineteenth centuries in parts of Scotland, which he noted were beginning to die out. In the nineteenth century, folklorist Alexander Carmichael (1832–1912), collected the song Am Beannachadh Bealltain (The Beltane Blessing) in his Carmina Gadelica, which he heard from a crofter in South Uist.

Scottish May Day/Beltane celebrations have been somewhat revived since the late twentieth century. Both Edinburgh and Glasgow organise May Day festivals. In Edinburgh, the Beltane Fire Festival is held on May Eve and into the early hours of May Day on the city's Calton Hill. An older Edinburgh tradition has it that young women who climb Arthur's Seat and wash their faces in the morning dew will have lifelong beauty. At the University of St Andrews, some of the students gather on the beach late on May Eve and run into the North Sea at sunrise on May Day, sometimes naked. This is accompanied by torchlit processions and celebration.

=== Wales ===
In Wales, the first day of May is known as Calan Mai or Calan Haf ("first of summer"), and parallels the festival of Beltane and other May Day traditions in Europe. On May Eve (Nos Galan Haf) bonfires were lit in parts of Wales. It was considered a Ysbrydnos or spirit night when people would gather hawthorn (draenen wen) and flowers to decorate their houses, celebrating new growth and fertility. On May Day, celebrations included summer dancing (dawnsio haf) and May carols (carolau mai or carolau haf). May Day was also a time for officially opening a village green (twmpath chwarae).

== England ==
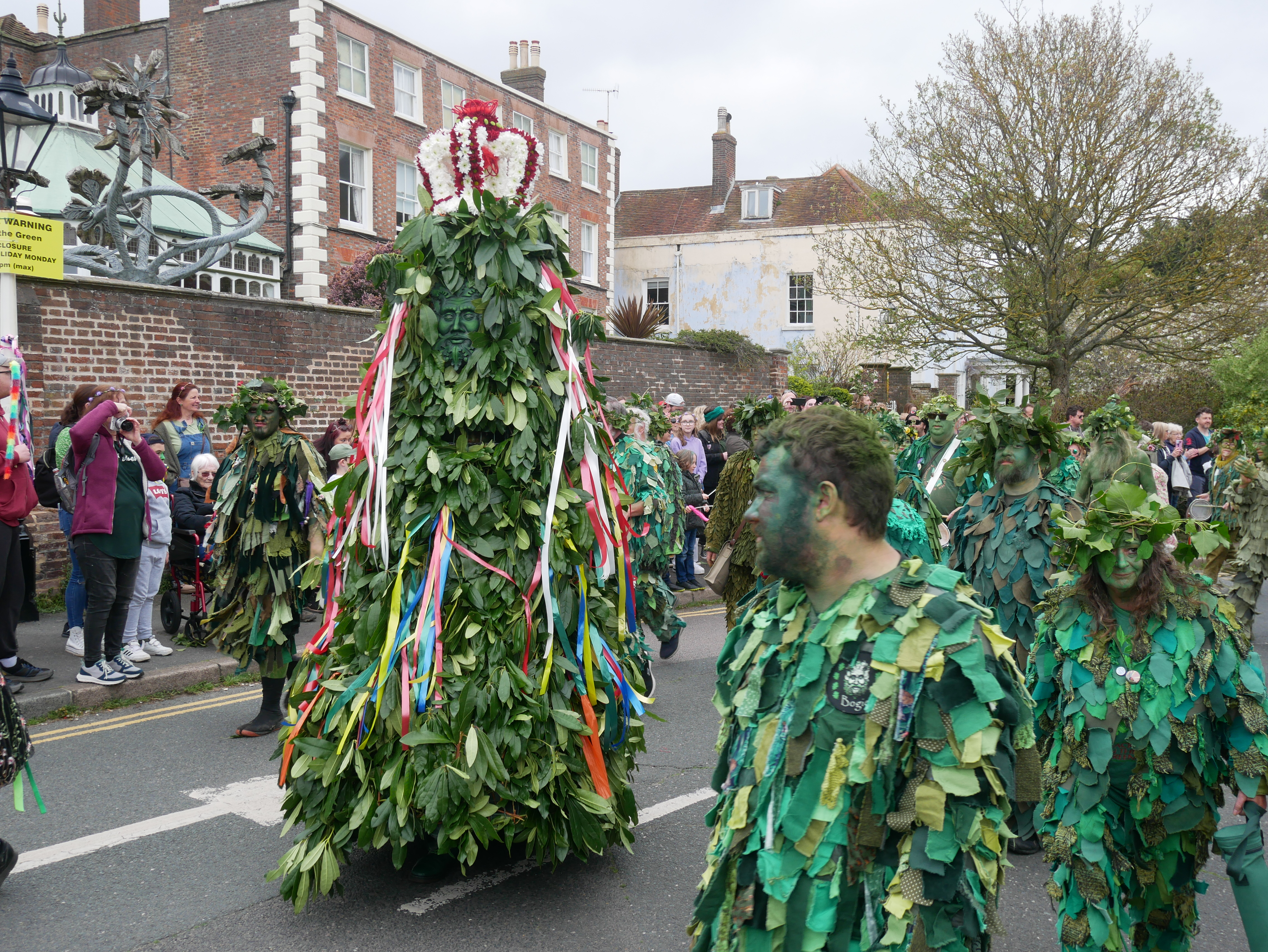
Jack in the Green procession at Hastings May Day celebration, 2023

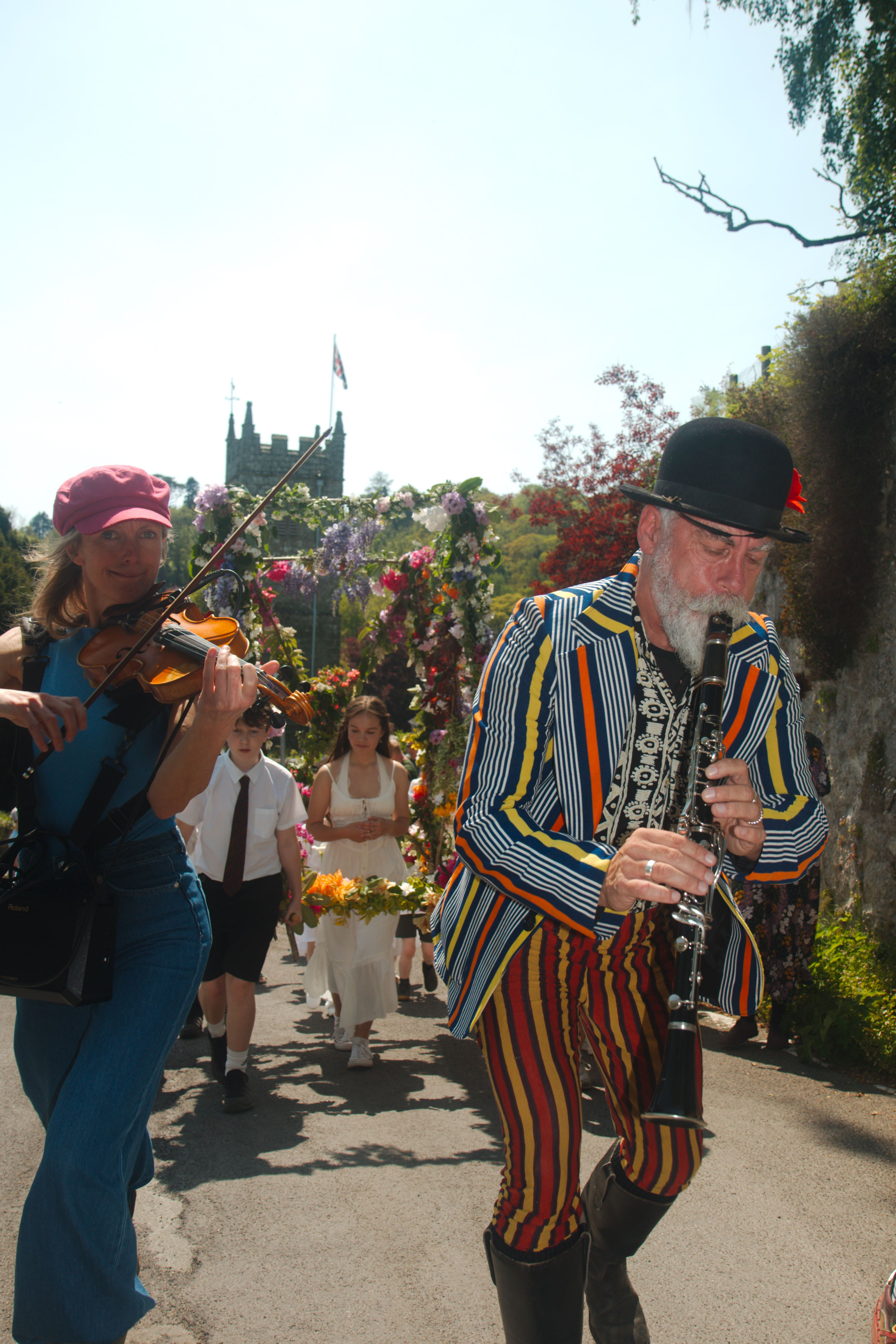
May Day parade, with a May Queen, in Lustleigh, England

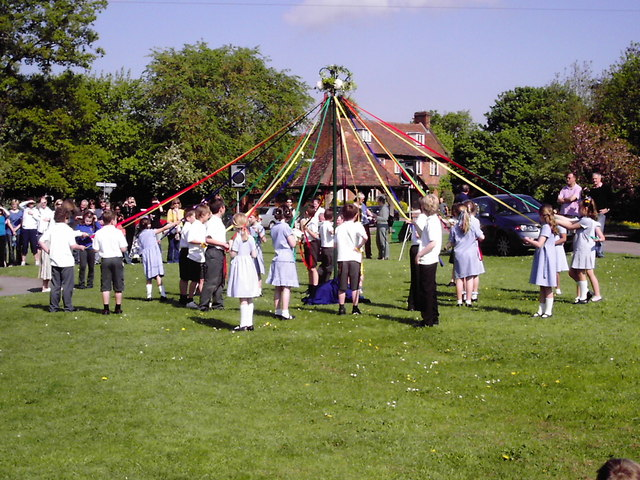
Children dancing around a maypole as part of a May Day celebration in Welwyn, Hertfordshire, 2009

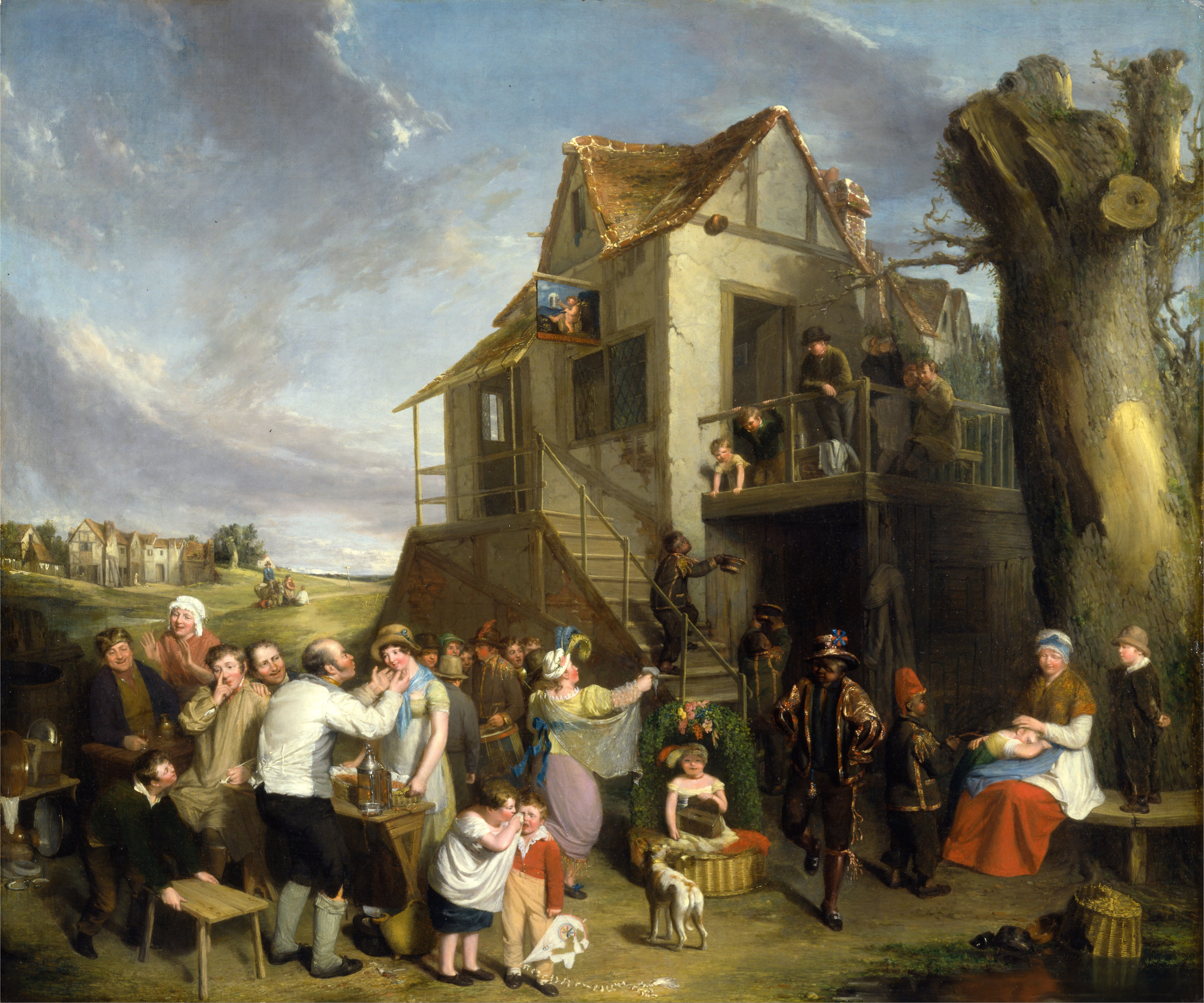
May Day (1812) by William Collins

Traditional English May Day rites and celebrations include crowning a May Queen and celebrations involving a maypole, around which dancers often circle with ribbons. Morris dancing is also often performed as part of May Day celebrations. The earliest records of maypole celebrations date to the 14th century, and by the 15th century the maypole tradition was well established in southern Britain.

On 1 May 1515, Henry VIII and Catherine of Aragon rode from Greenwich Palace to have breakfast in an arbour constructed in a wood at Shooter's Hill. Catherine and her ladies were dressed in Spanish-style riding gear, Henry was in green velvet. The royal guard appeared in disguise as Robin Hood and his men. There was a pageant chariot or car with Lady May and Lady Flora, followed by a masque and dancing. The chronicle writer Edward Hall recorded the event as a "Maying".

Writer Philip Stubbs described English May Day celebrations in the 1580s, involving a particularly large Maypole:

"They have twenty or forty yoke of oxen, every ox having a sweet nosegay of flowers tied to the tip of its horns, and these oxen draw home this maypole ... which is covered all over with flowers and herbs, bound about with strings, from the top to the bottom, and sometimes painted with variable colours, with two or three hundred men, women and children following it with great devotion. And thus being reared up, with handkerchiefs and flags streaming at the top, they strew the ground around about, bind green boughs about it, set up summer halls, bowers and arbours hard by it. And then they fall to banquet and feast, to leap and dance about it".

Another prominent English May Day custom is Jack in the Green, an English folkloric figure who parades through the streets on May Day, accompanied by musicians, beggars, and various other characters.

May Day was abolished and its celebration banned by Puritan parliaments during the Interregnum, but reinstated with the restoration of Charles II in 1660.

Traditional celebrations continue in some places, some with unbroken records (with some known breaks for world wars and COVID-19) for over a century, including:

- Ickwell May Day – records from 1872, but involving a bequest to continue a tradition still in operation.
- Knutsford Royal May Day – revived in 1864.
- Lustleigh May Day – revived 1905.
- Brentham May Day Festival – revived 1906.
- London's May Queen – held at Hayes Common in Bromley, running since 1912 or 1913.
- Hayfield May Day – revived in 1928.

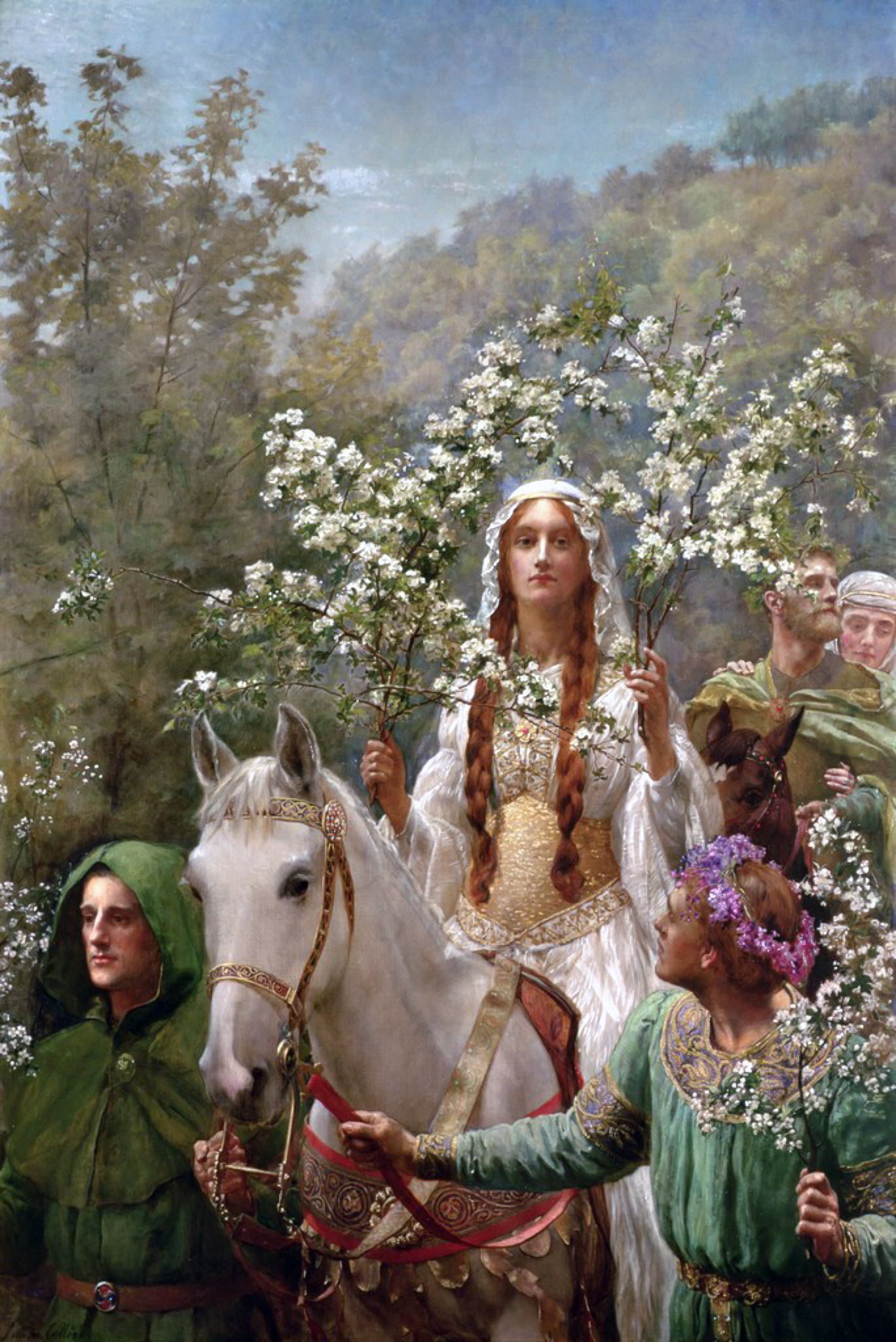
Queen Guinevere's Maying, by John Collier, 1897 For thus it chanced one morn when all the court, Green-suited, but with plumes that mocked the may, Had been, there won't, a-maying and returned, That Modred still in the green, all ear and eye, Climbed to the high top of the garden-wall To spy some secret scandal if he might,

In Cambridgeshire villages, young girls went May Dolling (going around the villages with dressed dolls and collecting pennies). This dressing of dolls and singing was said to have persisted into the 1960s in Swaffham Prior, including the song:

Sing a song of May-time.
Sing a song of Spring.
Flowers are in their beauty.
Birds are on the wing.
May time, play time.
God has given us May time.
Thank Him for His gifts of love.
Sing a song of Spring.

In Oxford, it is a centuries-old tradition for May Morning revellers to gather below the Great Tower of Magdalen College at 6 am to listen to the college choir sing traditional madrigals as a conclusion to the previous night's celebrations. Since the 1980s some people then jump off Magdalen Bridge into the River Cherwell. For some years, the bridge has been closed on 1 May to prevent people from jumping, as the water under the bridge is only 2 feet (61 cm) deep and jumping from the bridge has resulted in serious injury in the past. There are still people who climb the barriers and leap into the water, causing themselves injury.

Padstow in Cornwall holds its annual 'Obby-'Oss (Hobby Horse) day of festivities. This is believed to be one of the oldest fertility rites in the UK; revellers dance with the Oss through the streets of the town and even though the private gardens of the citizens, accompanied by accordion players and followers dressed in white with red or blue sashes who sing traditional May Day songs. The whole town is decorated with springtime greenery, and every year thousands of onlookers attend. Before the 19th century, distinctive May Day celebrations were widespread throughout West Cornwall, and are being revived in St Ives and Penzance. A similar 'Obby 'Oss festival is also held in the Somerset town of Minehead, dating back to at least the 19th century.

Kingsand, Cawsand and Millbrook in Cornwall celebrate Flower Boat Ritual on the May Day bank holiday. A model of the ship The Black Prince is covered in flowers and is taken in a procession from the Quay at Millbrook to the beach at Cawsand where it is cast adrift. The houses in the villages are decorated with flowers and people traditionally wear red and white clothes. There are further celebrations in Cawsand Square with Morris dancing and maypole dancing.

'Dancing the sun up' is a tradition among Morris dancers to dance at sunrise on May Day, to welcome in the sun and the summer season. It began in Oxford in 1923, and includes dances, traditional May Day songs, and sometimes other activities such as mummers' plays or bonfires. This tradition has since spread across the world, with Morris dance teams dancing the sun up in Asia, Australia, Canada, France, New Zealand, and the US.

The early May bank holiday on the first Monday in May was created in 1978; May Day itself – 1 May – is not a public holiday in England (unless it falls on a Monday).

== France ==
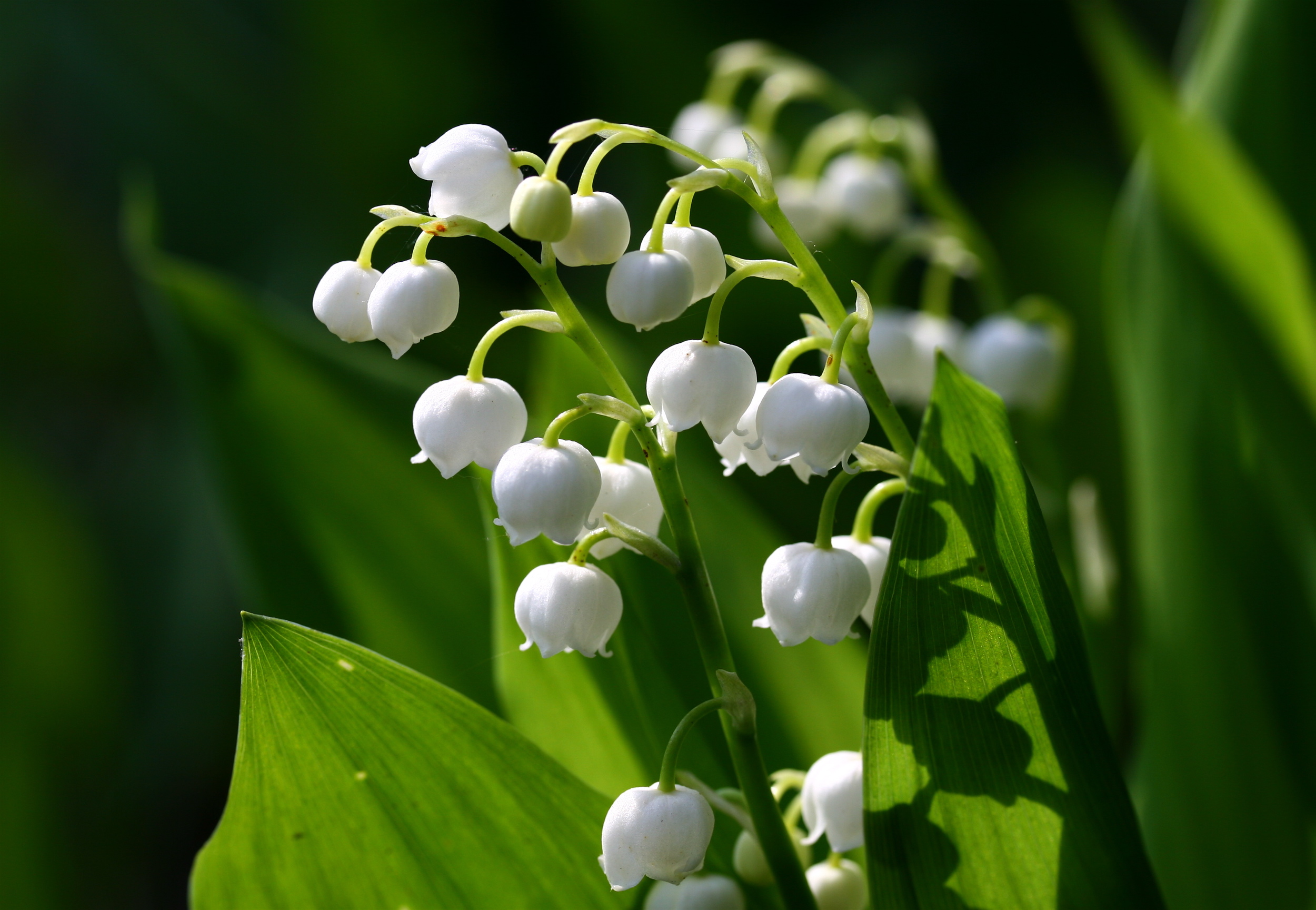
Lily of the valley

In Provence, 'May trees' decked with flowers and ribbons were traditionally set up on May Day in every village. It was also a tradition for young girls to be dressed in white, decked with crowns and wreaths of roses, and set on seats or platforms strewn with flowers in the streets. Their companions would go about asking for money from passers-by.

On 1 May 1561, King Charles IX of France received a lily of the valley as a lucky charm. He decided to offer a lily of the valley each year to the ladies of the court. At the beginning of the 20th century, it became custom to give a sprig of lily of the valley, a symbol of springtime, on 1 May. The government permits individuals and workers' organisations to sell them tax-free on that single day. Nowadays, people may present loved ones either with bunches of lily of the valley or dog rose flowers.

== Czech Republic ==
In the Czech Republic, May Day is traditionally considered a holiday of love and May as a month of love. The celebrations of spring are held on 30 April when a maypole (Czech: májka /mɑːjkɑ/) is erected—a tradition possibly connected to Beltane, since bonfires are also lit on the same day. The event is similar to German Walpurgisnacht, its public holiday on 30 April. On 31 May, the maypole is taken down in an event called Maypole Felling.

On 1 May, couples in love kiss under a blooming tree. According to the ethnographer Klára Posekaná, this is not an old habit. It most likely originated around the beginning of the 20th century in an urban environment, perhaps in connection with Karel Hynek Mácha's poem Máj (which is often recited during these days) and Petřín. This is usually done under a cherry, an apple or a birch tree.

== Finnic regions ==
=== Estonia ===
May Day or "Spring Day" (Kevadpüha) is a national holiday in Estonia celebrating the arrival of spring.

More traditional festivities take place throughout the night before and into the early hours of 1 May, on the Walpurgis Night (Volbriöö).

The tradition of erecting maypoles (meiupuu) exists also in West-Estonia, but instead on 1 May, celebrations take place in Jaanipäev.

=== Finland ===
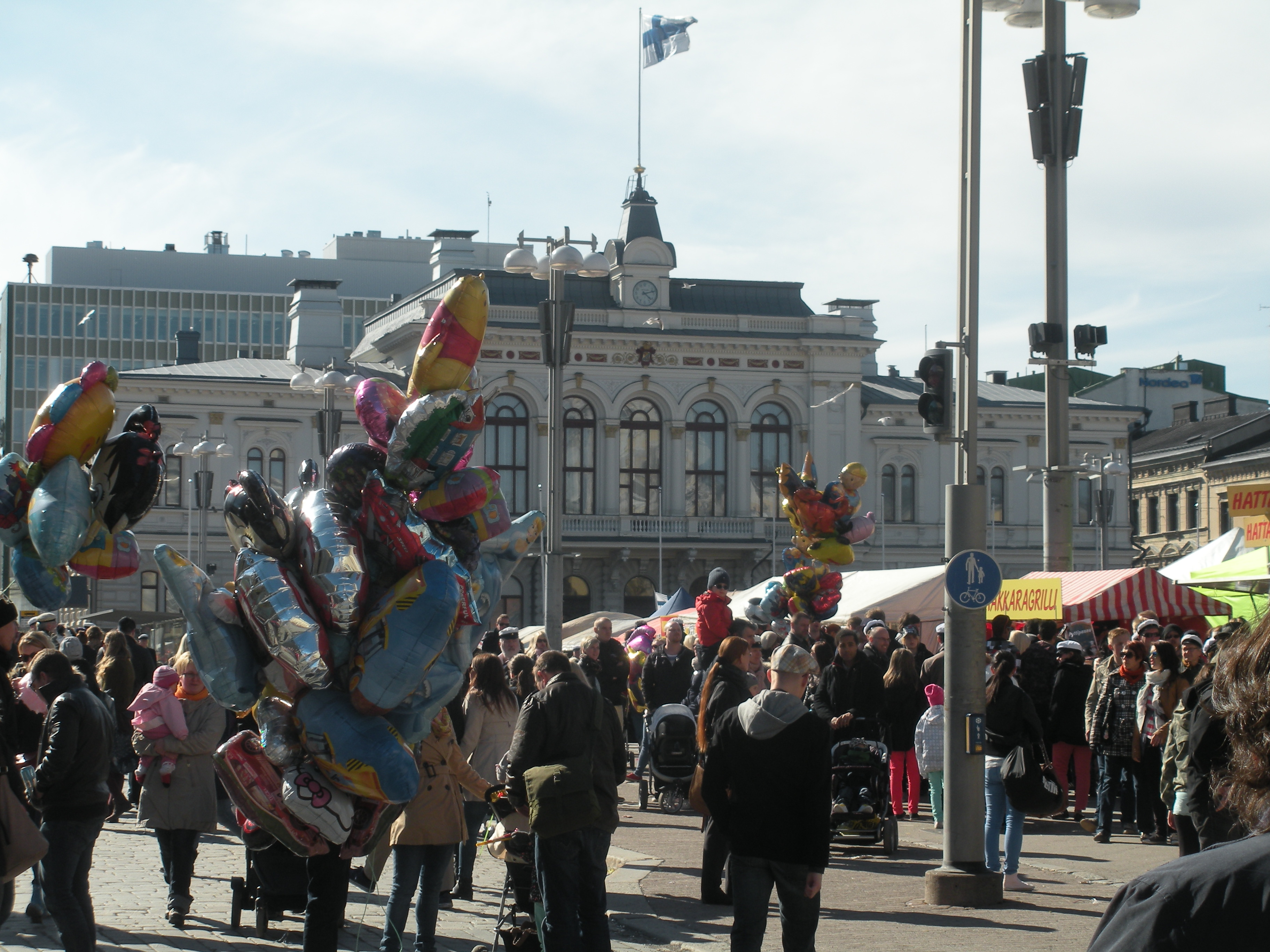
May Day festivities in Tampere Central Square, Finland

In Finland, Walpurgis night (Vappu) ("Vappen") is one of the five biggest holidays along with Christmas Eve, New Year's Eve, Easter, and Midsummer (Juhannus - Midsommar). Walpurgis witnesses the biggest carnival-style festival held in Finland's cities and towns. The celebrations, which begin on the evening of 30 April and continue on 1 May, typically centre on the consumption of sima, sparkling wine and other alcoholic beverages. Student traditions, particularly those of engineering students, are one of the main characteristics of Vappu. Since the end of the 19th century, this traditional upper-class feast has been appropriated by university students. Many lukio (university-preparatory high school) alumni wear the black and white student cap and many higher education students wear student coveralls. One tradition is to drink sima, a home-made low-alcohol mead, along with freshly cooked funnel cakes.

== Iberia ==
=== Portugal ===
"Maias" is a superstition throughout Portugal, with special focus on the northern territories and rarely elsewhere. Maias is the dominant naming in Northern Portugal, but it may be referred to by other names, including Dia das Bruxas (Witches' day), O Burro (the Donkey, referring to an evil spirit) or the last of April, as the local traditions preserved to this day occur on that evening only. People put the yellow flowers of broom, the bushes are known as giestas. The flowers of the bush are known as Maias, which are placed on doors or gates and every doorway of houses, windows, granaries, currently also cars, which the populace collect on the evening of 30 April when the Portuguese brooms are blooming, to defend those places from bad spirits, witches and the evil eye. The placement of the May flower or bush in the doorway must be done before midnight.

These festivities are a continuum of the "Os Maios" of Galiza. In ancient times, this was done while playing traditional night-music. In some places, children were dressed in these flowers and went from place to place begging for money or bread. On 1 May, people also used to sing "Cantigas de Maio", traditional songs related to this day and the whole month of May.

The origin of this tradition can be traced to the Catholic Church story of Mary and Joseph fleeing to Egypt to protect Jesus from Herod. It was said that brooms could be found at the door of the house holding Jesus, but when Herod's soldiers arrived to the place they found every door decorated with brooms.

=== Spain ===
May Day is celebrated throughout the country as Los Mayos (lit. "the Mays") often in a similar way to "Fiesta de las Cruces" in many parts of Hispanic America. One such example, in Galicia, is the festival "Fiesta de los Mayos" (or "Festa dos Maios" in Galician, the local language). It has a Celtic origin (from the festivity of Beltane) and consists of different traditions, such as representations around a decorated tree or sculpture. People sing popular songs (also called maios), making mentions of social and political events during the past year, sometimes under the form of a converse, while they walk around the sculpture with the percussion of two sticks. In Lugo and in the village of Vilagarcía de Arousa it was usual to ask a tip to the attendees, which used to be a handful of dry chestnuts (castañas maiolas), walnuts or hazelnuts. Today the tradition became a competition where the best sculptures and songs receive a prize.

In the Galician city of Ourense, this day is celebrated traditionally on 3 May, the day of the Holy Cross, that in the Christian tradition replaced the tree "where the health, life and resurrection are", according to the introit of that day's mass.

== Italy ==
In Italy it is called Calendimaggio or cantar maggio, a seasonal feast held to celebrate the arrival of spring. The event takes its name from the period in which it takes place, that is, the beginning of May, from the Latin kalendae maiae. The Calendimaggio is a tradition still alive today in many regions of Italy as an allegory of the return to life and rebirth: among these Piedmont, Liguria, Lombardy, Emilia-Romagna (for example, is celebrated in the area of the Quattro Province or Piacenza, Pavia, Alessandria and Genoa), Tuscany and Umbria. This magical-propitiatory ritual is often performed during an almsgiving in which, in exchange for gifts (traditionally eggs, wine, food or sweets), the Maggi (or maggerini) sing auspicious verses to the inhabitants of the houses they visit. Throughout the Italian peninsula these Il Maggio couplets are very diverse—most are love songs with a strong romantic theme, that young people sang to celebrate the arrival of spring. Roman families traditionally eat pecorino with fresh fava beans during an excursion in the Roman Campagna. Symbols of spring revival are the trees (alder, golden rain) and flowers (violets, roses), mentioned in the verses of the songs, and with which the maggerini adorn themselves. In particular the plant alder, which grows along the rivers, is considered the symbol of life and that's why it is often present in the ritual.

Calendimaggio can be historically noted in Tuscany as a mythical character who had a predominant role and met many of the attributes of the god Belenus. In Lucania, the 'Maggi' have a clear auspicious character of pagan origin. In Syracuse, Sicily, the Albero della Cuccagna (cf. "Greasy pole") is held during the month of May, a feast celebrated to commemorate the victory over the Athenians led by Nicias. However, Angelo de Gubernatis, in his work Mythology of Plants, believes that without doubt the festival was previous to that of said victory.

It is a celebration that dates back to ancient peoples, and is very integrated with the rhythms of nature, such as the Celts (celebrating Beltane), Etruscans and Ligures, in which the arrival of summer was of great importance.

== Southeastern Europe ==
=== Bulgaria ===
On May Day, Bulgarians celebrate Irminden (or Yeremiya, Eremiya, Irima, Zamski den). The holiday is associated with snakes and lizards and rituals are made in order to protect people from them. The name of the holiday comes from the prophet Jeremiah, but its origins are most probably pagan.

It is said that on the days of the Holy Forty or Annunciation snakes come out of their burrows, and on Irminden their king comes out. Old people believe that those working in the fields on this day will be bitten by a snake in summer.

Western Bulgarians light fires, jump over them and make noises to scare snakes. Another custom is to prepare "podnici" (special clay pots made for baking bread).

This day is especially observed by pregnant women so that their offspring do not catch "yeremiya"—an illness due to evil powers.

=== Greece ===
1 May is a day that celebrates Spring.

Maios (Latin Maius), the month of May, took its name from the goddess Maia, a Roman earth goddess. The day of Maios (Modern Greek Πρωτομαγιά) celebrates the final victory of the summer against winter as the victory of life against death. The celebration is similar to an ancient ritual associated with another minor demi-god Adonis which also celebrated the revival of nature. There is today some conflation with yet another tradition, the revival or marriage of Dionysus (the Greek God of theatre and wine-making). This event, however, was celebrated in ancient times not in May but in association with the Anthesteria, a festival held in February and dedicated to the goddess of agriculture Demeter and her daughter Persephone. Persephone emerged every year at the end of winter from the Underworld. The Anthesteria was a festival of souls, plants and flowers, and Persephone's coming to earth from Hades marked the rebirth of nature, a common theme in all these traditions.

What remains of the customs today, echoes these traditions of antiquity. A common, until recently, May Day custom involved the annual revival of a youth called Adonis, or alternatively of Dionysus, or of Maios (in Modern Greek Μαγιόπουλο, the Son of Maia). In a simple theatrical ritual, the significance of which has long been forgotten, a chorus of young girls sang a song over a youth lying on the ground, representing Adonis, Dionysus or Maios. At the end of the song, the youth rose up and a flower wreath was placed on his head.

The most common aspect of modern May Day celebrations is the preparation of a flower wreath from wild flowers, although as a result of urbanisation there is an increasing trend to buy wreaths from flower shops. The flowers are placed on the wreath against a background of green leaves and the wreath is hung either on the entrance to the family house/apartment or on a balcony. It remains there until midsummer night. On that night, the flower wreaths are set alight in bonfires known as Saint John's fires. Youths leap over the flames consuming the flower wreaths. This custom has also practically disappeared, like the theatrical revival of Adonis/Dionysus/Maios, as a result of rising urban traffic and with no alternative public grounds in most Greek city neighbourhoods.

=== Hungary ===
In Hungary it is called St. Philip and Jacob's day or sometimes Zöldfarsang. However, contrary to the name, the ecclesiastical explanation of the feast actually refers to the miracle of St. Walpurga. In contrast, the Hexennacht tradition has survived in only a few places, with witchcraft traditions usually taking place on other days.

The Majális, a merry folk festival, was usually held in a nearby forest, with the food and drink being taken along, which was usually attended by the whole town. There were sack-races, tree climbing, wrestling, strength tests, horse races, singing, dancing and military songs. It was a day of relaxing and walking in nature.

Paul Szinyei Merse: Majális. The painting portrays the Majális picnic.

The Majális has a rich tradition in the country, celebrated with dance festivals, concert series and funfairs, set up all throughout the country. There is also an utcabál ("street bal"), when the streets are often filled with dancing residents.

In smaller settlements like (in e.g. Pilisszentkereszt) together with their neighbouring municipalities, set up a May Pole.

In Hungary it was customary to set up May Poles (májfa or májusfa) in several places in the town. It was usually set on May Day or Pentecost. Sometimes they were just tied to the fence, but most of the time they were planted in the ground. The trees were carved and erected in secret, usually in the dead of night. The aim was always to go out with the girls. the boys set them up (usually one for every unmarried girl) and it was danced around together. For the night the tree was usually guarded, so that it would not be taken away by rivals, or toppled by a rival's courting team.

"Drink water on an empty stomach: the lungs will be renewed" - they used to say in Transylvania, where it was customary for girls to go to the spring or river on this day to wash their faces in water, which was believed to have magical powers to make them beautiful and healthy. Other superstitions include decorating the house with elderberries to ward off witches, and that the butter spat out on this day, called Philip-Jacob butter, can be used to treat earache.

=== Romania ===
On May Day, the Romanians celebrate the arminden (or armindeni), the beginning of summer, symbolically tied with the protection of crops and farm animals. The name comes from Slavonic Jeremiinŭ dĭnĭ, meaning prophet Jeremiah's day, but the celebration rites and habits of this day are apotropaic and pagan (possibly originating in the cult of the god Pan).

The day is also called ziua pelinului ("mugwort day") or ziua bețivilor ("drunkards' day") and it is celebrated to ensure good wine in autumn and, for people and farm animals alike, good health and protection from the elements of nature (storms, hail, illness, pests). People would have parties in natural surroundings, with lăutari (fiddlers) for those who could afford it. Then it is customary to roast and eat lamb, along with new mutton cheese, and to drink mugwort-flavoured wine, or just red wine, to refresh the blood and get protection from diseases. On the way back, the men wear lilac or mugwort flowers on their hats.

Other apotropaic rites include, in some areas of the country, people washing their faces with the morning dew (for good health) and adorning the gates for good luck and abundance with green branches or with birch saplings (for the houses with maiden girls). The entries to the animals' shelters are also adorned with green branches. All branches are left in place until the wheat harvest when they are used in the fire which will bake the first bread from the new wheat.

On May Day eve, country women do not work in the field as well as in the house to avoid devastating storms and hail coming down on the village.

Arminden is also ziua boilor (oxen day) and thus the animals are not to be used for work, or else they could die or their owners could get ill.

It is said that the weather is always good on May Day to allow people to celebrate.

=== Serbia ===
"Prvomajski uranak" (Reveille on 1 May) is a folk tradition and feast that consists of the fact that on 1 May, people go in the nature or even leave the day before and spend the night with a camp fire. Most of the time, a dish is cooked in a kettle or in a barbecue. Among Serbs this holiday is widespread. Almost every town in Serbia has its own traditional first-of-may excursion sites, and most often these are green areas outside the city.

== North America ==
=== Canada ===
May Day is celebrated in some parts of the provinces of British Columbia, Quebec, New Brunswick and Ontario.

Toronto

In Toronto, on the morning of 1 May, various Morris Dancing troops from Toronto and Hamilton gather on the road by Grenadier Cafe, in High Park to "dance in the May". The dancers and crowd then gather together and sing traditional May Day songs such as Hal-An-Tow and Padstow.

British Columbia

Celebrations often take place not on 1 May but during the Victoria Day long weekend, later in the month and when the weather is likely to be better. The longest continually observed May Day in the British Commonwealth is held in the city of New Westminster, BC. There, the first May Day celebration was held on 4 May 1870.

=== United States ===
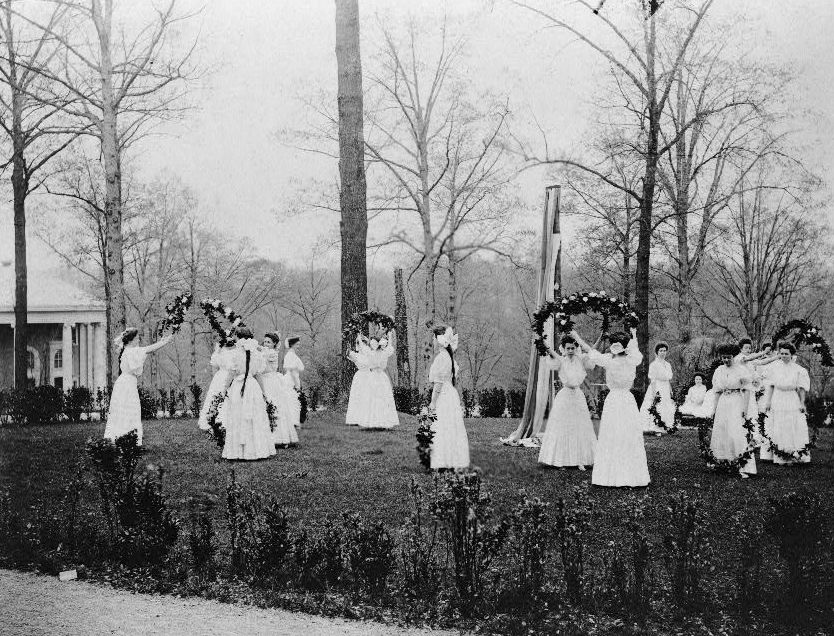
May Day festivities at National Park Seminary in Maryland, 1907

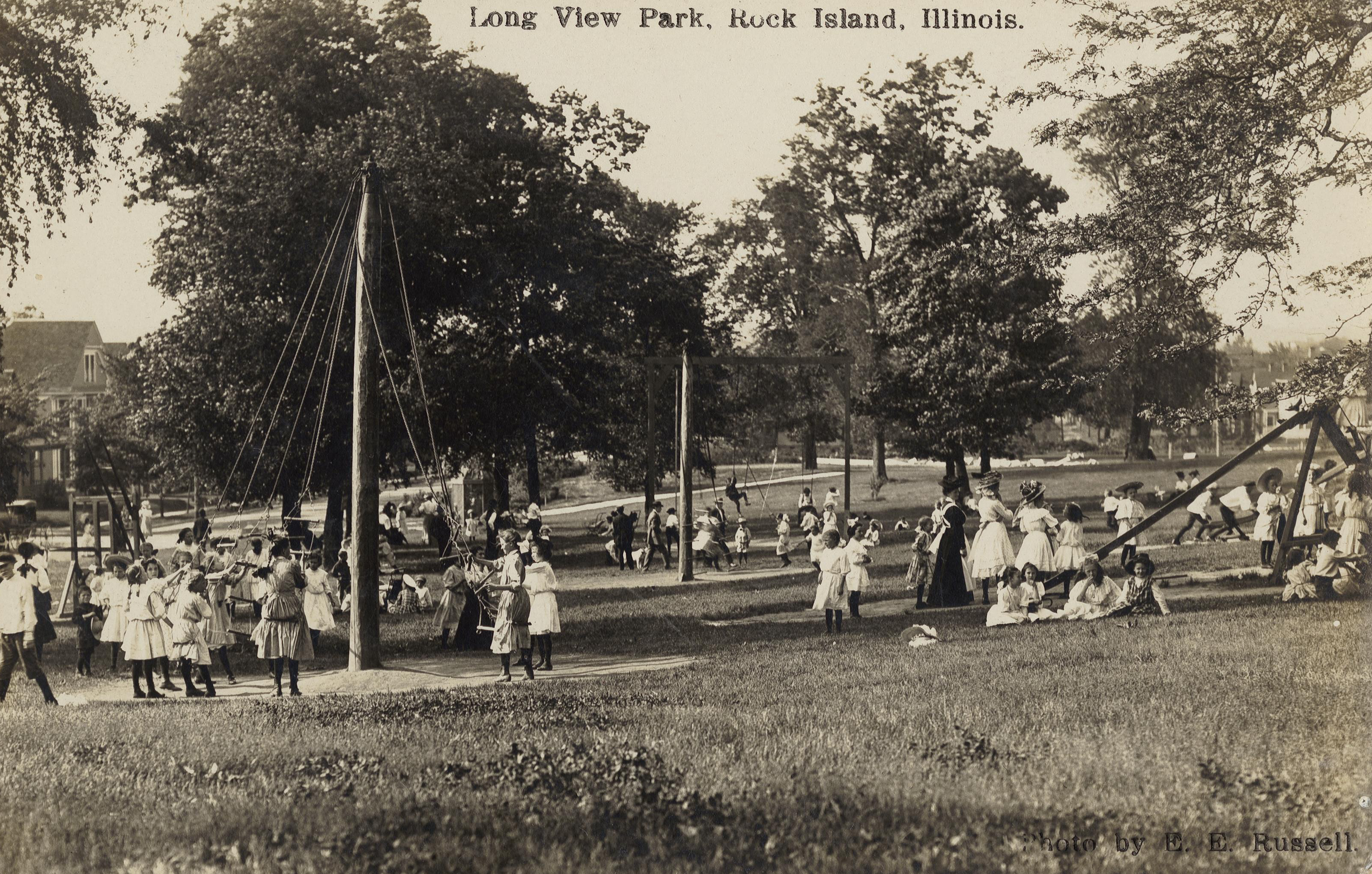
May Day festivities at Longview Park in Rock Island, Illinois, c. 1907 – 1914

Early European settlers of the Americas brought their May Day traditions with them, and May Day is still celebrated in many parts of the United States, with customs that vary from region to region. In some parts of the United States, May baskets are made. These are small baskets usually filled with flowers or treats and left at someone's doorstep. The giver rings the bell and runs away.

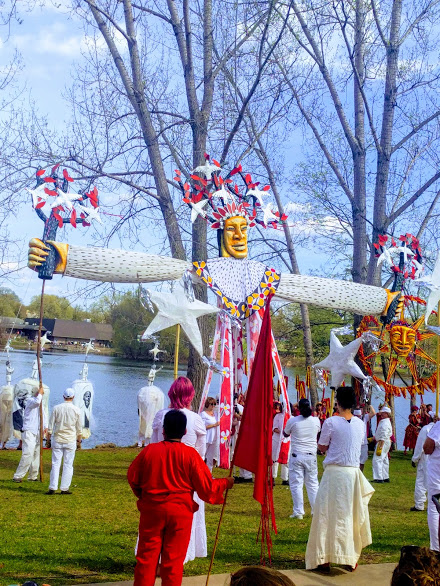
Tree of Life Ceremony as part of 2018 May Day celebration in Powderhorn Park, Minneapolis.

May Day celebrations were common at women's colleges and academic institutions in the late nineteenth and early twentieth century, a tradition that continues at Bryn Mawr College and Brenau University to this day.

In Minneapolis, the May Day Parade and Festival is presented annually on the first Sunday in May, and draws around 50,000 people to Powderhorn Park. The festival was originated by In the Heart of the Beast Puppet and Mask Theatre and is now decentralized and community-run. On 1 May itself, local Morris Dance sides converge on an overlook of the Mississippi River at dawn, and then spend the remainder of the day dancing around the metro area.

Morris dancers in the US have continued the English custom of 'dancing the sun up' on May Day, dancing at sunrise to welcome in the sun and the summer season. In 2024, Morris dancers danced the sun up in Colorado, Connecticut, Illinois, Maryland, Massachusetts, Minnesota, Missouri, Montana, Oregon, Pennsylvania, Rhode Island, Washington, and Wisconsin.

Hawaii

In Hawaii, May Day is also known as Lei Day, and it is normally set aside as a day to celebrate island culture in general and the culture of the Native Hawaiians in particular. Invented by poet and local newspaper columnist Don Blanding, the first Lei Day was celebrated on 1 May 1927 in Honolulu. Leonard "Red" and Ruth Hawk composed "May Day Is Lei Day in Hawai'i", the traditional holiday song.

== See also ==
- Flores de Mayo, a similar holiday celebrated throughout the month of May in the Philippines
- Beltane, the Gaelic May Day festival
- Fiesta de las Cruces, a holiday celebrated 3 May in many parts of Spain and Hispanic America
- List of films set around May Day
- List of occasions known by their dates
- May devotions to the Blessed Virgin Mary
- Maypole
- May Queen
- Dano, a holiday celebrated on the 5th day of the 5th lunar month in Korea

== Sources ==
- Tutty, Michael J. (1 March 1973). "Finglas". Dublin Historical Record. 26 (2). Dublin: Old Dublin Society: 66–73. JSTOR 30082560.
