= May Queen =

Personification of the May Day holiday

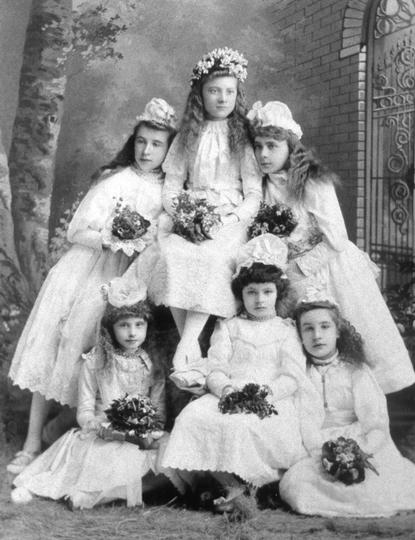
A May Queen of New Westminster, British Columbia, Canada circa 1877

In the British Isles and parts of the Commonwealth, the May Queen or Queen of May is a personification of the May Day holiday of 1 May, and of springtime and the coming growing season. The May Queen is a girl who rides or walks at the front of a parade for May Day celebrations. She wears a white gown to symbolise purity and usually a tiara or crown. Her duty is to begin the May Day celebrations. She is generally crowned by flowers and makes a speech before the dancing begins. Certain age-groups dance around a Maypole celebrating youth and springtime.

== History ==
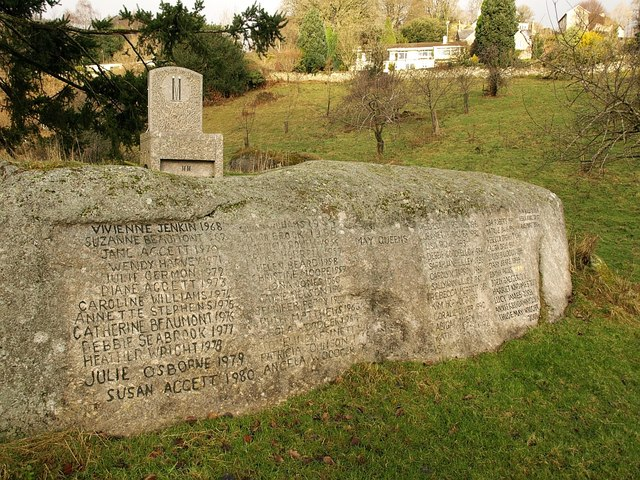
May Queen's granite throne engraved with names of past May Queens, used for Lustleigh May Day

In 1922 James George Frazer speculated that the figure of the May Queen was linked to ancient tree worship.

In the High Middle Ages in England the May Queen was also known as the "Summer Queen". George C. Homans points out: "The time from Hocktide, after Easter Week, to Lammas (1 August) was summer (estas)."

In 1557, a London diarist called Henry Machyn wrote:

"The xxx day of May was a goly May-gam in Fanch-chyrchestrett with drumes and gunes and pykes, and ix wordes dyd ryd; and thay had speches evere man, and the morris dansse and the sauden, and an elevant with the castyll, and the sauden and yonge morens with targattes and darttes, and the lord and the lade of the Maye".

Modern English: On the 30 May was a jolly May-game in Fenchurch Street (London) with drums and guns and pikes, The Nine Worthies did ride; and they all had speeches, and the morris dance and sultan and an elephant with a castle and the sultan and young moors with shields and arrows, and the lord and lady of the May".

The British Newspaper Archive has published a detailed analysis of the history of the May Queen.

== Maintaining the tradition ==
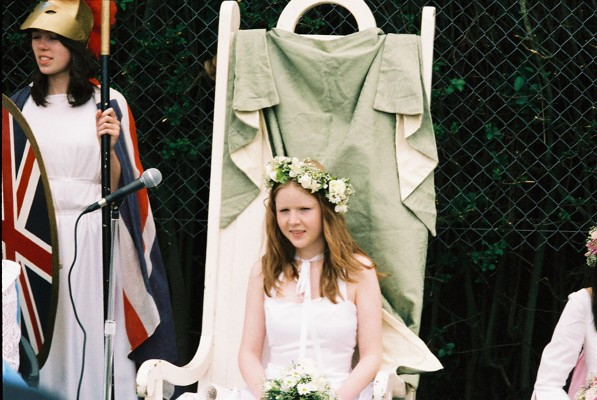
The 2005 May Queen of Brentham, England on her throne

Many areas keep this tradition alive today. Whilst exact records are often unavailable, a number of celebrations have unbroken records (with some known breaks for world wars and COVID-19) spanning over 100 years. Regular May Queen celebrations in the 21st Century include:

- Ickwell May Day - records from 1872, but involving a bequest to continue a tradition still in operation.
- Knutsford Royal May Day - revived in 1864.
- Lustleigh May Day, revived 1905.
- Brentham May Day Festival, revived 1906.
- London's May Queen, held at Hayes Common in Bromley, running since 1912 or 1913.
- Hayfield May Day - revived in 1928.
- Sawrey May Day in Cumbria, the village in which Beatrix Potter lived. Revived pre World War 2.

YOU must wake and call me early, call me early,
mother dear;
To-morrow 'll be the happiest time of all the glad
new-year, -
Of all the glad new-year, mother, the maddest,
merriest day;
For I'm to be Queen o' the May, mother, I'm to
be Queen o' the May.

I sleep so sound all night, mother, that I shall
never wake,
If you do not call me loud when the day begins
to break;
But I must gather knots of flowers and buds,
and garlands gay;
For I'm to be Queen o' the May, mother, I'm to
be Queen o' the May.

Little Effie shall go with me to-morrow to the
green,
And you'll be there, too, mother, to see me made
the Queen;
For the shepherd lads on every side 'll come from
far away;
And I'm to be Queen o' the May, mother, I'm to
be Queen o' the May.

The night-winds come and go, mother, upon the
meadow-grass,
And the happy stars above them seem to brighten
as they pass;
There will not be a drop of rain the whole of the
livelong day;
And I'm to be Queen o' the May, mother, I'm to
be Queen o' the May.

All the valley, mother, 'll be fresh and green and
still,
And the cowslip and the crowfoot are over all the
hill,
And the rivulet in the flowery dale 'll merrily
glance and play,
For I'm to be Queen o' the May, mother, I'm to
be Queen o' the May.

— From "The May Queen" poem by Alfred Tennyson

A May Day celebration held annually since 1870 in New Westminster, British Columbia, Canada, has the distinction of being the longest running May Day celebration of its kind in the British Commonwealth.

== Related personifications ==
Male companions to the May Queen, sometimes associated with May Day customs in Great Britain, include personifications known as Father May, King of the May, May King, Garland King, Green Man, or Jack in the Green. As part of this folk custom, some villages would choose a man to act as consort for the May Queen. This man, the May King, would dress in greenery to symbolise springtime.

== See also ==
- May crowning
