= Lustleigh May Day =

Annual celebration in Lustleigh, Devon, United Kingdom

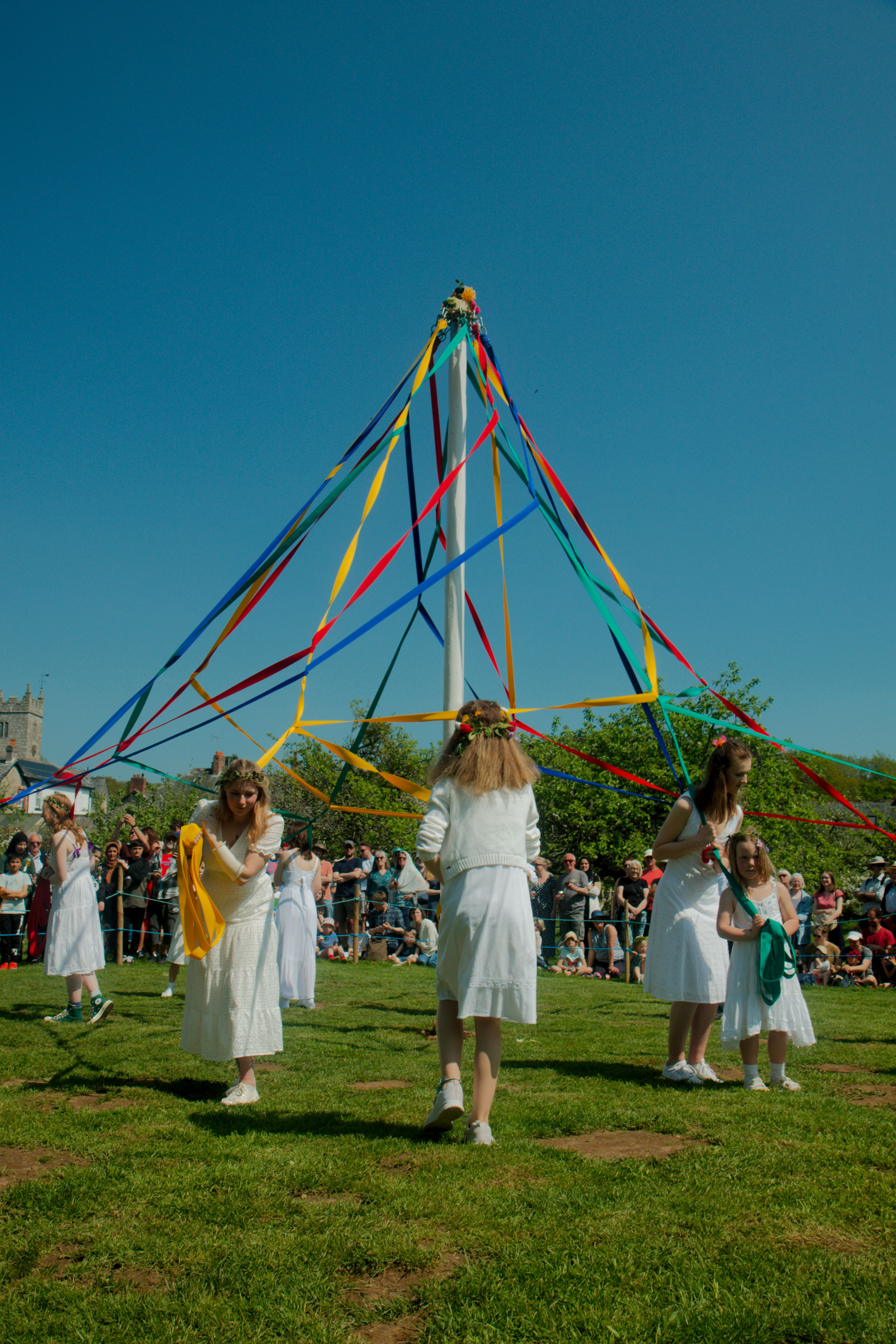
Maypole in Lustleigh in Spider's Web pattern

The Lustleigh May Day is an annual May Day celebration in the village of Lustleigh, Devon. It involves the traditional maypole dancing, as well as the crowning of a May Queen from the eligible girls of the village. It is generally held on the first Saturday of May.

== History ==
The tradition of going "a-maying" is long held in the United Kingdom, with the association of collecting fresh flowers to crown the "fairest maiden in the village", and dancing round the maypole is also a tradition linked to the coming of spring.

The current version of this was revived by Cecil Torr of Wreyland in 1905, with children parading through the village to Long Tor farm, on a hill above the village, for maypole dancing and traditional fete games such as bowling for a pig. This corrected what Torr saw as an anomaly of the village children doing maypole dancing at the flower show and other village events, but not actually on May Day.

There is a May-day festival here, for which I am responsible. There used to be dancing round the May-pole at the flower-show and other festivals, but none upon May-day itself; and I put an end to that anomaly. The children at Lustleigh school—boys and girls—elect one of the girls as Queen, and her name is carved upon a rock on the hill behind this house. Then on May-day the Queen walks in procession under a canopy of flowers carried by four of the boys, her crown and sceptre being carried by two others; then come her maids of honour; and then all the other children of the school, most of them carrying flowers in garlands or on staves. The procession winds along through Lustleigh and through Wreyland, halting at certain places to sing the customary songs, and at last ascends the hill behind here. The Queen is enthroned upon a rock looking down upon the May-pole: the crown of flowers is placed upon her head, and the arum-lily sceptre in her hand: the maids of honour do their homage, laying their bouquets at her feet; and the four-and-twenty dancers perform their dance before her. Then comes the serious business of the day—the children’s tea. This year, 1917, there was a shortage of cereals; but I saved the situation with two hundred hard-boiled eggs.

— Cecil Torr, Small Talk at Wreyland Vol I

The 1939 May Day was postponed by a week, due to an outbreak of sickness at the village school.

The event was originally held on the second Thursday, being during the week to allow the school children of the village school to take part. From at least the 1950s, the event was moved to a Saturday.

The 1959 May Queen, Christine Moore, fell from the rock following her crowning, but was ultimately unhurt.

There is also a long tradition of morris dancing accompanying the event.

In 2020, during the COVID-19 pandemic, the in-person event had to be cancelled, and a virtual May Day was held. The May Queen was crowned in person along with the 2021 and 2022 queens during the 2022 event.

== May day rock and throne ==
Since the 1905 revival, part of the Lustleigh celebration is the carving of the name of the May Queen on to a granite boulder. Two rocks have been used for this purpose, the original one on private land (then owned by Cecil Torr) on the hillside above the village, and latterly in the 'Town Orchard' in the village centre.

=== Original rock at Long Tor ===
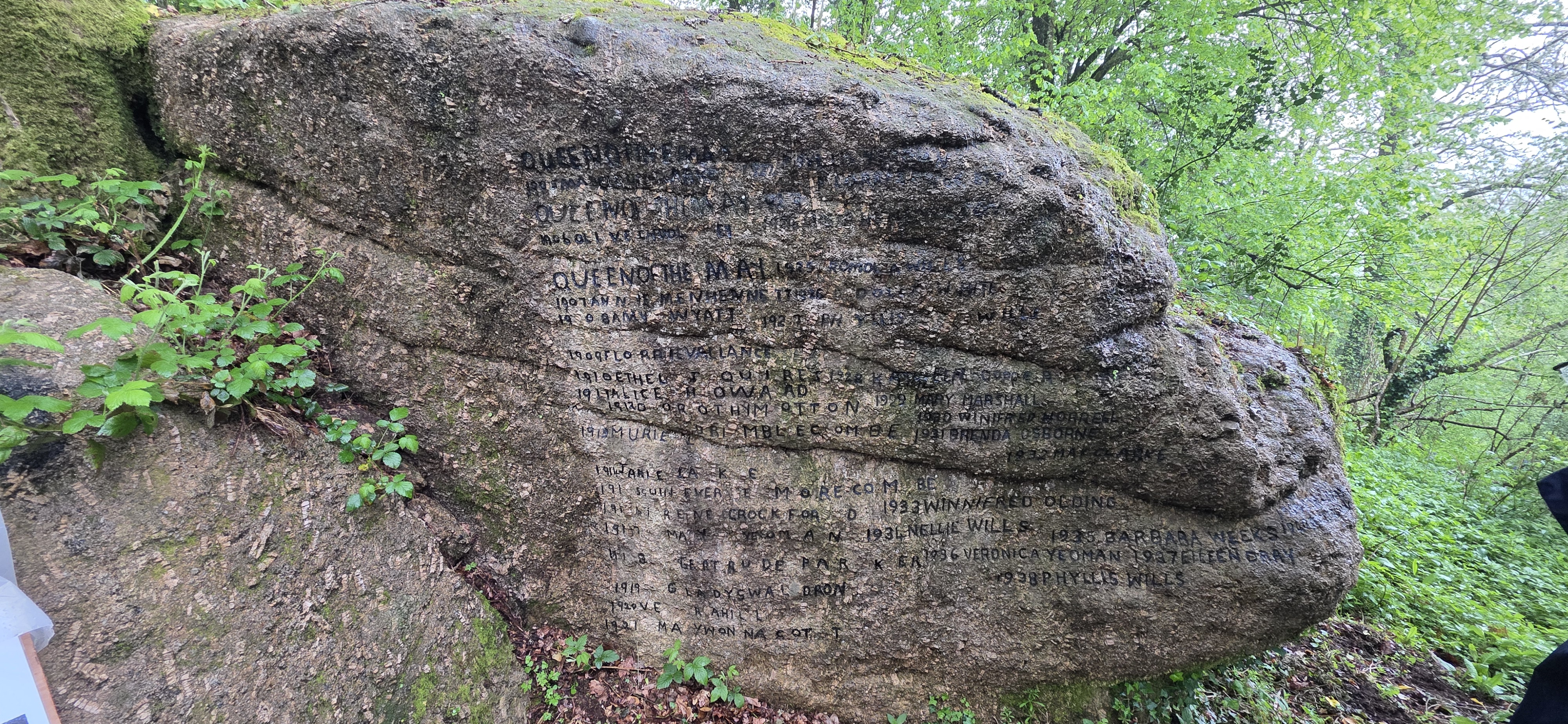
Original rock used to carve names of May Queens for Lustleigh May Day from 1905 to 1940

The names of all the May Queens from 1905 to the second world war are carved on the rock at Long Tor, on the hill above Cecil Torr's house at Wreyland.

At the time it was used, all of Torr's Wreyland estate was within the Bovey Tracey parish, despite its proximity to the village. The boundary was moved in 1929, as both Wreyland and Brookfield were annexed to Lustleigh, bringing the rock inside Lustleigh parish.

Over time, the older rock at Long Tor was subject to weathering and by 1977, some of it was indecipherable. The Long Tor rock was restored by the Lustleigh Society in 2025.

=== Current rock at Town Orchard ===
Following the post-war revival, the event moved to the Town Orchard in the village centre, where a new rock was carved, and all May Queens from 1954 to present are engraved upon it.

On top of the granite boulder in the orchard is a granite throne, carved into local granite from Blackenstone Quarry to celebrate the millennium, and bearing the 'MM' mark.

== Participants and format ==
The children who take part are from the village, or connected to it, and are aged between 5 and 15.

The parade takes place with the May Queen leading the procession around the village underneath a canopy of flowers carried by other children, before returning to the May Day rock throne for crowning.

== May Queens ==
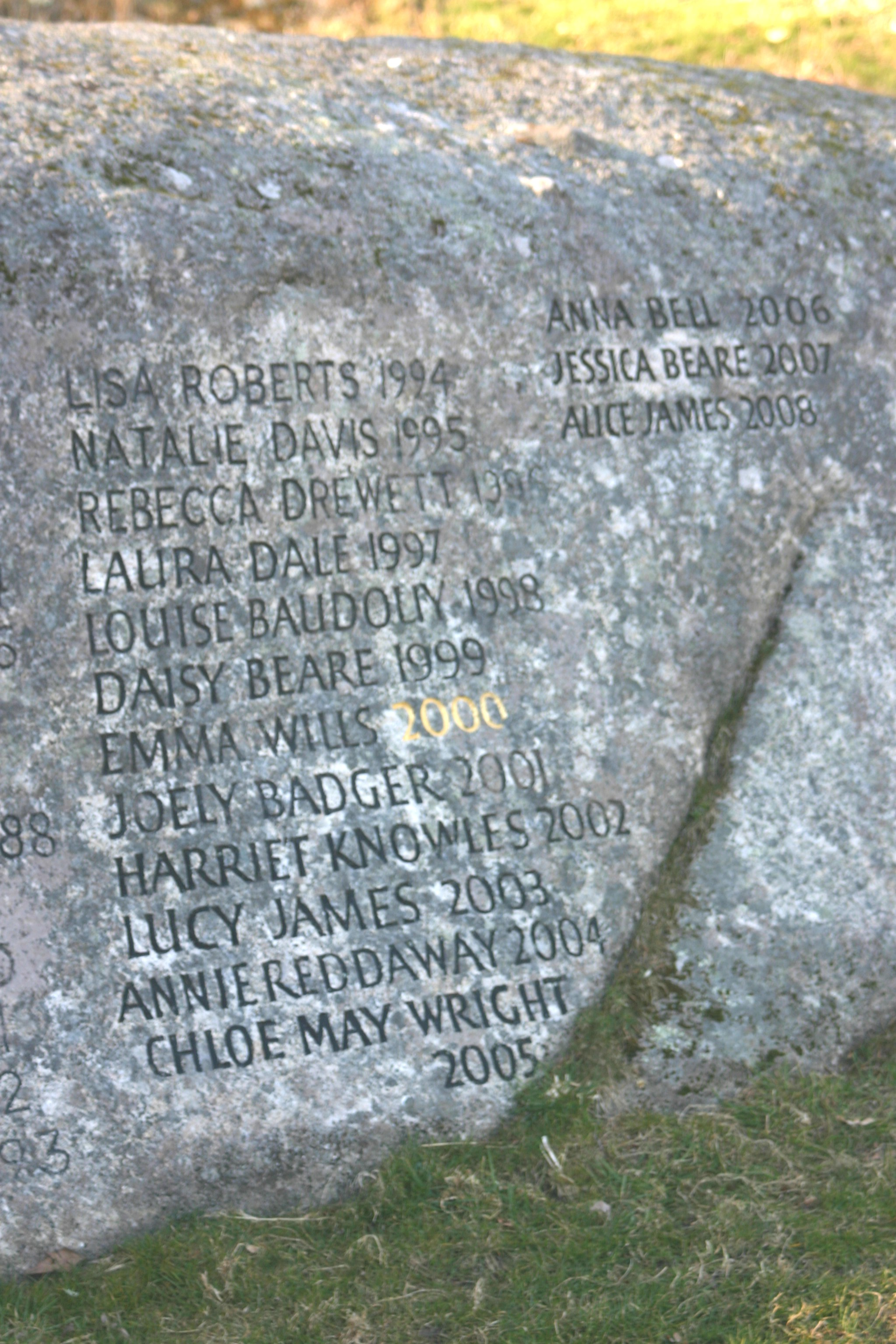
May Queen Rock detail

The May Queens since the revival in 1905 were:

| Year | Queen |
|---|---|
| 1905 | Mabel Bunclarke |
| 1906 | Olive Chudley |
| 1907 | Annie Menhennett |
| 1908 | Amy Wyatt |
| 1909 | Florrie Valance |
| 1910 | Ethel Squires |
| 1911 | Alice Howard |
| 1912 | Dorothy Motton |
| 1913 | Muriel Brimblecombe |
| 1914 | Janie Lake |
| 1915 | Guinevere Morecombe |
| 1916 | Irene Crockford |
| 1917 | May Yeoman |
| 1918 | Gertrude Parker |
| 1919 | Gladys Waldron |
| 1920 | Vera Hill |
| 1921 | May Wonnacott |
| 1922 | Phyllis Yeoman |
| 1923 | Florrie Aggett |
| 1924 | Josephine Wilson |
| 1925 | Romola Wills |
| 1926 | Dolly White |
| 1927 | Phyllis Yeoman |
| 1928 | Kathleen Cooper |
| 1929 | Mary Marshall |
| 1930 | Winifred Horrell |
| 1931 | Brenda Osbourne |
| 1932 | May Clarke |
| 1933 | Winifred Olding |
| 1934 | Nellie Wills |
| 1935 | Barbara Weeks |
| 1936 | Veronica Yeoman |
| 1937 | Eileen Dray |
| 1938 | Phyllis Wills |
| 1939 | Edna Dray |
| 1940 | Rosie Olding |
| 1941 - 1953 | No Ceremony |
| 1954 | Gillian Williams |
| 1955 | Myra Brock |
| 1956 | Patricia Powell |
| 1957 | Janet Horrell |
| 1958 | Helen Beard |
| 1959 | Christine Moore |
| 1960 | Iona Jones |
| 1961 | Jayne Nelson |
| 1962 | Jennifer Perry |
| 1963 | Ruth Matthews |
| 1964 | Carola Woodger |
| 1965 | Jacqueline Kennett |
| 1966 | Patricia Johnson |
| 1967 | Angela Woodger |
| 1968 | Vivienne Jenkin |
| 1969 | Suzanna Beaumont |
| 1970 | Jane Aggett |
| 1971 | Wendy Harvey |
| 1972 | Julie Germon |
| 1973 | Diane Aggett |
| 1974 | Caroline Williams |
| 1975 | Annette Stephens |
| 1976 | Catherine Beaumont |
| 1977 | Debbie Seabrook |
| 1978 | Heather Wright |
| 1979 | Julie Osborne |
| 1980 | Susan Aggett |
| 1981 | Rebecca French |
| 1982 | Jeanette Palmer |
| 1983 | Lisa Rowe |
| 1984 | Debbie Goodfellow |
| 1985 | Sarah Jane Lilley |
| 1986 | Carolyn Tapson |
| 1987 | Salley Ann Lilley |
| 1988 | Rebecca Merriott |
| 1989 | Kim Hopwood |
| 1990 | Coralie Olver |
| 1991 | Abigail Mabey |
| 1992 | Katie Jacoby |
| 1993 | Simone Olver |
| 1994 | Lisa Roberts |
| 1995 | Natalie Davis |
| 1996 | Rebecca Drewett |
| 1997 | Laura Dale |
| 1998 | Louise Baudouy |
| 1999 | Daisy Beare |
| 2000 | Emma Wills |
| 2001 | Joely Badger |
| 2002 | Harriet Knowles |
| 2003 | Lucy James |
| 2004 | Annie Reddaway |
| 2005 | Chloe May Wright |
| 2006 | Anna Bell |
| 2007 | Jessica Beare |
| 2008 | Alice James |
| 2009 | Kirsty Heather |
| 2010 | Bryony Bell |
| 2011 | Lauren Heather |
| 2012 | Celia Coleman |
| 2013 | Abigail Pelling |
| 2014 | Harmony Bidder |
| 2015 | Abigail Carroll |
| 2016 | Talia Sullivan |
| 2017 | Amy Jaggs |
| 2018 | Maisie Roper Melland |
| 2019 | Keevie Oaff |
| 2020 | Imogen Woodcock |
| 2021 | Isla McCabe |
| 2022 | Arabella Kennaird-Melling |
| 2023 | Aurelia Fanshawe |
| 2024 | Bridie Gregson |
| 2025 | Eve Rose Whitehead |
| 2026 | Holly Skilton |
