= May devotions to the Blessed Virgin Mary =

Marian devotions held in the Catholic Church in May

May devotions to the Blessed Virgin Mary refer to special Marian devotions held in the Catholic Church during the month of May honoring Mary, mother of Jesus, as "the Queen of May". These services may take place inside or outside. A "May Crowning" is a traditional Roman Catholic ritual that occurs in the month of May.

== Origins ==
A number of traditions link the month of May to Mary. Alfonso in the thirteenth century wrote in his Cantigas de Santa Maria about the special honoring of Mary during specific dates in May. Eventually, the entire month was filled with special observances and devotions to Mary.

The origin of the conventional May devotion is still relatively unknown. Herbert Thurston identifies the seventeenth century as the earliest instance of the adoption of the custom of consecrating the month of May to the Blessed Virgin by special observances. It is certain that this form of Marian devotion began in Italy. Around 1739, witnesses speak of a particular form of Marian devotion in May in Grezzano near Verona. In 1747 the Archbishop of Genoa recommended the May devotion as a devotion for the home. Specific prayers for them were promulgated in Rome in 1838.

According to Frederick Holweck, the May devotion in its present form originated at Rome where Father Latomia of the Roman College of the Society of Jesus, to counteract infidelity and immorality among the students, made a vow at the end of the eighteenth century to devote the month of May to Mary. From Rome, the practice spread to the other Jesuit colleges and thence to nearly every Catholic church of the Latin rite. In Rome by 1813, May devotions were held in as many as twenty churches. From Italy, May devotions soon spread to France. In Belgium, the May devotions, at least as a private devotion, were already known by 1803. The tradition of honoring Mary in a month-long May devotion spread eventually around the Roman Catholic world in the nineteenth century together with a month-long devotion to Jesus in June and the Rosary in October.

== May devotions ==
In his 1965 encyclical, Mense Maio, Pope Paul VI identified the month of May as an opportune time to incorporate special prayers for peace into traditional May devotions.

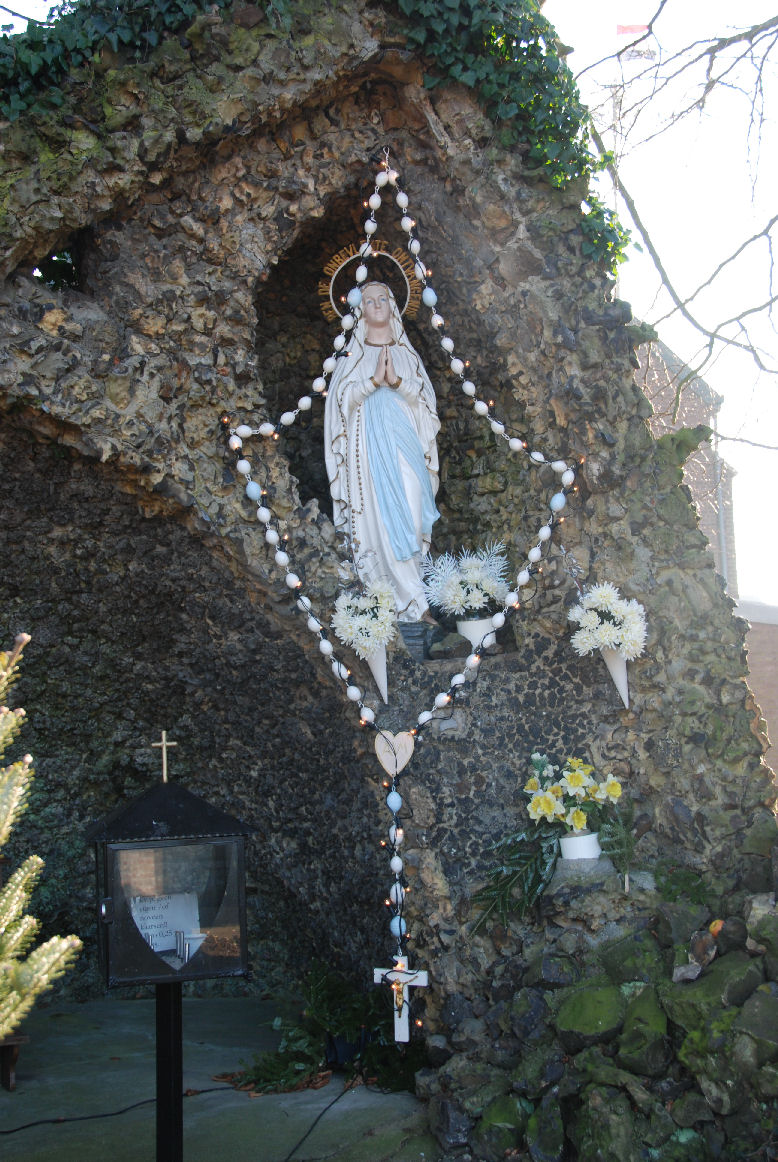
Marian devotion of Rosary

There is no firm structure as to the content of a May devotion. It usually includes the singing of Marian anthems, readings from scriptures, and a sermon. Catholics offer Mary in May: pilgrimages, visits to churches dedicated to her, little sacrifices in her honor, periods of study and well-finished work offered up to her, and a more attentive recitation of the rosary.

The last devotion on May 31 is often followed by a solemn procession, during which a statue or portrait of the Virgin Mary is carried back into the church. Some May devotions may take place outside or in a dedicated special place.

=== Family Devotions ===
One particular practice characteristic of May devotions is the May Altar, whether in a church or as a "house altar" in the home. Marian devotions such as the rosary may take place within the family around this altar consisting of a table with a Marian picture, candles, and decorated with many May flowers The custom of the May Altar stems from southern European countries. With the development of May Altars in churches, the custom spread to set up this type of "altar" also in the home.

This specific devotion has been supported by several popes including Pope Pius XII in his encyclical Ingruentium malorum:

- The custom of the family recitation of the Holy Rosary is a most efficacious means. What a sweet sight – most pleasing to God – when, at eventide, the Christian home resounds with the frequent repetition of praises in honor of the High Queen of Heaven! Then the Rosary, recited in the family, assembled before the image of the Virgin, in an admirable union of hearts, the parents and their children, who come back from their daily work. It unites them piously with those absent and those dead. It links all more tightly in a sweet bond of love, with the most Holy Virgin, who, like a loving mother, in the circle of her children, will be there bestowing upon them an abundance of the gifts of concord and family peace.

== Mary, Queen of May ==
Pope Pius XII, recognizing traditional precedents, proclaimed the "Queenship of Mary" through his encyclical, Ad Caeli Reginam.

While May devotions may differ in various countries, the Marian title "Queen of May" exists in several countries as manifested in Marian songs. In English speaking countries such as England, Ireland and the United States a Marian hymn uses the following text:

Hail Virgin, dearest Mary! Our lovely Queen of May! O spotless, blessed Lady, Our lovely Queen of May. Your children, humbly bending, Surround your shrine...

In German-speaking countries, the equivalent term is Maienkönigin ("May-Queen"):

Maria Maienkönigin, wir kommen dich zu grüßen. O holde Freudenspenderin, sieh uns zu deinen Füßen.
(Mary, Queen of May, we come to greet you. O dear donor of joy, look at us at your feet.)

Another similar song greets Mary, the queen of May, who is greeted by the month of May.

Another well-known Marian "Queen of May" song ends with the words:

- O Mary we crown thee with blossoms today!
- Queen of the Angels and Queen of the May.
- O Mary we crown thee with blossoms today,
- Queen of the Angels and Queen of the May.

=== May crownings ===
In Eastern churches, crowning Mary was associated with adding ornamentation to an icon of Mary, sometimes as simple as adding additional gold trim. Perhaps in homage to this, Pope Clement VIII added two crowns to the icon of Salus Populi Romani in the Saint Mary Major Basilica in Rome. The crowns were eventually lost, but were replaced by Gregory XVI in 1837 in a rite that was to become the standard practice for crowning.

“Images are venerated ‘not because of a belief that these images themselves possess anything of divinity or power, but because the honor shown them is directed to the prototypes they represent’ (Council of Trent, session 25)” [BB, no. 1258].

Parishes and private groups often process and crown an image of the Blessed Virgin Mary with flowers. This often is referred to as a “May Crowning.” This rite may be done on solemnities and feasts of the Blessed Virgin Mary, or other festive days, and offers the Church a chance to reflect on Mary’s role in the history of salvation. In some countries, it takes place on or about May 1, however, in many United States Catholic parishes, it frequently takes place on Mother's Day.

The custom fell out of vogue in many places during the 1970s–80s, but has since made a comeback along with many other traditional Catholic practices. An image or likeness of the Blessed Virgin Mary is ceremonially crowned to signify her as Queen of Heaven and the Mother of God.

Today, May crownings occur in many Roman Catholic parishes, Evangelical-Lutheran parishes of Evangelical Catholic churchmanship, and some Anglican parishes of Anglo-Catholic churchmanship, as well as homes with the crowning of a statue of Mary. There is considerable flexibility regarding the rite, and it can be adapted to many different circumstances and situations depending on whether the crowning is done in a parish, a school or classroom, or even in the family. The rite may consist of hymns, prayers, and perhaps an act of consecration to Our Lady.

The climax of the celebration is the moment when the one of those present places a crown of flowers on Mary's head accompanied by a traditional hymn to the Blessed Mother. The ceremony usually takes place with young girls in dresses carrying flowers (traditionally hawthorn) to adorn the statue. One of the girls (often the youngest) carries a crown of flowers or an actual golden crown on a cushion for placement by the May Queen (often the oldest girl) on the statue. The flowers are replaced throughout the month to keep them fresh.

The Coronation of the Virgin became a popular subject in art.

== Flores de Mayo ==
In the Philippines, Mary is fêted in May with the Flores de Mayo ("Flowers of May"), where devotees collect colourful flowers with which to decorate the altars of parish churches and visitas (cf. chancel flowers). Catholic communities often congregate in the afternoons to pray the Rosary, offer flowers to an image of the Virgin Mary, and share homemade delicacies and snacks. In more formal processions, children and adults wear their Sunday best, singing and dancing to welcome the rains that will water the new crops.

The celebration is highlighted by the Santacruzan, a ritual pageant celebrating the Finding of the Holy Cross. Young ladies, often called reynas (“queens”), are chosen to represent biblical figures such as Judith, Marian titles taken from the Litany of Loreto (e.g. Rosa Mística), and other traditional or allegorical figures (e.g. Reyna Emperatríz, Reyna Mora). The reynas, dressed in their finery and bearing various attributes, walk through the community escorted by young men or boys. The Reyna Elena, representing Saint Helena, is the last and grandest; the most beautiful woman in the pageant, she bears a cross or crucifix symbolising the True Cross, as she is escorted by a young boy representing Emperor Constantine. Participants walk under arches, often carried and decorated with flowers or symbols of bounty.

The Santacruzan custom in the Philippines is thus a fusion of both the May Marian devotions and celebrations surrounding Roodmas, which was once observed liturgically on 3 May.

=== In Lithuania ===
In 1853, May devotions arrived in Lithuania. It is thought that they were introduced in Samogitia by the initiative of bishop Motiejus Valančius. Later, at the end of the century the May devotions to the Blessed Virgin Mary began to be sung in Vilnius.

May devotions to the Blessed Virgin Mary are also called Mojava. They are sung not only in churches, but also in the homes of the faithful, – villagers and townspeople sing together after their day’s labours. For the occasion of the May devotions a small altar with a statue of Mary is prepared at home.

Mojava are also sung during the opening celebration of the Museum of Samogitian village.

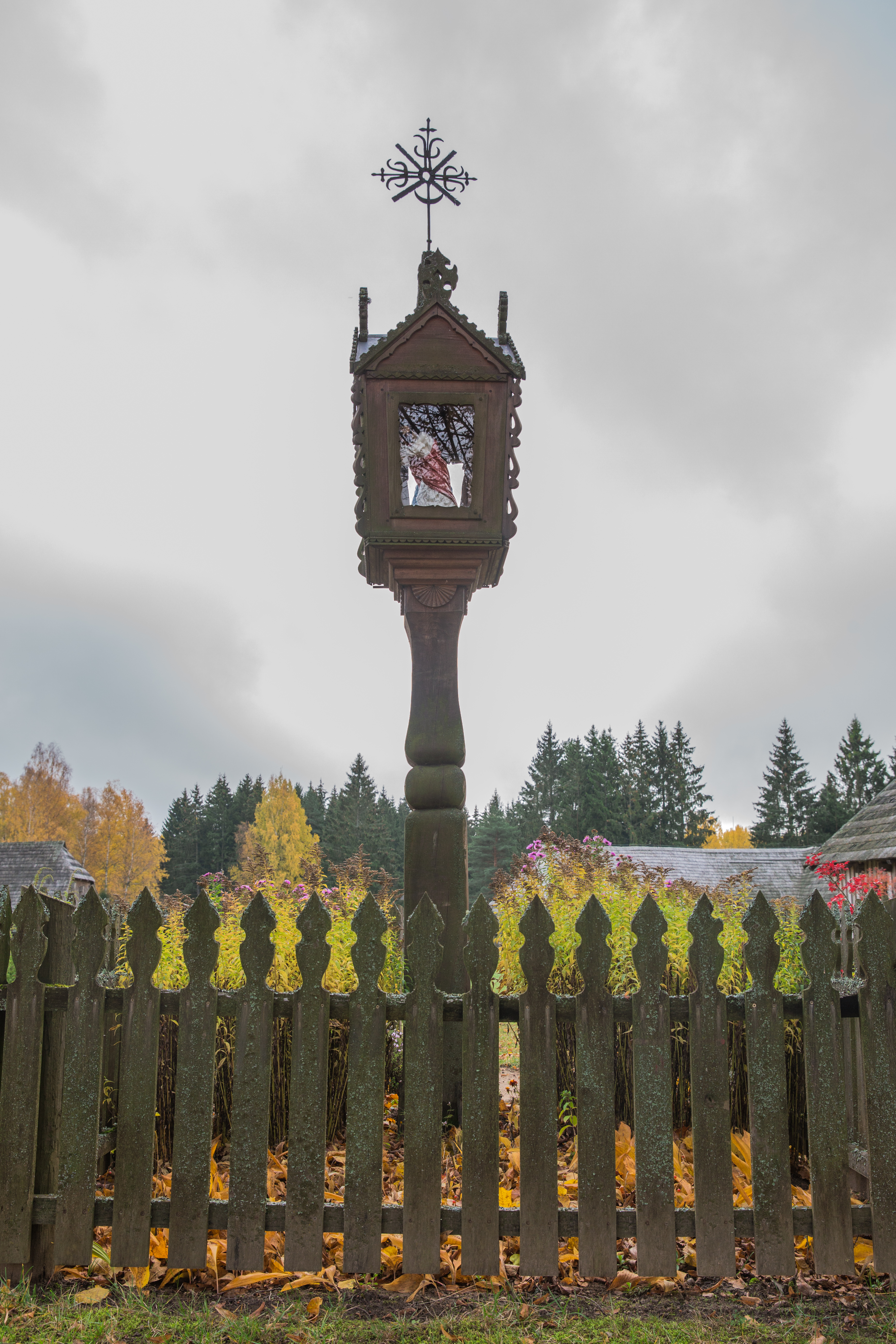

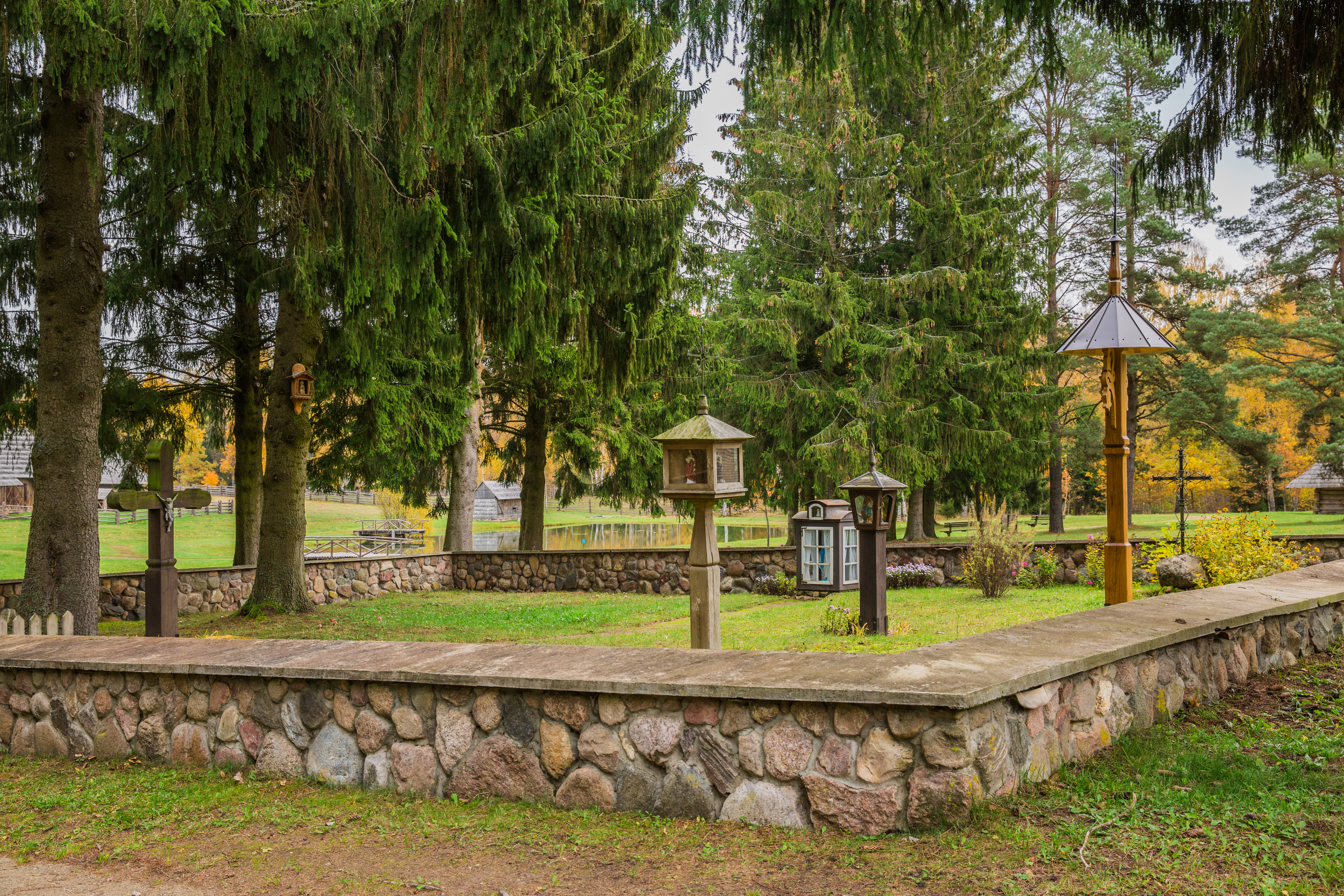

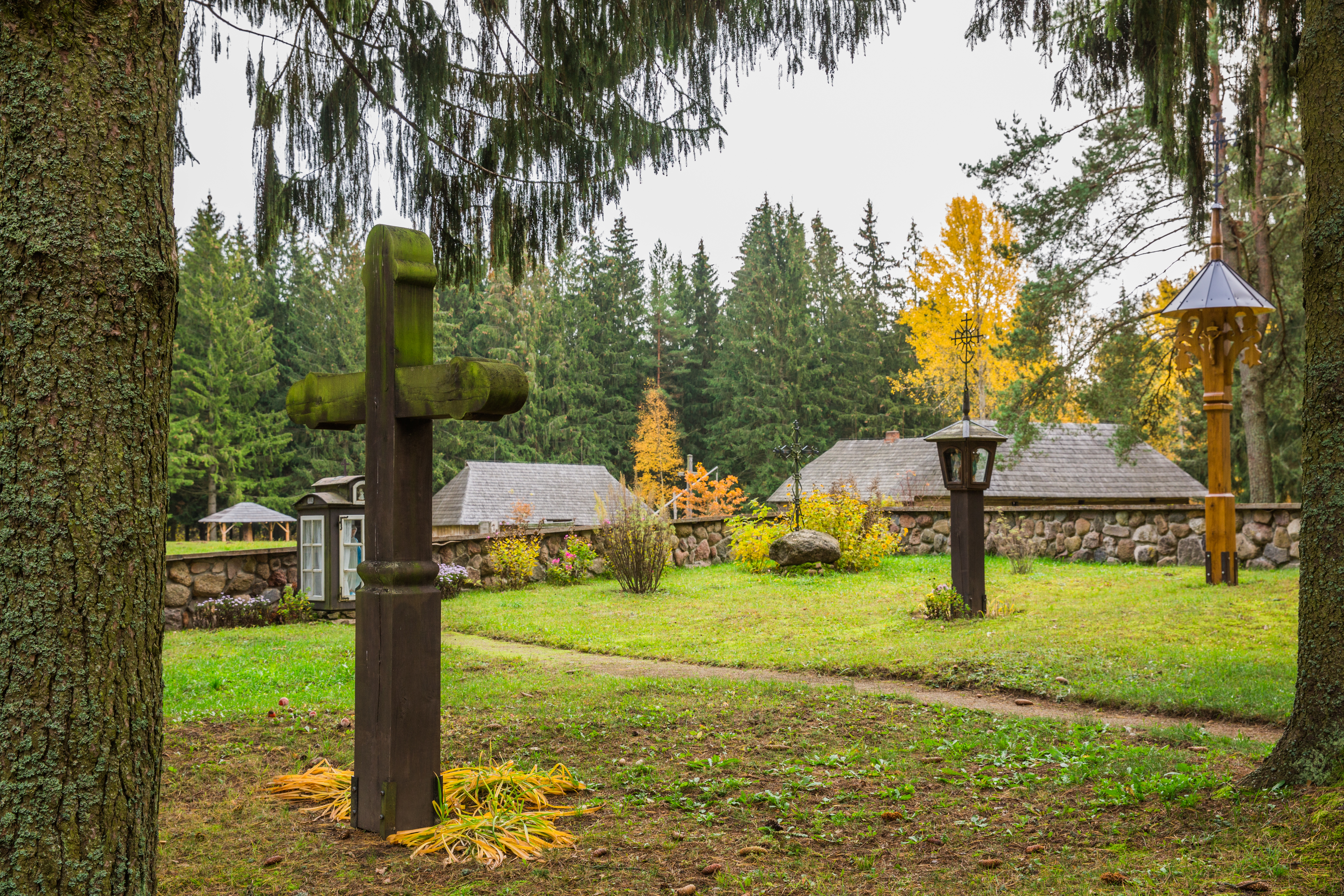

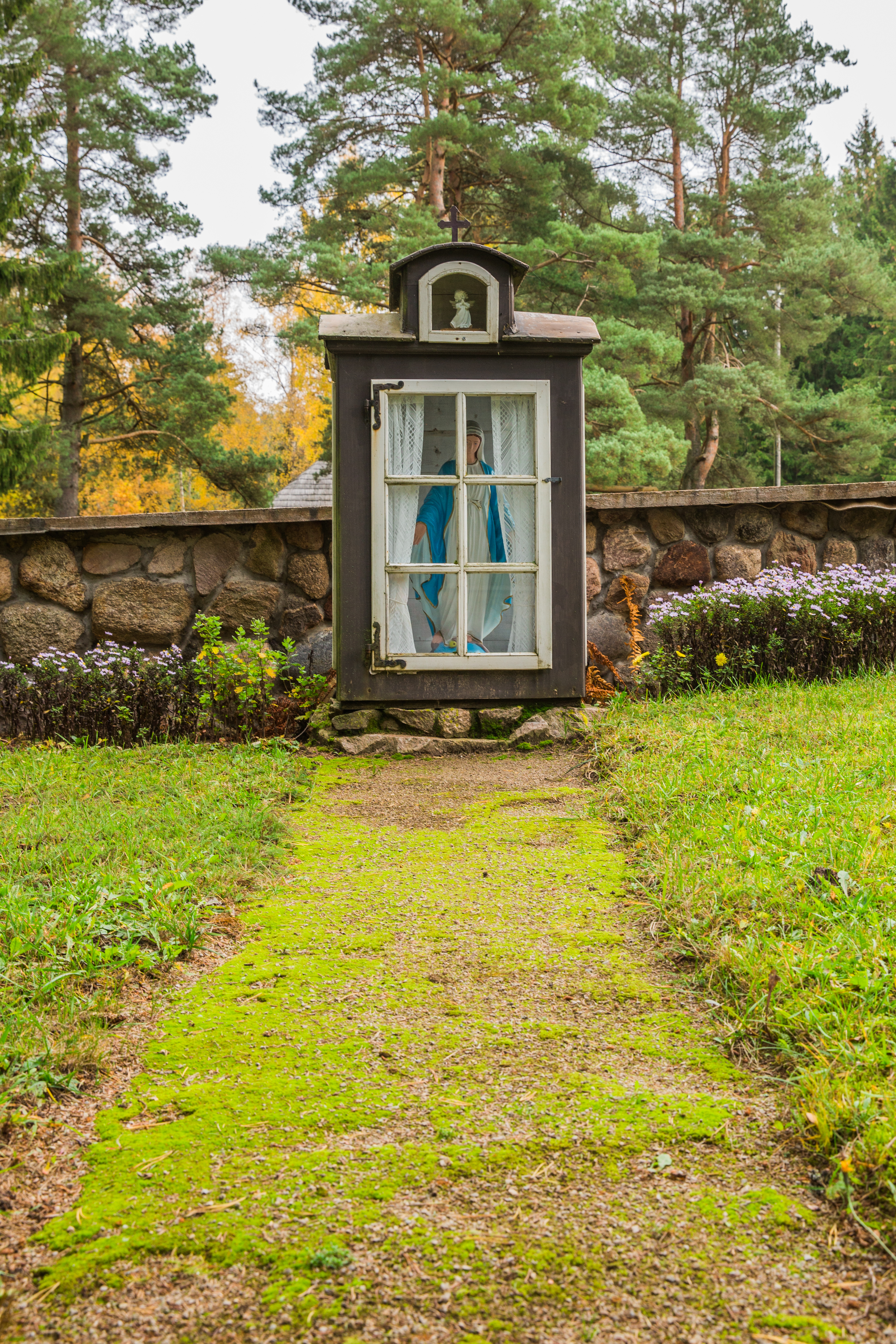

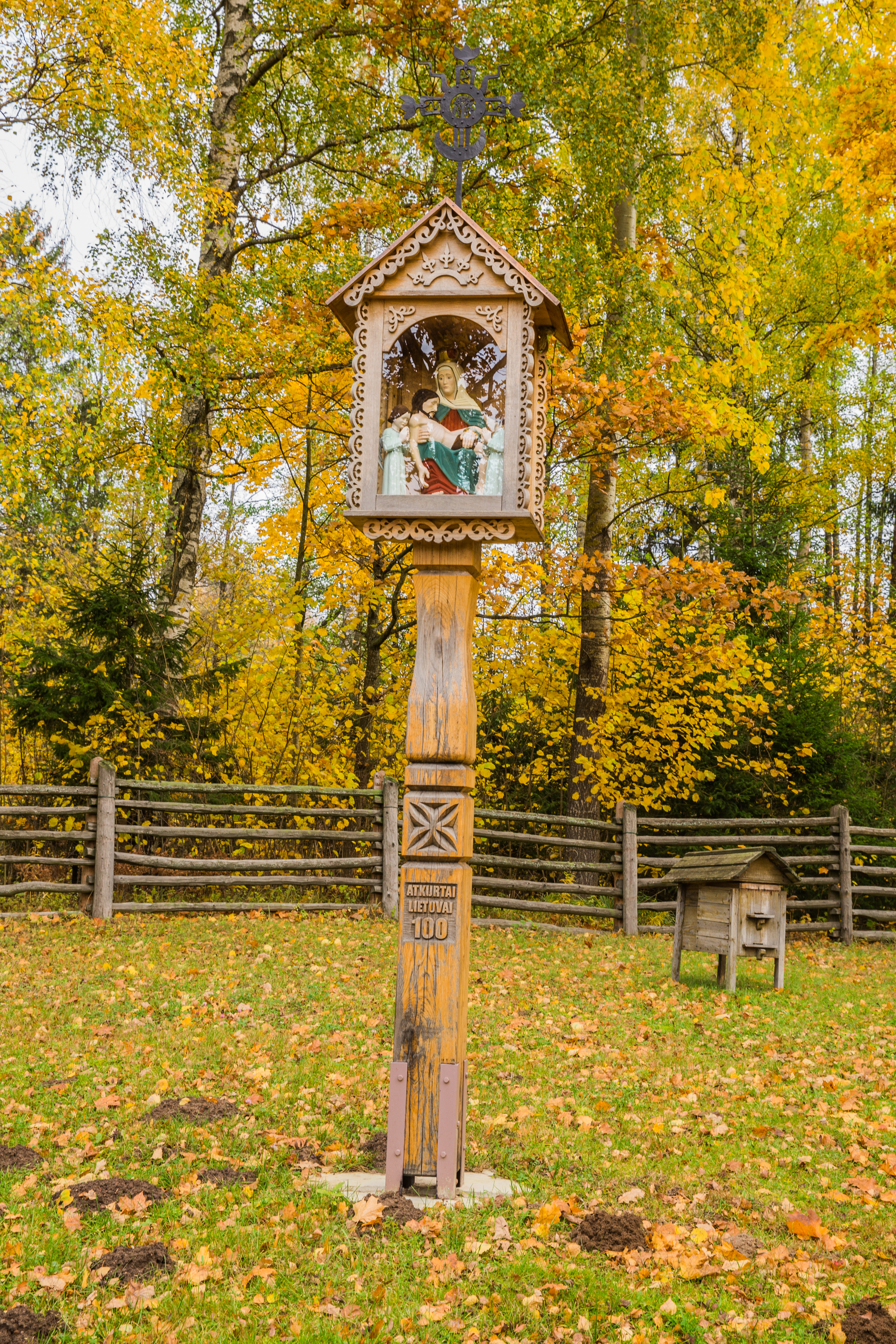

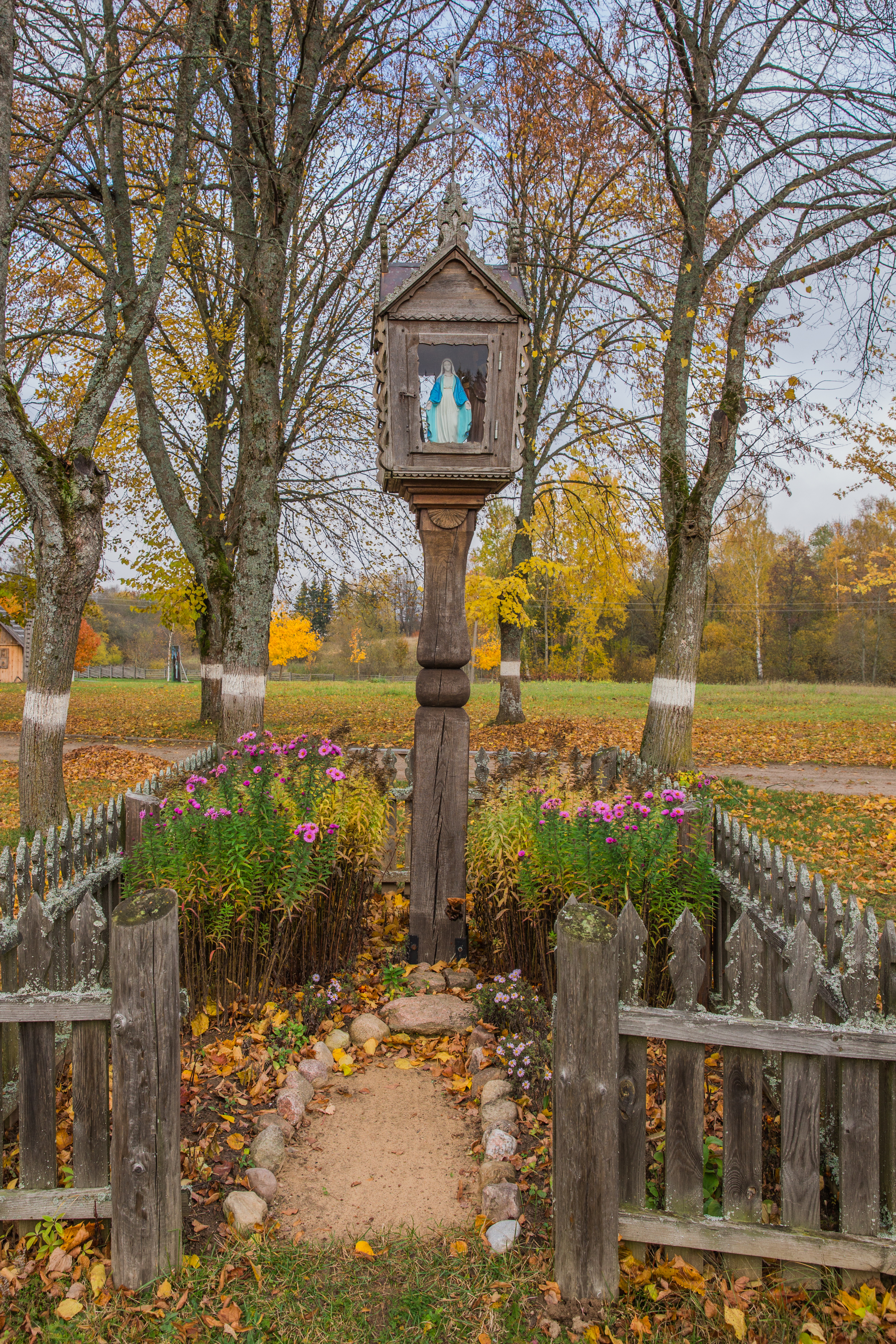

== Mary Gardens ==
Floral imagery from scripture and nature has been applied to Mary in the writings of the Church Fathers and in the liturgy, providing the foundation in tradition for the subsequent naming of hundreds of flowers for Mary's life, mysteries, virtues, excellences and divine prerogatives in the popular religious folk traditions of the medieval countrysides – as recorded by botanists, folklorists and lexicographers. The practice of honoring Mary with flowers originated among monasteries and convents in medieval Europe. During the Middle Ages, people saw reminders of Mary in the flowers and herbs growing around them. The first reference to an actual garden dedicated to Mary is from the life of St. Fiacre, Irish patron saint of gardening, who planted and tended a garden around the oratory to Our Lady he built at his famous hospice for the poor and infirm in France in the seventh century.

In the East floral gardens were introduced especially for the floral decorations for Mother Mary in May. Portuguese relations with Thamizh Naadu (now a part of Indian Union) started May Devotions in the seventeenth century and Catholic families started developing Floral Gardens in every home. European flowering plants were introduced in India during this time. Ezha Maarthandan Thirupappur, a Catholic crown prince of Ezhasa Naadu who was heading an Army in the name of Mother Mary has written that 'the celebrations of Mother Mary dominated that of our Lord Jesus, and hence June Devotion for our Lord had to be fiercely implemented'. He also has written that he had to curtail some of the programs associated with May Devotions in Ezhasa Naadu and his parent Kingdom Vaenaadu.

== See also ==
- Blessed Virgin Mary
- Consecration and entrustment to Mary
- Hymns to Mary
- Coronation of the Virgin
- Queen of Heaven
- Canonical coronations
- Oktav, double-octave in honour of our Lady of Luxembourg
