= Flores de Mayo =

Traditional Philippine celebration

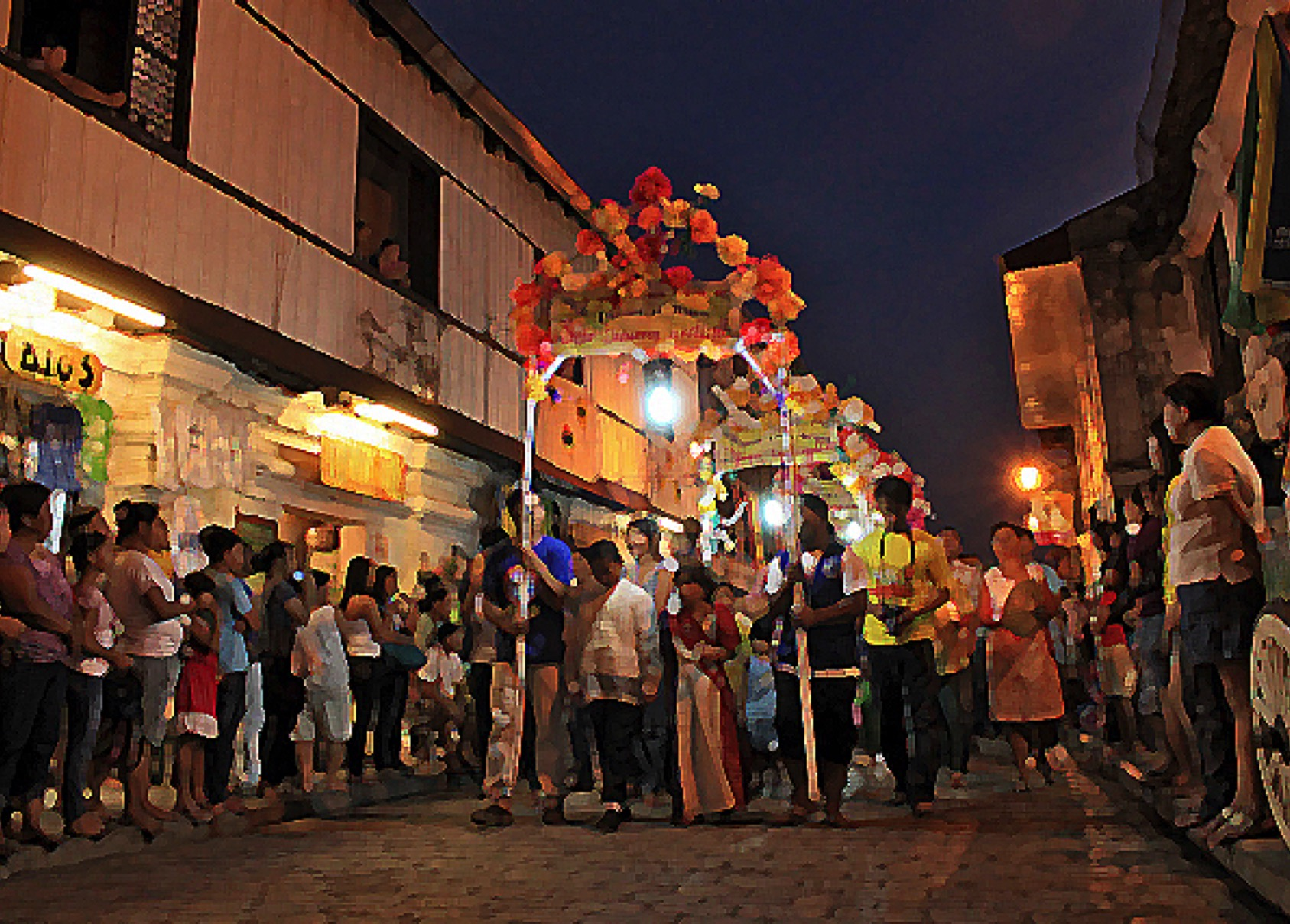
- Santacruzan held during Flores de Mayo
- Observed by: Philippines
- Type: Religious/Cultural
- Significance: May devotions to the Blessed Virgin Mary
- Celebrations: Santacruzan
- Frequency: Annual

Flores de Mayo (Spanish for "flowers of May") is a festival held in the Philippines in the month of May. It is one of the May devotions to the Blessed Virgin Mary and lasts for the entire month.

The Santacruzan (from the Spanish santa cruz, "holy cross") is the ritual pageant held on the last day of the Flores de Mayo. It honours the finding of the True Cross by Helena of Constantinople (known as Reyna Elena) and Constantine the Great. Its connection with May stems from the May 3 date of Roodmas, which Pope John XXIII deleted in the 1960s due to the trend at the time to abolish holy days that were either duplicates or dedicated to ahistorical saints. The Feast of the Exaltation of the Cross on September 14, which commemorates the recovery of the relic by Emperor Heraclius from the Persians instead of the finding by Saint Helena combines that occasion with Roodmas in the present General Roman Calendar.

== Etymology ==
The name of the festival is derived from the Spanish language word flores meaning "flowers." Other names are "Flores de María" ("Flowers of Mary") and "Álay" (Filipino for "offering").

== In the Bicolandia ==
In the Bicol Region, the ritual begins with the recitation of the rosary, and the last day is simply called the "katapusan" which is marked with a Mass, a Santacruzan and procession of the Blessed Virgin Mary.

The traditional Martía with its respective meaning is said after the recitation of the Salve Regina in Spanish and the Litany of Loreto. After the ceremony, simple snacks are given to the children attending. Alabasyón (from the Spanish for "praising") is the term for prayers sung in honour of the Holy Cross.

== In Western and in some parts of Eastern Visayas ==
The towns particularly in Iloilo has their respective puroks or streets and the barangays which has their respective chapel or house of prayer or even in the church where an image of the Virgin Mary is venerated and children gathers to have a simple catechism and teachings about the life and story of Mary, history of Marian apparitions, Christian doctrines and values, holistic values and virtues and other life's teachings. They were also taught some prayers and some songs uniquely recited only during the Flores de Mayo and the children offer some flowers before the image of the Virgin Mary as a symbol of love, affection and veneration. This is a commemoration and reminiscent of the Our Lady of Fatima apparition to the three children which first took place on May 13, 1917. After a while, they were offered some snacks.

Some churches and areas are giving children some paper tickets for actively participating and doing well during the catechism in which at the end of the month of May which also coincides with the end of the Flores de Mayo, the children redeem the value of the tickets which are school supplies ready for the school opening. Until 2019, this was in June, the supplies are brought currently in August or September beginning 2020, depending on the date set by the Department of Education. With the switch of the calendar, the paper ticket tradition among these children also mark one of the final salvos of the school year. Santacruzan is usually held during the last few days of May to coincide with the end of the catechism for children.

== In the Katagalugan ==
Amongst the Tagalog people, the custom began after the proclamation of the dogma of the Immaculate Conception in 1854 and after the circa 1867 publication of Mariano Sevilla's translation of the devotional "Flores de María" ("Flowers of Mary"), also known by its longer title "Mariquít na Bulaclac nasa Pagninilaynilay sa Buong Buannang Mayo ay Inihahandog nañg mañga Devoto cay María Santísima" ("Beautiful Flowers that in the Meditations in the Whole Month of May are Presented by Devotees to Mary Most Holy").

One famous May tradition in Batangas (particularly in Lipa) is the Luglugan, or nightly devotion and party honouring the Virgin Mary. Held in structures called tuklóng, devotees offer flowers and prayers to an image of Mary every night. After the prayer, the Hermanos or Hermanas for the day will give away treats to the participants, followed by the party. The Luglugan lasts for a month until the Tapusan ("ending") which is marked with a Mass, a Santacruzan and procession of the Blessed Virgin Mary, and capped with a final Luglugan that lasts until the following morning.

=== The Santacruzan ===
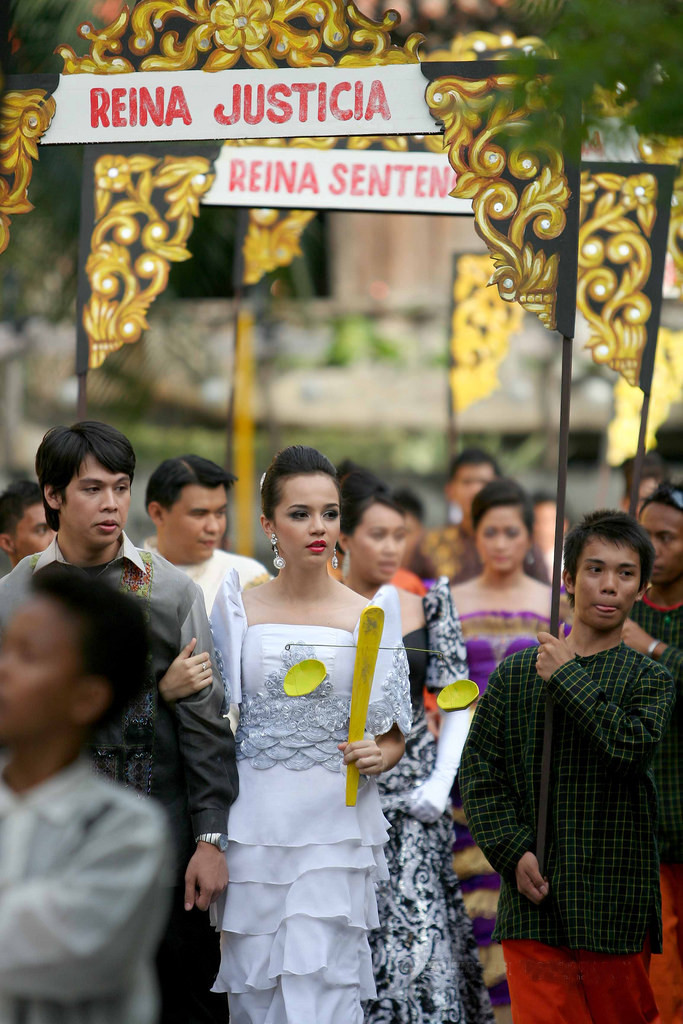
Santacruzan

A Santacruzan is a religio-historical beauty pageant held in many cities, towns, and even in small communities throughout the Philippines during the month of May. One of the most colorful aspects of this festival, the pageant depicts the finding of the True Cross by Queen Helena, mother of Constantine the Great. Many movie and television personalities participate in the events and are featured in major santacruzan. This festival became part of Filipino traditions identified with youth, love, and romance.

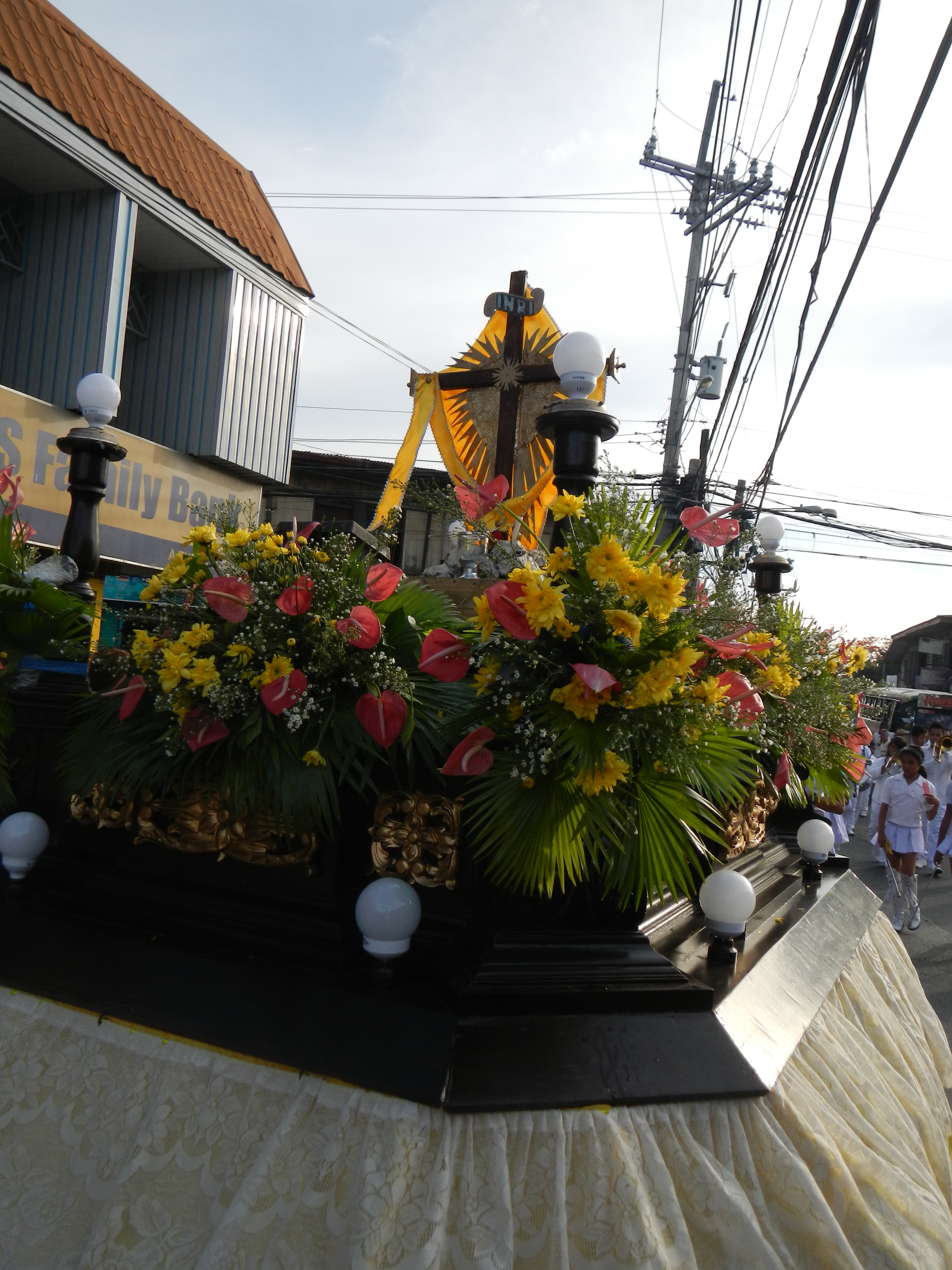
A replica of the True Cross in solemn procession during the Flores de Mayo in Noveleta, Cavite

Prior to the Santacruzan, a novena is held in honour of the Holy Cross. The procession itself commemorates the search of the Holy Cross by Reyna (H)Elena and her son, Emperor Constantine. It is said to have roots in the joyous thanksgiving celebrations that followed the finding of the Holy Cross in Jerusalem and its translation to Constantinople (now Istanbul).

==== General order of the procession ====
The participants of this procession would follow this typical arrangement:

    - The Cross or the Image of Saint Helena with the Cross is used for Santa Cruzan, while the Image of Blessed Mother is used for Flores de Mayo that is the distinction of the two festivals but some organizers mixed the two festivals together in one celebration, Flores and Santa Cruzan.

===== Additional titles (Pamayanan or communities) =====
Each figure in this group refers to a Marian apparition, popular title (unless mentioned below) or Marian dogma.

1. Pamayanan Inmaculada – She is the representation of the Immaculate Conception, principal protectress of the republic. Also known as "Pamayanang Caysaysay" because of the related title Our Lady of Caysasay.
2. Pamayanan La Naval – She is the representation of Our Lady of the Rosary. Often, she carries a rosary. She is included in the Santacruzan because of her title Queen of the Holy Rosary, and because of the miraculous story of the victory of the Catholics over the Turkish Muslims in the Battle of Lepanto on October 7, 1571, and the Victory of the Filipinos and Spaniards over the Dutch on the Battle of La Naval de Manila from March 15, 1646 – October 4, 1646. Also known as "Pamayanang Manaoag" and "Pamayanang Piat" because of the related titles Our Lady of Manaoag and Our Lady of Piat.
3. Pamayanan Asunción – She is the representation of the Assumption of Mary.
4. Pamayanan Del Carmen – She is the representation of Our Lady of Mount Carmel who appeared to Saint Simon Stock in Mount Carmel in Palestine on July 16, 1251. She carries the scapular of Mount Carmel. She is the first ever title in the Santacruzan, named after Our Lady of Mount Carmel, who kept the promise of the Brown scapular, saying "Whosoever dies, vested in this scapular, shall never suffer fires of hell". Also known in Cebu as "Pamayanang La Limpia".
5. Pamayanan Dela Paz – She is the representation of Our Lady of Peace. She carries a dove and is included in the Santacruzan Because of her sister title, Queen of Peace. She is also known as "Pamayanang EDSA" in honour of the EDSA Shrine and the historic EDSA Revolution and "Pamanayang Antipolo" because of the related title Our Lady of Peace and Good Voyage.
6. Pamayanan Fátima – She is the representation of Our Lady of Fátima who appeared to three children of Fátima, Portugal, namely Saints Francisco and Jacinta Marto, and Venerable Sister Lúcia on May 13, 1917. She carries a rosary or wears a crucifix necklace.
7. Pamayanan Lourdes – She is the representation of Our Lady of Lourdes who appeared to Saint Bernadette Soubirous on February 11, 1858. She carries a large rosary.
8. Pamayanang Guadalupe – She is the representation of Our Lady of Guadalupe who Appeared to Saint Juan Diego on December 9, 1531. Often, her outfit includes native designs as she is the country's secondary patroness.
9. Pamayanang Peña de Francia/Peñafrancia – She represents Our Lady of Peñafrancia who appeared to Simón Vela on May 13, 1434, and whose devotion in the country dates from 1712. She is Patroness of the Bicol Region and hers is one of the oldest devotions in the nation.
10. Pamayanang Perpetual Help/Prompto Soccoro – She represents Our Lady of Perpetual Help. Indirectly she honours the icon of Our Lady of Prompt Succor of Binondo, one of the first Marian devotions in the Philippines and a popular title among Chinese-Filipinos in Manila's Binondo district.

===== Biblical and Historical Figures, with Traditional Personifications =====
1. Matusalén (Methuselah) – This Biblical figure mentioned in 1 Chronicles and the Gospel of Luke is presented as an allegory of the transience of the world, which will be like the dust he is toasting in a pan over a fire. He is often shown as bent with extreme age and riding a cart. Some renditions instead have him walking with a cane.
2. Reina Banderada (Queen with a Banner) – She represents the arrival of Christianity in the Philippines. Often dressed in a long red gown, her traditional attribute is a yellow and/or white pennant. If part of the colour guard, she bears the modern Flag of Vatican City.
3. Reina Aeta (Queen Aeta) – She represents the country's dark-skinned, indigenous peoples such as the Aeta and Ati. These aboriginal groups settled the islands tens of thousands of years before the advent of today's Austronesian majority population. She is sometimes bears of the Philippine Flag if part of the colour guard.
4. Reina Mora (Queen Mooress) – She represents Muslim Filipinos, who are concentrated in Mindanao and large cities such as Manila. Islam predates Christianity in the Philippines by two centuries, and is the country's second-largest religion. Mary is honoured in Islam, and her story is found in the 19th sura (chapter) of the Qur'an. Her dress mimics those of Filipino Muslim ethnic groups, many of which identify as Bangsamoro, and sometimes she has an attitude of confusion and puzzlement at the Christian religion.
5. Reina Juana (Queen Juana) - Representing the historical Hara Humamay, consort of Rajah Humabon, who were among the first baptized Catholics in the Philippines. She symbolises the arrival of Christianity in the islands with the First Masses held in Southern Leyte and Cebu in 1521. She is identified with her image of the Santo Niño de Cebú.
6. Reina de Saba/Reina Sheba (Queen of Sheba) – She represents the unnamed queen who visited King Solomon, and was overwhelmed by his wisdom, power, and riches. She carries a jewellery box. She is part of the pageant as the 13th-century Legenda Aurea narrates how she stopped on a bridge she was crossing, and on bended knee venerated a beam she foretold would become part of the True Cross.
7. Rut y Noemi/Reina Ruth at Reina Naomi (Ruth and Naomi) – She represents the Moabite convert to Judaism, together with her tragic mother-in-law from whom she was inseparable. Ruth is an ancestress of King David, and is one of four women listed in the genealogies of Jesus in the Gospels of Matthew and Luke. Ruth may be portrayed alone by one woman, or with another woman as Naomi.
8. Reina Deborah (Queen Deborah) – She represents Deborah, a prophetess and the only woman among the Biblical judges.
9. Reina Judit (Queen Judith) – She represents the Biblical widow Judith of Bethulia, who saved her city from the Assyrians by beheading their brutal general, Holofernes. Also given the Spanish title "Infanta" (“Princess”), she holds the severed head of Holofernes in one hand, and a sometimes bloodied sword in the other.
10. Reina Esther (Queen Esther) – She represents the Jewish queen of Persia, who spared her people from genocide at the hands of Haman, the royal advisor, by timely intervention with her husband, King Xerxes. She carries a sceptre.
11. Cleopatra – She represents Cleopatra VII Philopator (69–30 BC), the final active pharaoh of Ancient Egypt who was of the Greek Ptolemaic dynasty. Her male escort is often understood to represent the Ancient Roman senator and general Mark Antony (Marco Antonio, 83–30 BC). Her dress is sometimes given Ancient Egyptian designs and motifs.
12. (Reina) Samaritana/Santa Photina (The Female Samaritan) – She represents the Samaritan woman at the well (named in Greek tradition as Φωτεινή Photeiní), whom Christ preached to about the Water of Life. She carries a water jug.
13. Santa Verónica/Reina Verónica – She represents the woman who wiped the face of Jesus who bears her Veil. Following traditional Filipino iconography, her Veil has a miraculous triple imprint of the Holy Face of Jesus instead of one; this comes from the item’s description in the religious epic, the Pasyón.
14. Tres Marías (Three Marys) – Each represents a Mary from among Jesus’ followers, and has an item associated with His Entombment:
  1. Santa María Magdalena/Reina María Magdalena (Mary Magdalene) – She bears a perfume bottle, as Catholic tradition once conflated her with Mary of Bethany, and the woman who anointed and wiped Jesus' feet. As a Myrrhbearer and first witness to the Resurrection, the Church in 2016 declared her Apostola Apostolorum (“Apostle to the Apostles”), elevating her memorial to the rank of feast.
  2. Santa María Cleofe/Reina María Cleofe (Mary, the mother of James, wife of Clopas) – She bears a whisk broom, as tradition holds she swept clean the Holy Sepulchre before Christ was laid in it.
  3. Santa María Salome/Reina María Salome (Mary Salome) – She bears a thurible or bottle, pointing to her role as one of the Myrrhbearers.
15. Santa Marta/Reina Martha (Martha) - Wears an apron and carrying a laundry bag, as she served Jesus in Bethany during His public ministry and so is a patroness of household workers.
16. Reina Fé (Queen Faith) – She represents Faith, the first theological virtue, and carries a cross or crucifix.
17. Reina Esperanza (Queen Hope) – She represents Hope, the second theological virtue, and carries an anchor.
18. Reina Caridad (Queen Charity) – She represents Charity, the third and chief of the theological virtues, and carries a red heart or an image of the Sacred Heart.
19. Reina Sentenciada (Queen Convicted) – She represents Early Christians, particularly virgins, who were persecuted and martyred for the Faith. With hands bound together using ropes or metal chains, she is sometimes escorted by two Roman soldiers.

===== Marian Titles =====
Each figure in this group refers to a title of the Virgin Mary in the Litany of Loreto, or a figure associated with her. They are preceded by eight girls or women, dressed in white gowns as angels, each holding a letter of the Angelic salutation “Ave Maria”.

1. Reina Abogada (Queen Advocate/Lawyer) – Defender of the poor and oppressed, she wears a black mortarboard cap and graduation gown (a shorthand for academic dress), and carries a large book. She is a representation of the title Mary, Help (Advocate) of Christians. Some processions add Reina Doctora (Queen Doctor) to signify high educational attainment; dressed as a physician, she represents the Virgin’s intercession for the ill extolled by the titles Health of the Sick (Salus Infirmorum) and Comforter of the Afflicted (Consolatrix Afflictorum). A recent addition is Reina Migrante (Queen Migrant), representing the title "Solace of Migrants" (Solacium Migrantium) inserted into the Litany by Pope Francis in 2020. This alludes to both Mary's more general protection of migrants and travellers, and specifically the Overseas Filipinos who perform the ritual pageant of the Flores de Mayo across the diaspora. Unlike the two, she either wears casual or corporate attire with a travel bag carried by her.
2. Reina Justícia (Queen Justice) – She is a representation of the title "Mirror of Justice" (Speculum Iustitiæ), whose attributes are the scales of Justice and a sword.
3. Divina Pastora (Divine Shepherdess) – She bears a shepherd's crook or an image of a lamb. She represents her care for Christians as the flock of her Son, Jesus the Good Shepherd.
4. Reina de los Ángeles (Queen of the Angels) – Represents the title Regina Angelorum, and has a bouquet or garland of white or coloured flowers. She is escorted by ladies or children in white (sometimes with angelic wings and halo), representing the Bodiless Powers.
5. Casa de Oro/Bahay na Ginto (House of Gold) – Representing the title Domus Aurea as well as the modern invocation “Queen of Families” (Regina Familiæ), added to the Litany in 1995 by Pope John Paul II. She carries a replica of a bahay kubo or a bahay na bato, honouring Mary's role as the protectress of the family and as a reminder of the Holy Family of Nazareth. A similar role, Madre de la Iglesia/Iná ng Simbahan, represents the title Mater Ecclesiæ ("Mother of the Church"), and is performed by a lady carrying either a picture or replica of a church building to honour Mary's participation in the founding of Christianity.
6. Torre de/ni David (Tower of David) - Representing the title Turris Davidica, she carries a replica bamboo or wooden watchtower.
7. Asiento de la Sabiduría/Luklukan ng Karunungan (Seat of Wisdom) – She represents the title Sedes Sapientiæ, and carries the Holy Bible.
8. Arco de la Pacto/Kaban ng Tipan (Ark of the Covenant) - She represents the title Fœderis arca and carries a replica of the said object. As the mercy seat of the Ark was the throne of God on Earth, the Virgin bore God the Son made flesh in her pure womb.
9. Clavé del Cielo/Susì ng Langit (Key of Heaven) – She bears two keys, one gold and the other silver, adapted from the Papal arms. She doubles as representing the title Ianua Cœli (Puerta del Cielo/Pintô sa Langit, "Gate of Heaven”).
10. Reina de las Estrellas (Queen of the Stars) – She holds a wand or staff topped with a star, representing the title Stella Matutina (“Morning Star”). It may have a secondary allusion to Stella Maris (“Star of the Sea”), a Marian title associated with seafarers but not in the Litany.
11. Rosa Mística (Mystical Rose) – She bears a bouquet or garland of roses, a single rose, or preferably, the Barra Alta (a processional staff of office).
12. Corazón de María/Pusò ni María (Heart of Mary) – She signifies the Immaculate Heart of Mary, and bears some image of this.
13. Reina del Santísimo Rosario (Queen of the Most Holy Rosary) – She represents the title Regina Sacratissimi Rosarii and so carries a large set of rosary beads. The Philippines bears the poetic sobriquet Pueblo Amante de María (“People Who Love Mary”), due to the many fervent and varied devotions to the Mother of God.
14. Reina Luna (Queen Moon) – She represents the moon, the footstool of Mary as the Woman of the Apocalypse. She carries a wand or staff topped with a crescent moon.
15. Reina Candelaria (Queen of Candles) – She carries a long, lit taper, symbolising the Purification of Mary, or sometimes a Menorah from the Temple where this occurred. Use of the seven-branched candlestick can bear the meanings of the Seven Sacraments, Seven Virtues, or Seven Gifts of the Holy Spirit.
16. Reina de la Paz (Queen of Peace) – She carries a dove, real or otherwise, symbolising World Peace or God the Holy Spirit.
17. Reina de las Patriarcas (Queen of Patriarchs) – She represents the title Regina Patriarcharum, and bears a wooden staff of authority in imitation of the Patriarchs, the male ancestors of Israelites.
18. Reina de las Profetas (Queen of Prophets) – She represents the title Regina Prophetarum, and holds an hourglass or clock symbolic of Time: past, present, and future. It also alludes to Mary's role in bearing Christ as fulfilling Old Testament prophecy, especially Isaiah 7:14 on Immanuel, and God's words to Eve and the Serpent in Genesis 3:15.
19. Reina de los Confesores (Queen of Confessors) – She represents the title Regina Confessorum, and holds an open or closed scroll, or a purple candle. This symbolises Confessors – both saints who did not die as martyrs, as well as priests who hear and absolve in the Sacrament of Penance (the liturgical colour of which is purple).
20. Reina de los Mártires (Queen of Martyrs) – She represents the title Regina Martyrum, and bears the Crown of Thorns or a pierced heart, as a second manifestation of the Mater Dolorosa. She stands for the Martyrs, whom the Church defines as those killed In odium fidei (“In hatred of the Faith”).
21. Reina de los Apóstoles (Queen of Apostles) – She represents the title Regina Apostolorum, and holds the Palm of Martyrdom, an Ancient Roman symbol of victory which later denoted those who died heroically rather than renounce Christ. Mary, understood to be Jesus’ first disciple, is also honoured by His other chief disciples, the Apostles, and was with them during the moments of the foundation of Christianity.
22. Reina de los Santos (Queen of Saints) – She represents the title Regina Omnium Sanctorum, and bears a golden wreath symbolising the Crown of the Saints. She is often escorted by two more ladies in white, standing in for All Saints.
23. Reina del Cielo (Queen of Heaven) – She holds a flower, and is often accompanied by two ladies dressed in white.
24. Reina de las Vírgenes (Queen of Virgins) – She carries a rosary or lily, the latter signifying chastity. She is also escorted by two ladies dressed in white, symbolising Virgins in general, whether martyred and consecrated.

===== Prominent titles =====
1. Reina de las Flores (Queen of Flowers) – She is considered Queen of the religious pageant. She processes under an arch festooned with flowers, and carries a large bouquet.

2. Reina Elena (Queen Helena) – She represents Saint Helena herself, and holds a cross or crucifix to symbolise the True Cross of Jesus. This considerably prestigious role is often awarded to the most beautiful girl or most important matron of the pageant. Some communities do not reveal the identity of the year’s Reina Elena until the Santacruzan itself. Other places allow more than one woman this normally singular honour.

- Constantino – the traditional escort of the Reina Elena, he represents the historical figure’s son, Constantine the Great (272–337 AD). Despite the Emperor having been middle-aged man when his mother found the True Cross, this role is almost always played by a boy or adolescent male, and very rarely an adult. He is often dressed formally or as a king, wearing a crown or coronet and bearing a sword.

3. Reina Emperatríz (Queen Empress) – Always the last member of the procession, she is symbolic of Saint Helena's title Augusta ('empress' or 'queen mother'), which she received from Constantine in 325 AD. A theory for duplicate representations of the holy Empress is that several women wanted the role, so this secondary manifestation was created to accommodate them.

The procession is accompanied by a local brass band, playing the Dios te salve (a Spanish setting of the Hail Mary). Devotees bear lit candles and sing the hymn as they walk. In more modern arrangements, a speaker truck is used to broadcast this and other hymns. It is customary for participating males not in costume to dress in traditional barong tagalog or Western-style formal wear, while females wear any Filipiniana-inspired or designer outfits.

== See also ==
- May Day
