= Our Lady of Biglang Awa of Pulilan =

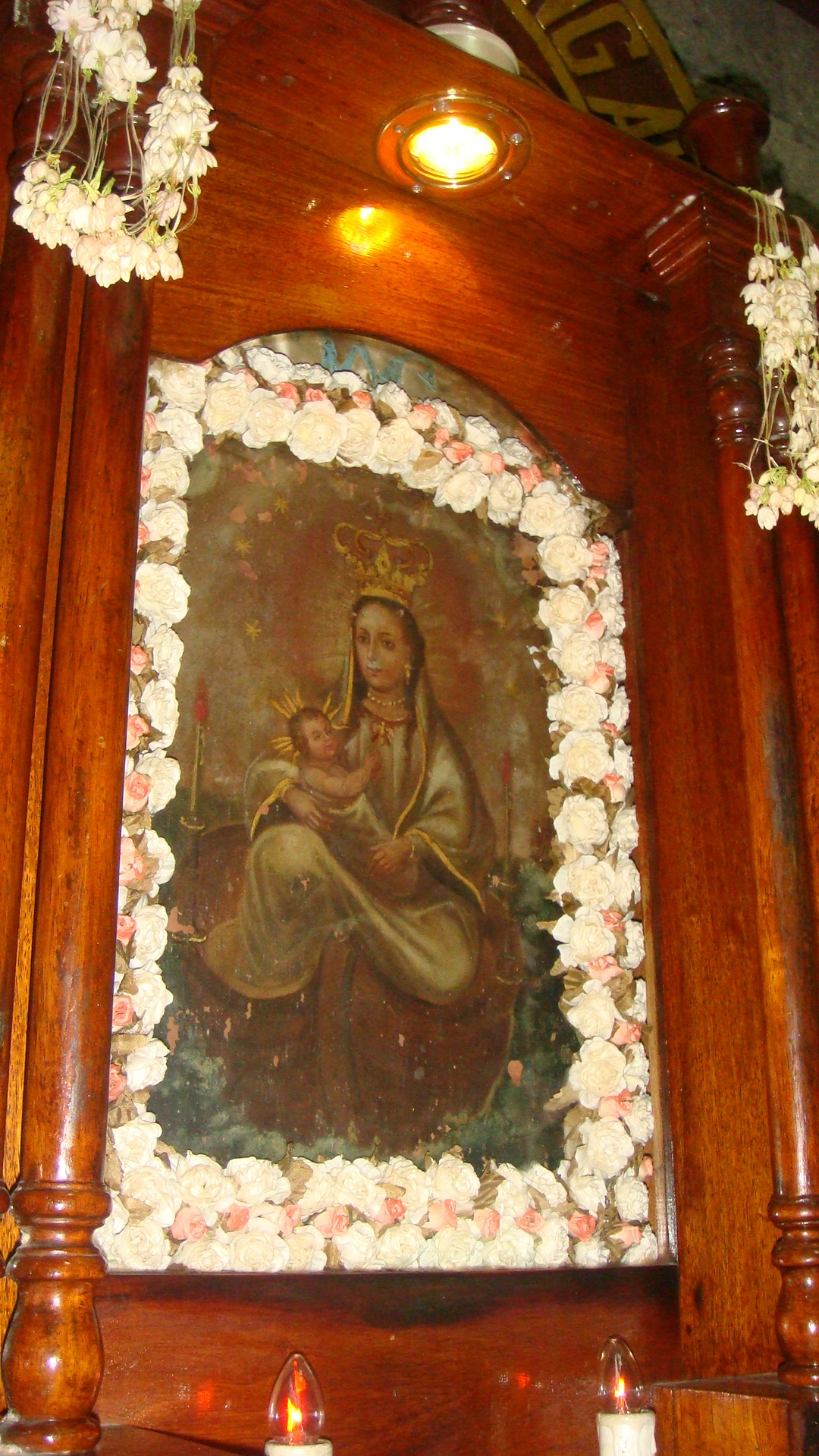
- The icon itself, which is said to have saved its owners and riders in the same boat from drowning centuries ago.
- Venerated in: Catholic Church
- Major shrine: Pulilan, Bulacan, Philippines
- Feast: First Sunday in Lent
- Attributes: Crown, boat, lit tapers
- Patronage: Pulilan

Our Lady of Biglang Awa of Pulilan (Tagalog, "Prompt Mercy/Succor", not to be confused with Our Lady of Perpetual Succor or Our Lady of Prompt Succor) is a Catholic icon enshrined in the town of Pulilan, Bulacan in the Philippines. An object of devotion in the province and Central Luzon, it is in private hands and dates to at least the 18th century.

== Description and history ==
The icon is a small, painted panel of the Blessed Virgin Mary in robes of blue with gold hems, cradling the Christ Child. The Virgin wears jewellery and a royal eight-arched Crown (inspired by Spanish regalia), her head surrounded by a halo of twelve stars.

She is seated in a wooden boat sailing towards the viewer, and she is flanked by two gold candlesticks bearing lit tapers. The boat sails on stormy waters under a grey, cloudy sky. The icon itself has suffered wear and damage over the centuries. Partially obscured by the flowers in its frame is the interlaced "A" and "M" of the Auspice Maria symbol, painted in blue above the Virgin's head. It bears some stylistic similarities to the icon of Our Lady of Prompt Succor of Binondo.

Legend tells that the icon was found by an itinerant Chinese merchant named Tan Ho-Co, the progenitor of the Tanjutco Family. During a flood, the icon suddenly manifested in the waters and fixed itself to the hull of the outrigger boat, preventing it from sinking and saving the passengers.

The icon is enshrined in a wooden frame surrounded by flowers and carved columns, placed above the altar of its small, private oratory along San Francisco Street, Biglang Awa Village, part of the town's Barangay Población. The icon and oratory are managed by the Estrada-Joson Family who are its present camamareros (caretakers, servants), having inherited the icon from the Tanjutcos.

Its local feast day is the First Sunday of Lent, known as "Quadragesima Sunday" or "Invocabit Sunday", from the incipit of the introit for that day's Mass in the Extraordinary Form.

== Gallery ==
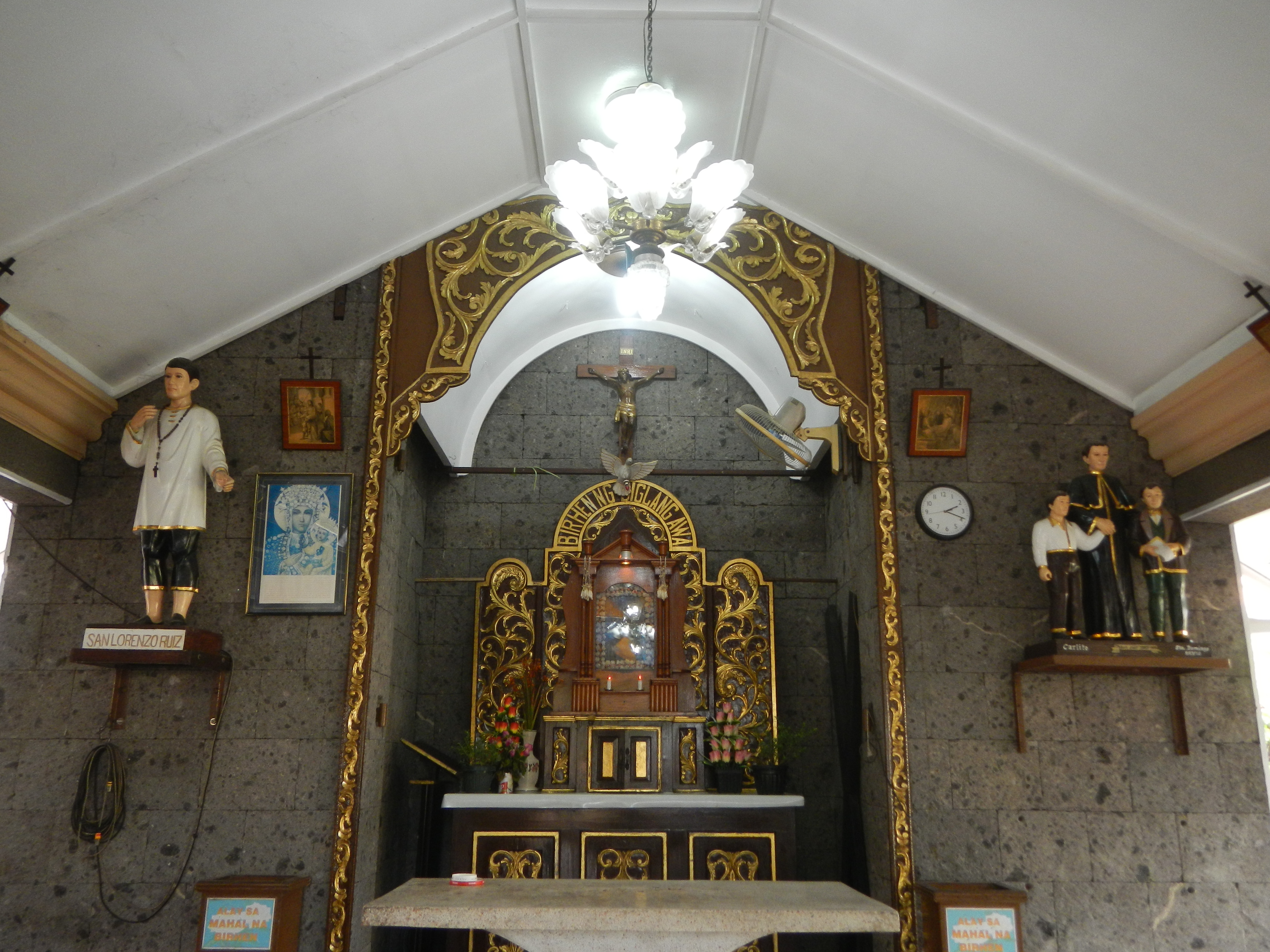
The oratory and altar, which also enshrines Our Lady of Częstochowa, Lorenzo Ruiz, John Bosco, and Dominic Savio.

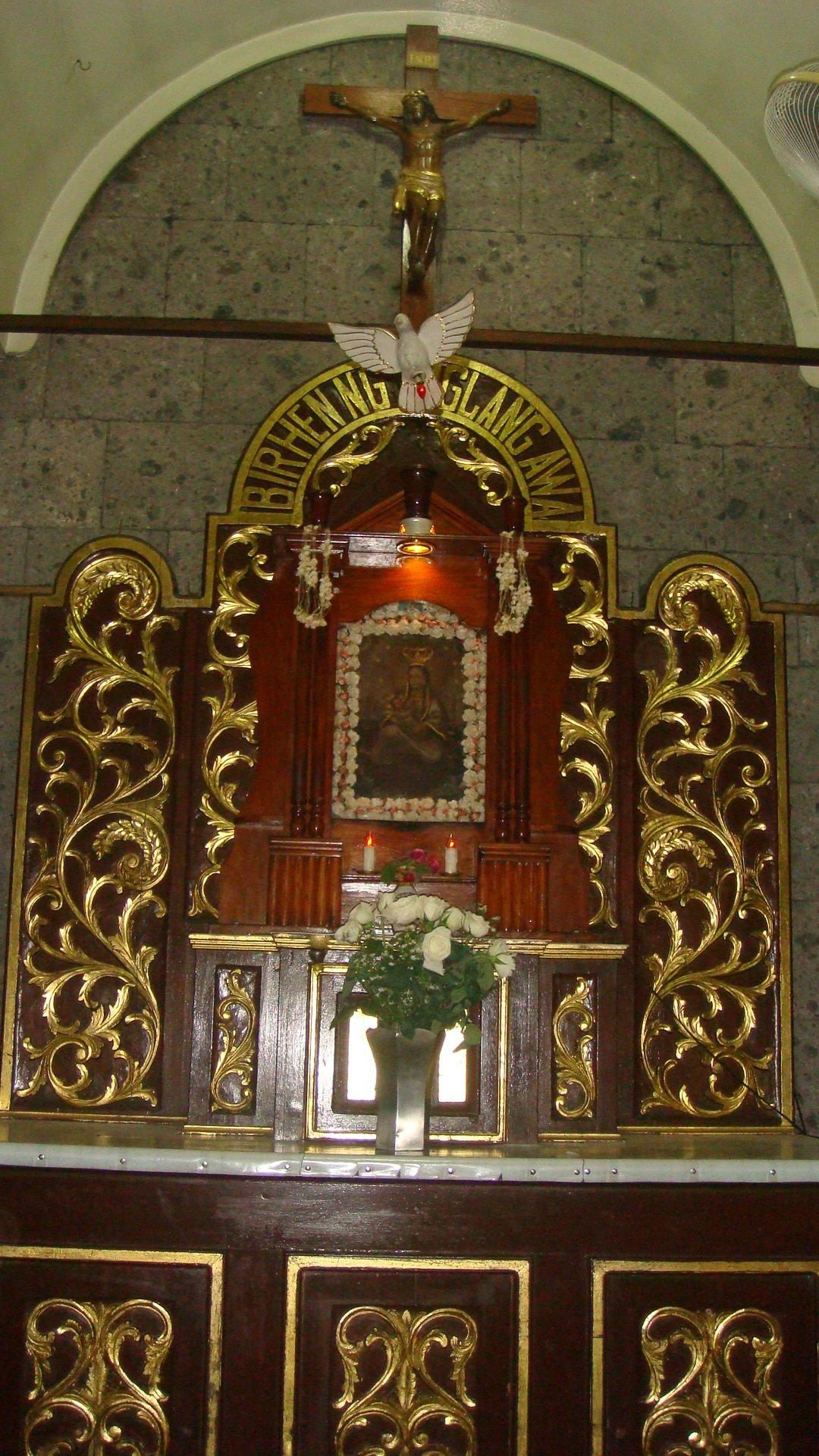
The icon in situ, with a red votive light under a carving of the Holy Ghost.

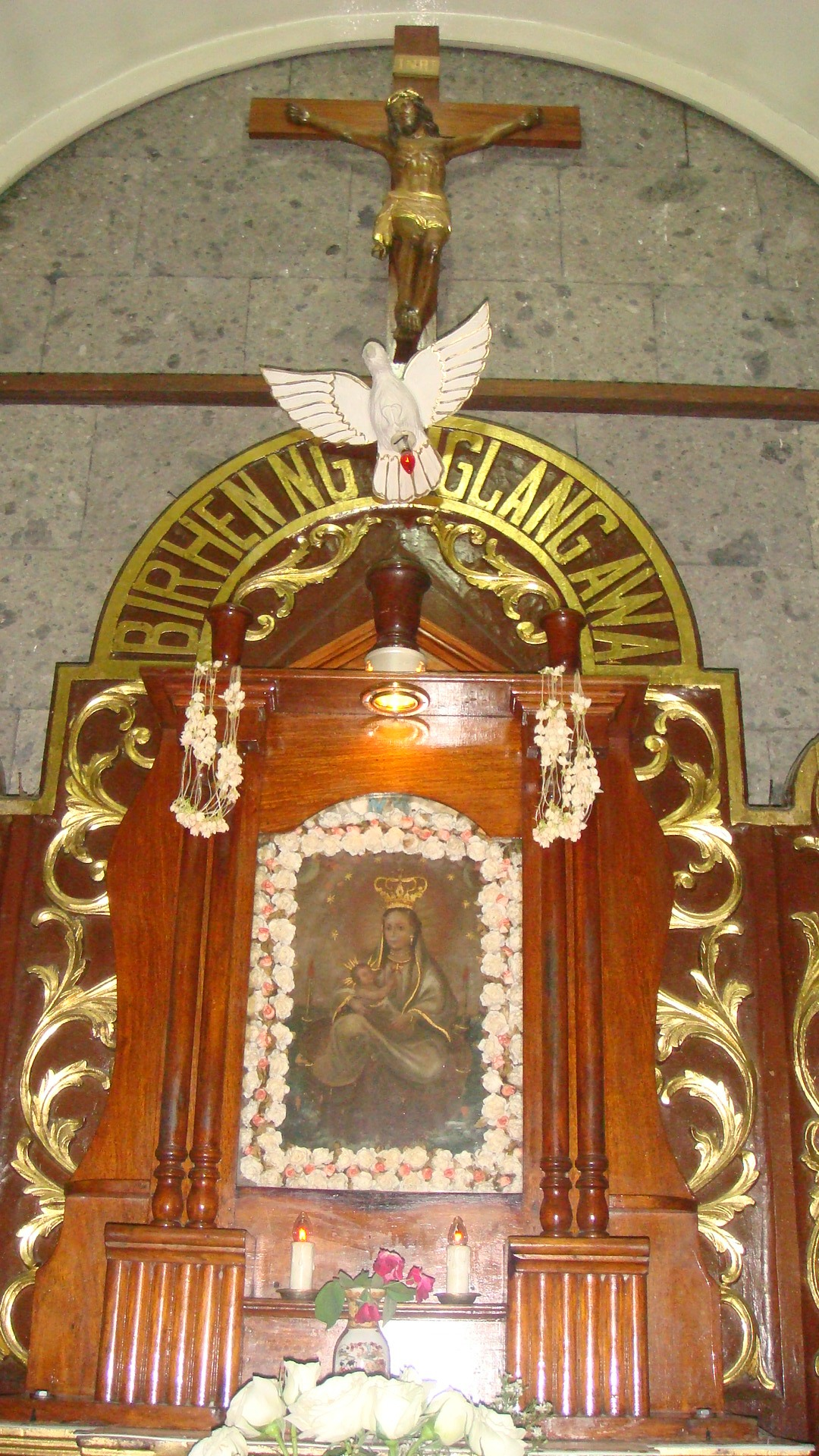
Closeup of the icon in its altar, showing its title and carved frame.

== Transport ==
Pulilan lies some 50 kilometres northeast of Manila, on Luzon Island. From Manila, the main motorway is the NLEx, with the town accessible via the Pulilan or Santa Rita exits. Other roads include the Maharlika Highway (from Guiguinto, Plaridel, or Baliwag).

The MacArthur Highway is another popular access point from the Bulaqueño provincial capital of Malolos, the Calumpit Crossing, Balagtas, or Guiguinto, as well as the Pampanga towns of Apalit, San Simón, Minalin, and the provincial capital of San Fernando. From there, one would turn near the Caltex station before the bridge to the Calumpit town proper and public market.
