= Roodmas =

Celebration of the Feast of the Cross

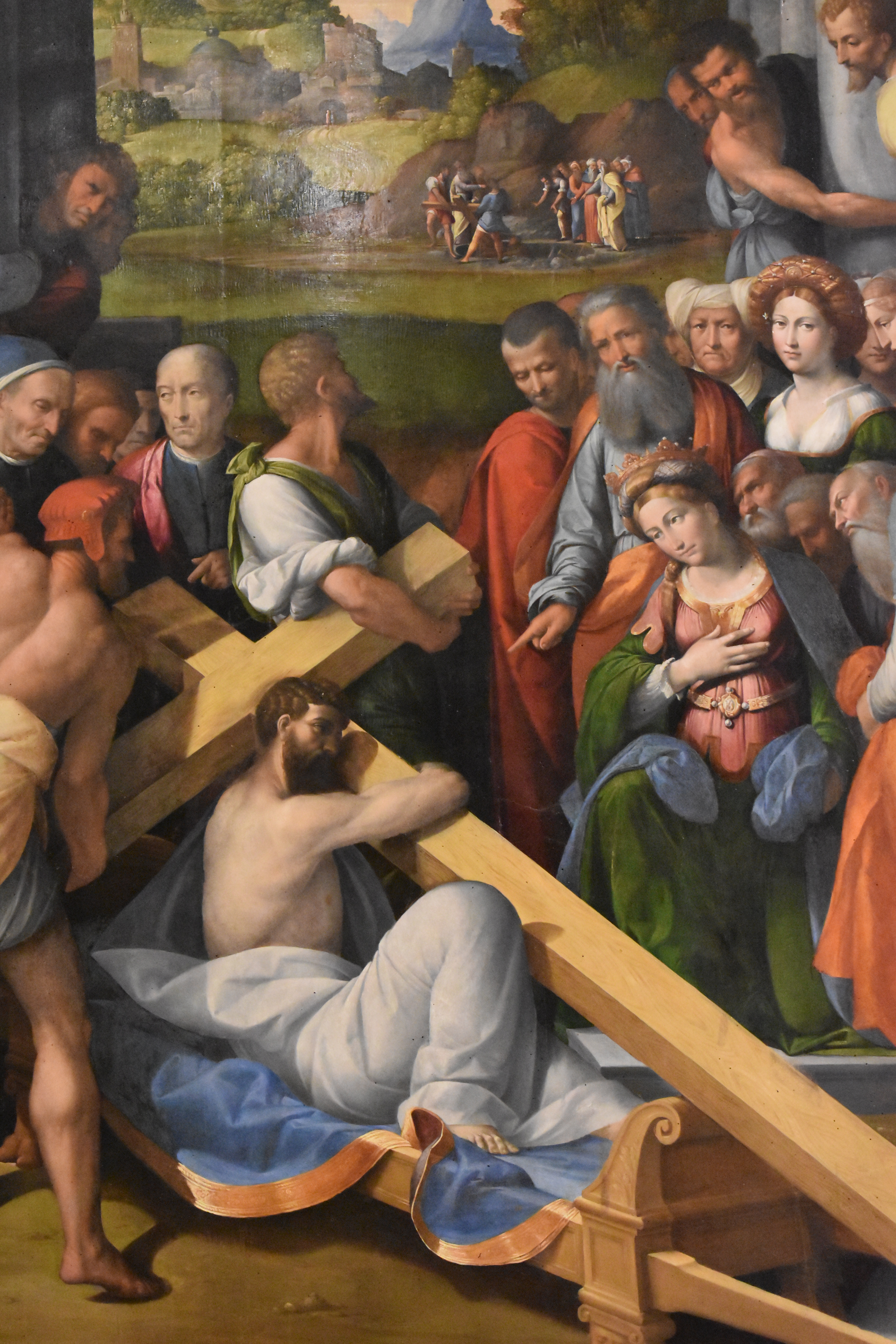
Helena finding the cross

Roodmas (from Old English rood "rod", "cross" and mas, Mass; similar to the etymology of Christmas) is a name for the celebration of the Feast of the Cross. It has been applied to both historical commemoration on May 3 and September 14. It commemorates the finding by Saint Helena of the True Cross in Jerusalem in 326.

== History ==
The feast originally commemorated the dedication of the Martyrium, and was linked with the finding of the Cross shortly thereafter. Saint Helena reportedly found the Cross on September 14, 326. Many legends developed, and the story of the “invention,” or the finding of the cross, enhanced by romances, became a favourite throughout Christendom. The feast entered the Western calendar in the seventh century after Emperor Heraclius recovered the cross from the Persians.

=== "Invention" (Finding) of the True Cross ===
Beginning about the seventh century, the Gallican Church, celebrated the Feast of the Cross on May 3. The Feast of the "Invention of the True Cross" commemorates the recovery by the Byzantine Emperor Heraclius, of a portion of the Holy Cross on 3 May 629, after it fell into the hands of the Persians.

According to Herbert Thurston:

[T]he portion of the Holy Cross preserved in Jerusalem afterwards fell into the hands of the Persians, but was recovered and,...was solemnly brought back to Jerusalem on 3 May, 629. This day seems to have attracted special attention among Celtic liturgists in the West and, though disregarded in the East, has passed through Celtic channels (we meet it first in the Lectionary of Silos and in the Bobbio Missal) into general recognition under the mistaken title of "Invention of the Cross.

The commemoration of the "Invention of the True Cross', particularly popular in the historical Gallican Rite of the Catholic Church. was kept by the Western Church on 3 May.

== Later developments ==
After the Gallican and Latin liturgical rites were combined, the days were observed individually as the Finding of the Holy Cross (May 3) and the Triumph of the Cross (September 14). Some Protestant churches followed this practice; the Church of England's Book of Common Prayer places Roodmas on May 3. In Devonshire, Roodmas was observed on the first Monday after May 3 with a procession of the bounds of the parish.

In 1960, Pope John XXIII combined both Latin Church's celebrations into the September 14 feast, in line with his revisions to the General Roman Calendar that, among other things, eliminated duplicate feasts. The Church of England followed suit with the adoption of the Common Worship liturgy in 2000.

In the Philippines, the Santacruzan—a ritual pageant commemorating the Finding of the True Cross—is still held in May as the custom originated in the pre-1955 Filipino Catholic observance of Roodmas. Many churches dedicated to and communities devoted to the Holy Cross or a crucifix (called a Santo Cristo) have retained May 3 as the date of their patronal feast.

== Folklore ==
In Scotland, Roodmas (or Féill Ròid) marks the start of the rutting season of the deer. It was held that if the night before it was wet, it would be followed by a month of dry weather, "and the farmer need be under no apprehension of securing his crops." John Gregorson Campbell described the belling of the red deer among the hills on this night as "magnificent". Market fairs were held in Scotland.
