= Our Lady of Prompt Succor of Binondo =

Oil painting

Our Lady of Prompt Succor Nuestra Señora de Biglang Awa Virgen del Pronto Socorro de Binondo Nuestra Señora del Pronto Socorro
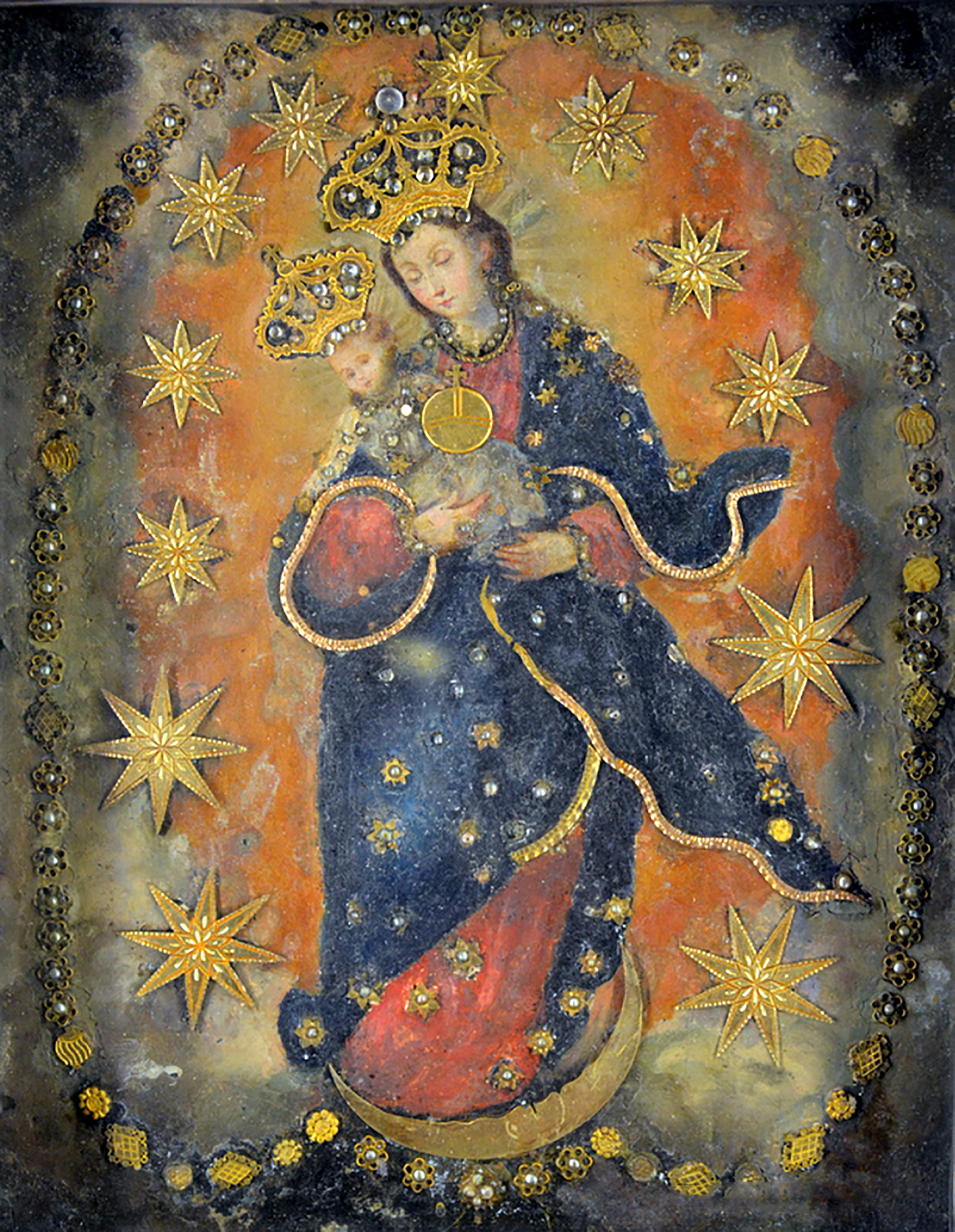
- Original Bejeweled Painting of Our Lady of Prompt Succor of Binondo
- Venerated in: Roman Catholic Church; Philippine Independent Church
- Major shrine: Binondo Church, Manila; Philippines
- Feast: Last Sunday of May

Our Lady of Prompt Succor, also known as Nuestra Señora de Biglang Awa, Nuestra Señora del Pronto Socorro, Nuestra Señora del Pronto Socorro de Binondo or Virgen del Pronto Socorro de Binondo is a framed oil painting placed over a sheet of metal. It shows the Virgin Mary with the infant Jesus seated on her right arm. She is dressed in a red tunic with a blue mantle. The face of Mary is pious and that of the holy infant winning and expressive as He looks towards His Mother. It is the second oldest marian painting in the philippines, below the image of our lady of Porta Vaga

== Description ==
The frame measures approximately 20 Centimeters in height and 15 and one half in with. Adorning the mantle and tunic of celestial virgin are small pearls and tiny gold stars. At her feet is a half-moon made of the same sheet of silver metal. Around the image is an oval arch of 12 golden stars. Two large ones at the lower part and four smaller pairs towards the top. The Holy Infant holds a golden globe crowned with a cross of the same precious metal. Both Mother and Child wear crowns of gold which are superimposed on the painting: for the half-moon at her feet, a chain of gold and pearls goes all around the border of the image described.

== History ==
The image of Our Lady of Pronto Socorro was venerated during the year 1704 in the church of the Holy Kings of Parian in Manila, which was under the Dominican Fathers, making it the second of the oldest venerated Marian image in the Philippines. The church was situated on the site that used to between the hanging bridge (Fuente Colgante) and the military hospital, later in 1598, the image was transferred to the church of St. Gabriel in Binondo, in the locality occupied by the business establishment. Finally after an earthquake of June 1863, the image was brought to the parish of Binondo where she is presently venerated and honored every second Saturday of the month. It was devotionally believed to be painted in the year 1796 defined by some painting experts.

== Devotion ==
When the image was housed in the Church of St. Gabriel, devotees visited it to seek Virgin Mary's help and protection in times of need. According to tradition, prayers offered before the image were answered promptly, giving rise to the title Our Lady of Pronto Socorro ("Our Lady of Prompt Succor").

== Gallery ==
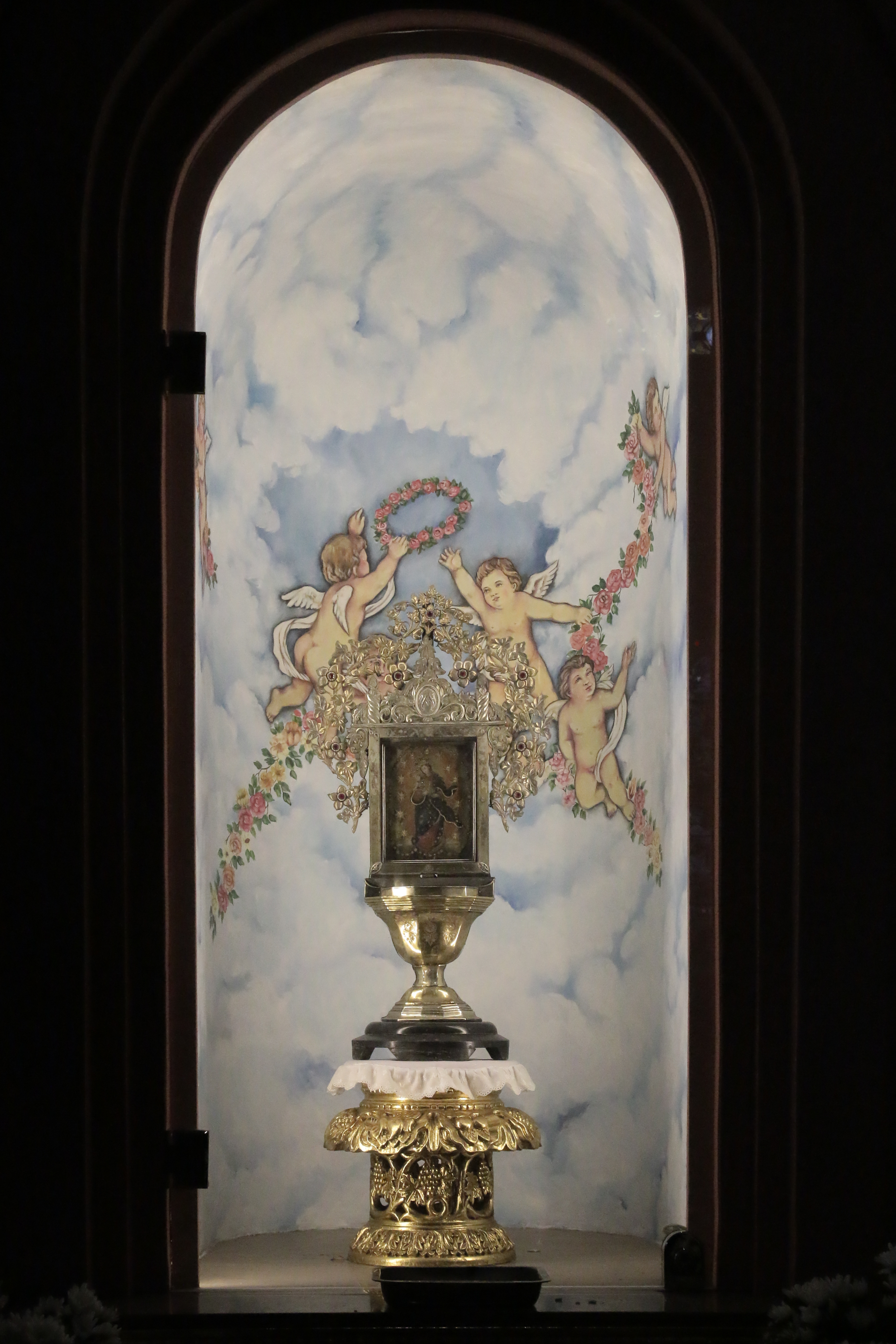
The image in its niche at the Church of Binondo

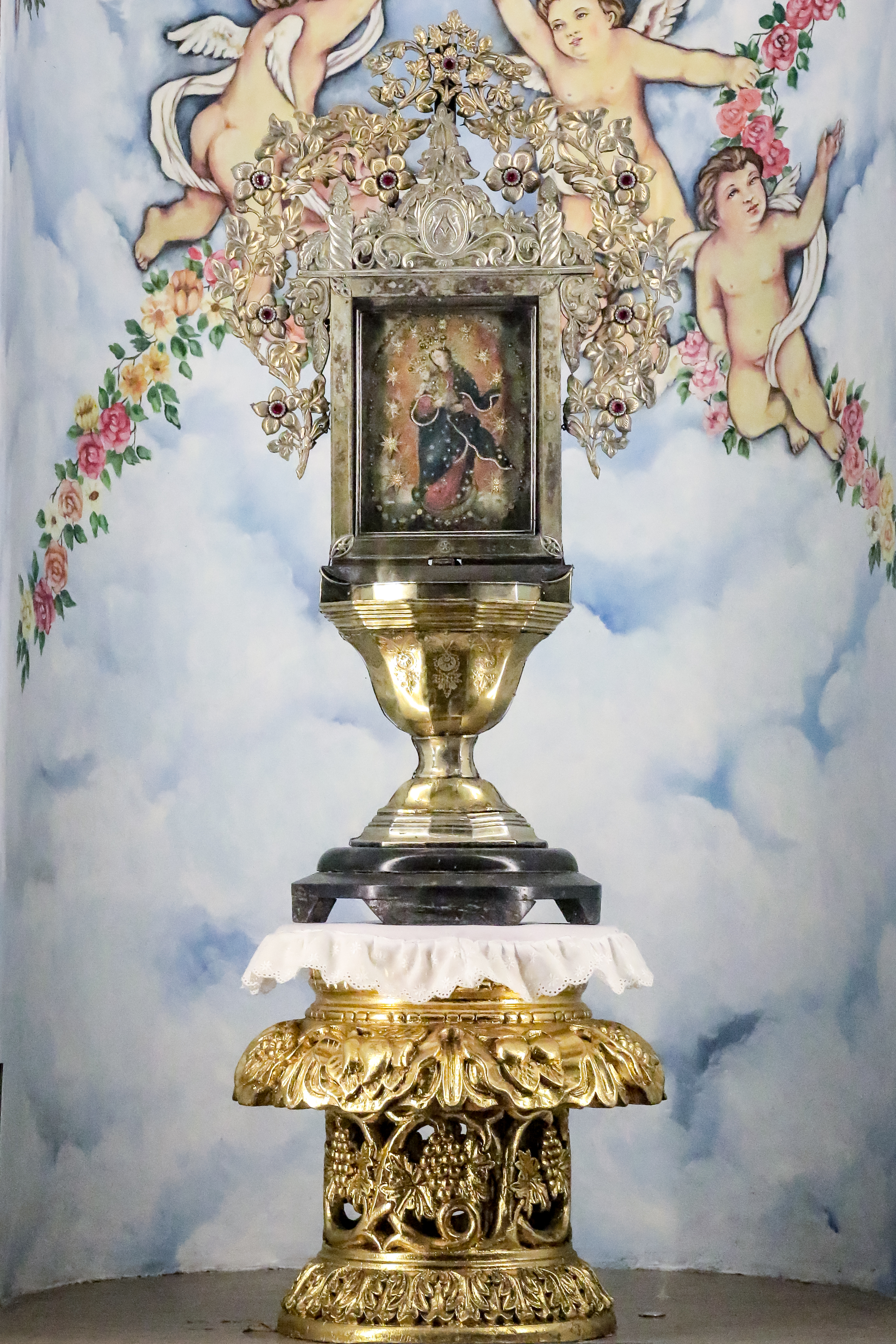
Overall detail from base to the frame

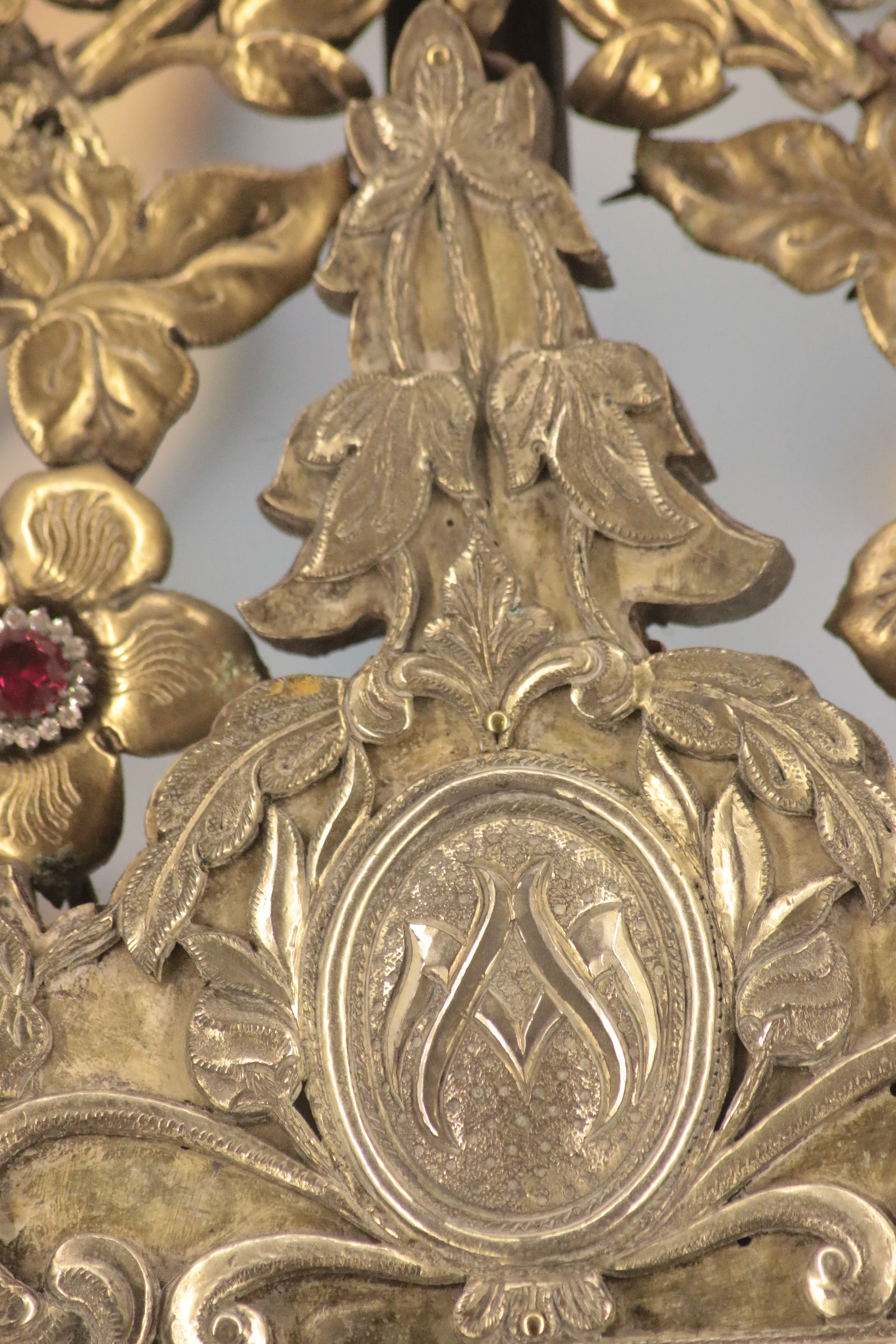
Detail of the "Auspice Maria" on the crown of the frame

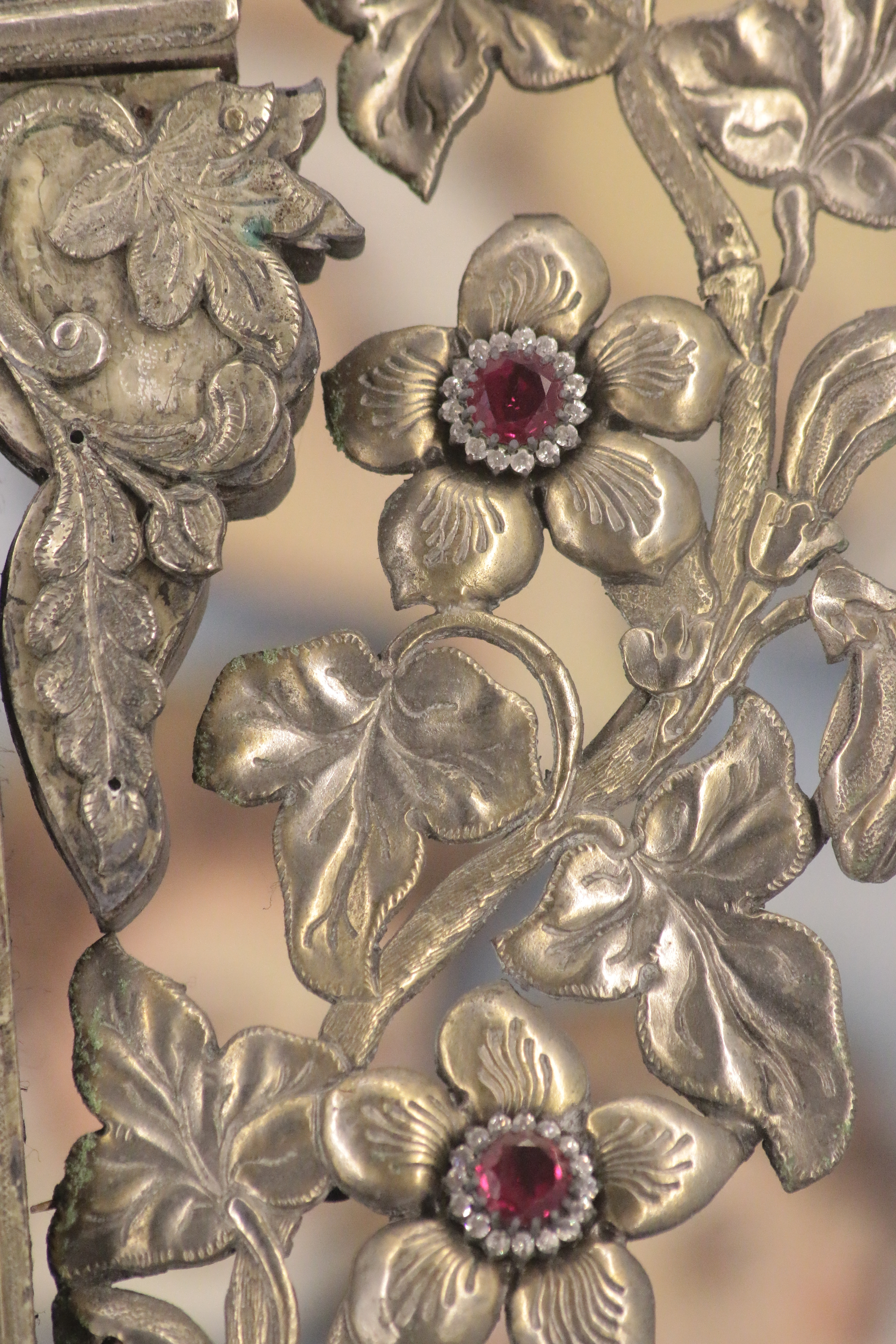
Detail of the floral motif design surrounding the frame

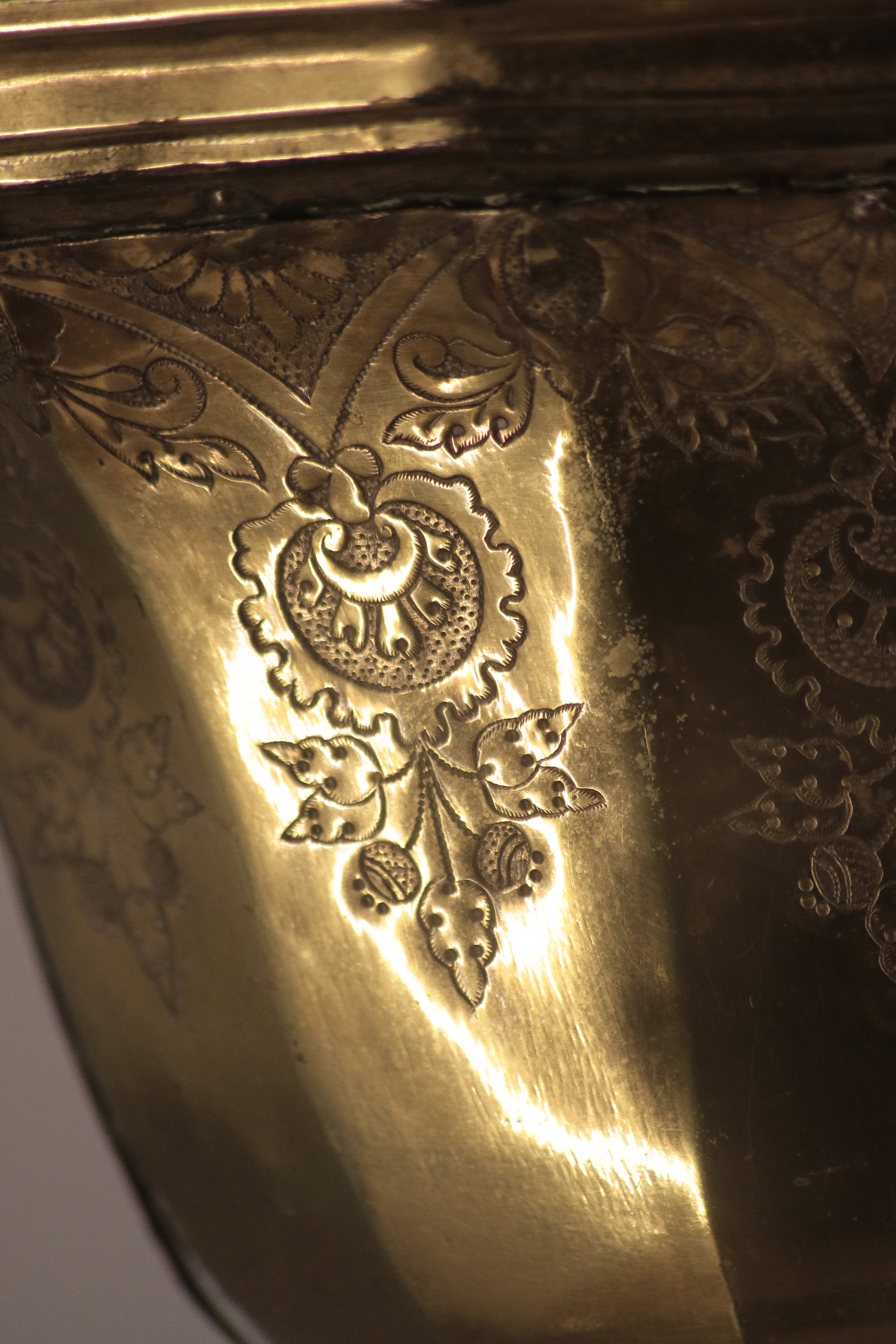
Detail of the engraving at the "Peña"/ base of the frame

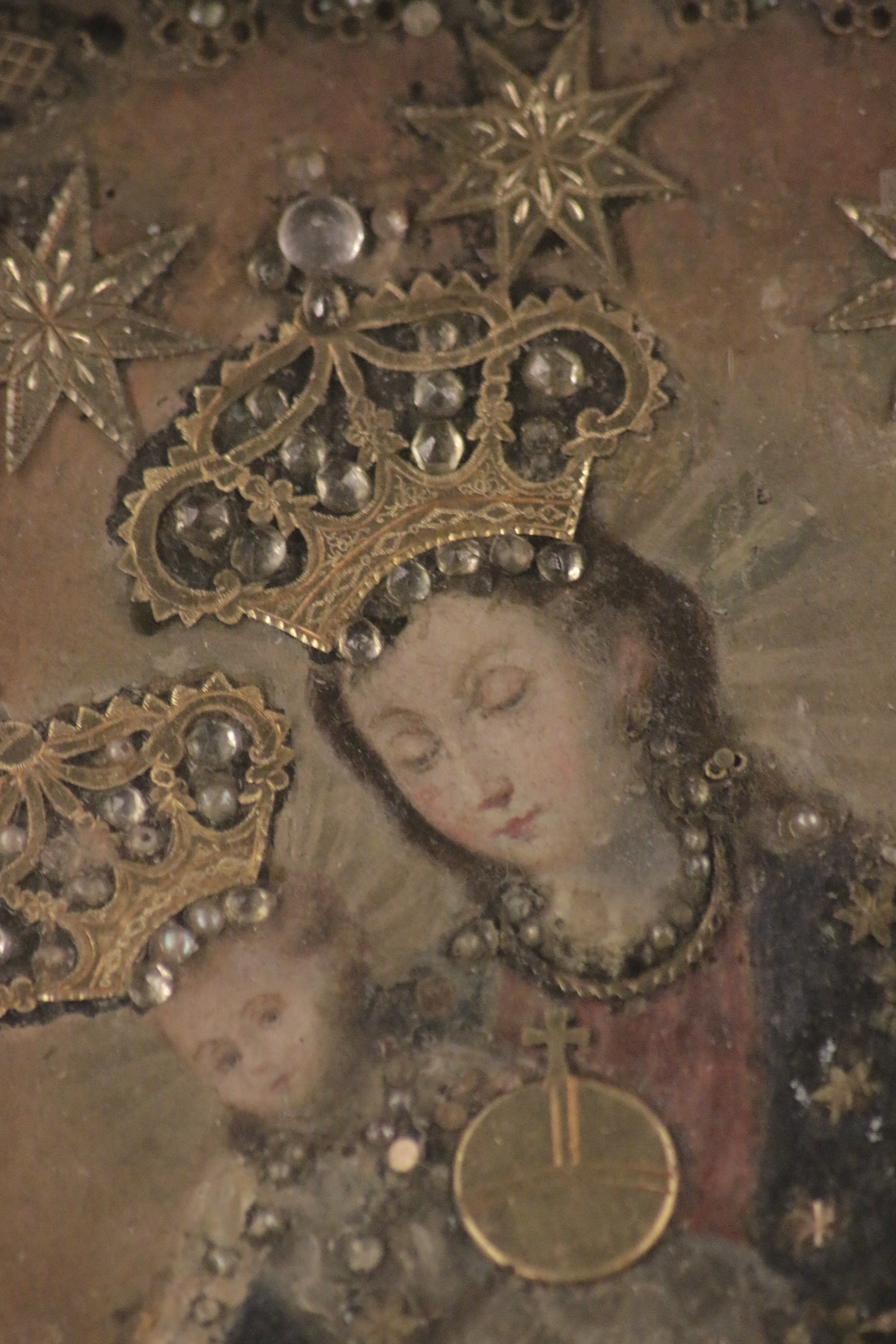
Detail of the painting

== See also ==
- Miraculous Bigláng Awà
- Our Lady of Prompt Succor
