= Feast of the Cross =

Christian celebration of the crucifix

Feast of the Exaltation of the Holy Cross
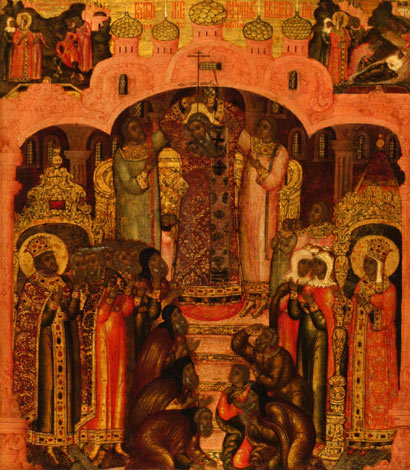
- Russian icon of the Feast of the Exaltation of the Cross (icon from Yaroslavl by Gury Nikitin, 1680. Tretyakov Gallery, Moscow).
- Official name: Feast of the Exaltation of the Holy Cross
- Also called: Holy Cross Day
- Liturgical color: Red
- Date: 13 September (Church of the East); 14 September (Gregorian calendar); 27 September (14 September in Julian calendar)
- Frequency: Annual
- Related to: Roodmas, Good Friday

The Feast of the Holy Cross, Feast of the Exaltation of the Holy Cross, or Feast of the Cross commemorates the True Cross. On 13 September 335, the Constantinian Basilica over the Holy Sepulchre was consecrated in Jerusalem. The day after the church's consecration, the relic of the cross was shown ("exalted") for the first time to the people for veneration. Later, the feast was also associated with the commemoration of the recovery of the Holy Cross by the Byzantine emperor Heraclius on 13 September 628.

In the liturgical year, there are several celebrations which honor and celebrate the cross used in the crucifixion. Unlike Good Friday, which is dedicated to the passion of Christ and the crucifixion, these feast days celebrate the Cross itself, as the sign of salvation. It is celebrated by Catholics (Latin Church Catholics, Eastern Catholics), Eastern Orthodox, Oriental Orthodox, Church of the East, Old Catholics, Lutherans and Anglicans, and to a lesser extent by Presbyterians, Methodists and Baptists. The most common day of commemoration is September 14 for churches that use the Gregorian calendar and September 27 for churches that use the Julian calendar, Ge'ez calendar, or Coptic calendar.

In English, the feast is called the Feast of the Exaltation of the Holy Cross in the translation of the Roman Missal of 2010, while the 1973 translation called it Feast of the Triumph of the Cross. In some parts of the Anglican Communion the feast is called Holy Cross Day, a name also used by Lutherans. The celebration is also sometimes called Holy Rood Day, or by the historical names Roodmas or Crouchmas.

== History ==
The Feast of the Exaltation of the Holy Cross, celebrated every year on 14 September, recalls three events:

1. The finding of the True Cross by Saint Helena.
2. The dedication of churches built by Emperor Constantine on the site of the Holy Sepulchre and Mount Calvary.
3. The elevation of the True Cross at Hagia Sophia in Constantinople in AD 629 by the Byzantine emperor Heraclius, after it had fallen into the hands of the Persian Emperor Chosroes II in the AD 614 Sasanian conquest of Jerusalem.

Under Emperor Constantine, around AD 327, Bishop Macarius of Jerusalem caused excavations to be made in order to ascertain the location of Calvary as well as that of the Holy Sepulchre. It was in the course of these excavations that the wood of the cross was recovered. It was determined by Macarius to be authentic (the crosses of the two thieves were also recovered) and for it Constantine built the Basilica of the Holy Sepulchre. Subsequently, pieces of the True Cross relic were distributed across the empire and by the turn of the 5th century were venerated as far away as Italy.

The Ancient Georgian Iadgari (Chantbook) bears witness to the celebration of the Exaltation of the Cross in Jerusalem before the middle of the 6th century. In the west before the end of the seventh century the feast was mainly observed in Rome. However, the earliest recorded commemoration of 14 September as the feast day on a Western calendar is from the 7th century AD.

In the Gallican usage, beginning about the seventh century, the Feast of the Cross was celebrated on 3 May, and called "Crouchmas" (for "Cross Mass" or "Mass Of The Cross") or "Roodmas". When the Gallican and Roman practices were combined, the September date was assigned to commemorating the rescue of the cross from the Sassanid Persians, and the May date was kept as the Finding of the Holy Cross or Invention of the True Cross to commemorate the finding. ("Invention" is a rendering of the Latin term inventio meaning "discovery".) Pope John XXIII removed this feast in 1960, so that the General Roman Calendar now celebrates both the finding and the exaltation of the Holy Cross on 14 September, although various places in Latin America, Mexico, and the Philippines still celebrate the feast of the finding on 3 May. Communities which celebrate the Extraordinary Form of the Roman Rite also observe the feast of the finding of the Holy Cross on 3 May.

=== Theological distinction ===
The Second Council of Nicæa of 787, drew the distinction between veneration of the cross and worship or latria, "which, according to the teaching of the faith, belongs to the Divine nature alone." Petavius noted that this cult must be considered as not belonging to the substance of religion, but as being one of the things not absolutely necessary to salvation. Thus, the honor paid to the image passes to the prototype; and he who adores the image, adores the person whom it represents.

== Traditions ==
According to Christian tradition, the True Cross was discovered in 326 by Saint Helena, the mother of the Roman Emperor Constantine the Great, during a pilgrimage she made to Jerusalem. The Church of the Holy Sepulchre was then built at the site of the discovery, by order of Helena and Constantine. The church was dedicated nine years later, with a portion of the cross. One-third remained in Jerusalem, one-third was brought to Rome and deposited in the Sessorian basilica Santa Croce in Gerusalemme (Holy Cross in Jerusalem), and one-third was taken to Constantinople to make the city impregnable.

The date of the feast marks the dedication of the Church of the Holy Sepulchre in 335. This was a two-day festival: although the actual consecration of the church was on 13 September, the cross itself was brought outside the church on 14 September so that the clergy and faithful could pray before the True Cross, and all could come forward to venerate it.

Historically in Western Christianity, the Wednesday, Friday, and Saturday of the calendar week after the one in which the feast day occurs are designated as one of each year's four sets of Ember days. Until 1969, these ember days were a part of the liturgical calendar of the Roman Catholic Church. Organization of these celebrations in the ordinary form is now left to the decision of episcopal conferences in view of local conditions and customs. The ember days are still observed in the calendar of the Roman Rite's Extraordinary Form, the Anglican Ordinariate, and Western Orthodoxy.

=== Liturgical colours ===
Red is the usual liturgical color in churches that follow such traditions.

In Western Christianity, red vestments are worn at church services conducted on this day.

The lectionaries of the Church of England (and other Anglican churches) and Western Rite Orthodoxy also stipulate red as the liturgical color for 'Holy Cross Day'.

In Eastern Orthodox Churches that use various liturgical colors, red vestments are also worn. Yet in these Orthodox churches, the wearing of red continues for a week after the feast.

=== Religious orders ===
The Carmelite Rule of St. Albert of 1247 gives this date as the beginning of the period of fasting, which ends on Easter Sunday.

This date is the titular feast of the Congregation of Holy Cross, The Companions of the Cross and the Episcopal Church's Order of the Holy Cross.

== Observation in various Churches ==
=== Church of England ===
The Common Worship calendar (2000), like the General Roman Calendar, celebrates the Feast on 14 September.

=== Church of the East ===
The Church of the East celebrates the finding of the Cross on 13 September, and considers it to be a major feast. The Assyrian Church considers the Sign of the Cross to be the sacrament by which all of the other sacraments are sealed and perfected. (The Church's traditional list of sacraments does not include marriage.) Saranaya (Syriac) hold a shara every year in cities like Chicago, Illinois, and Modesto, California, and other parts of the world. The shara in Modesto is held every Sunday prior to 13 September at East La Loma Park, where they sacrifice lambs in remembrance of the Feast Of the Cross. People gather to feast, sing and dance to celebrate the joyous event.

=== Eastern Orthodoxy ===
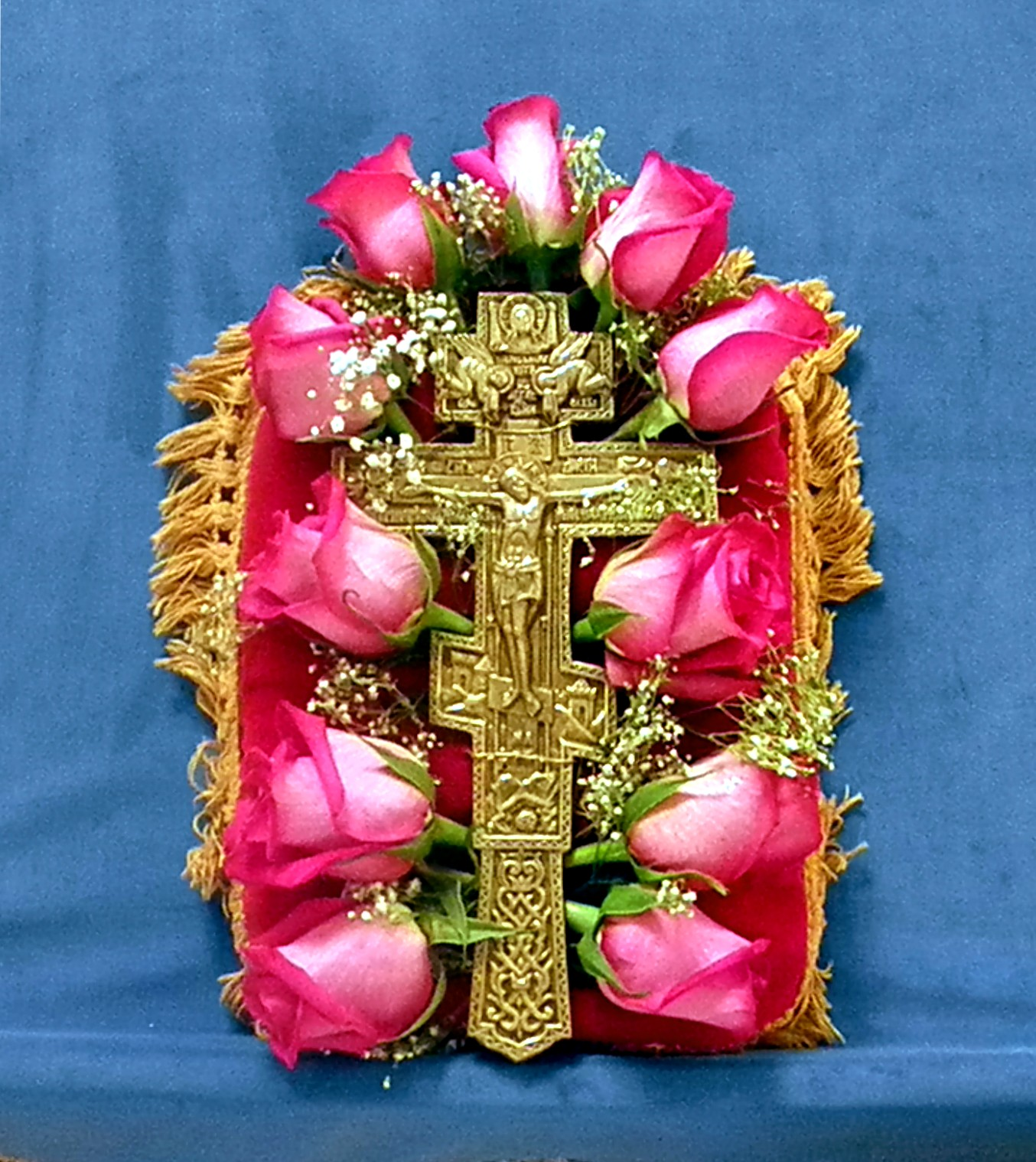
Orthodox Cross set for special veneration on the feast of The Universal Exaltation of the Precious and Life Giving Cross

In Byzantine liturgical observance, the Universal Exaltation (also called Elevation in Eastern Orthodox tradition) of the Precious and Life-creating Cross commemorates both the finding of the True Cross in the year 326 and its recovery from the Persians in the year 628, and is one of the Twelve Great Feasts of the church year. 14 September is always a fast day and the eating of meat, dairy products and fish is prohibited. The Feast of the Exaltation has a one-day forefeast and an eight-day afterfeast. The Saturday and Sunday before (Note: Saturday Before: I Corin. 2:6–9 and Matthew 10:37–11:1; Sunday Before: Galatians 6:11–16 and John 3:13–17) and after 14 September are also commemorated with special Epistle and Gospel readings (Note: I Corin. 1:18–24 and John 19:6–11, 13–20, 25–28, 30–35 (John's Passion account)) about the Cross at the Divine Liturgy.

On the eve of the feast before small vespers the priest, having prepared a tray with the cross placed on a bed of fresh basil leaves or flowers, covered with an aër (liturgical veil), places it on the table of prothesis; after that service, the priest carries the tray on his head preceded by lighted candles and the deacon incensing the cross, processes to the holy table (altar), in the centre whereof he lays the tray, in the place of the Gospel Book, the latter being set upright at the back of the altar. Those portions of the vespers and matins which in sundry local customs take place before the Icon of the Feast (e.g., the chanting of the Polyeleos and the Matins Gospel (Note: i.e., John 12:28–36, after which is sung the hymn "Having beheld the Resurrection of Christ", normally sung on only Sundays and during Paschaltide.)) instead take place in front of the Holy Table. The bringing out of the cross and the exaltation ceremony occur at matins.

The cross remains in the centre of the temple throughout the afterfeast, and the faithful venerate it whenever they enter or leave the church. Finally, on the leave-taking (apodosis) of the feast, the priest and deacon will incense around the cross, there will be a final veneration of the cross, and then they will solemnly bring the cross back into the sanctuary through the Holy Doors. This same pattern of bringing out the cross, veneration, and returning the cross at the end of the celebration is repeated at a number of the lesser times.

=== Oriental Orthodoxy ===
==== Armenian Apostolic Church and other Armenian Christians ====
The Armenian Apostolic Church observes a five-day fast, called the Fast of the Holy Cross, from September 10 through 14 September, in preparation for the Feast of the Holy Church in view of the Holy Cross, which they celebrate on September 15. September 16 is observed as the Feast of the Exaltation of the Holy Cross (Khachverats in Armenian), a feast which continues for several days thereafter. It is counted as one of the five major feasts of the Armenian Church, and the most important of the four feasts of the Holy Cross. According to Armenian tradition, the first one to "exalt" the Cross was the Apostle James of Jerusalem, the "Brother of the Lord". On the Sunday nearest 14 September, the liturgy is marked with an antasdan service (blessing of the fields) during which the processional cross is adorned with basil (a symbol of royalty) and the four corners of the church are blessed as a sign of the sanctification of the world.

On the Sunday nearest September 28 (always two weeks after the Exaltation) the Armenian Apostolic Church and Armenian Catholic Church celebrate the Feast of the Holy Cross of Varak (Varaka Khach) commemorating the third century placement of an authentic relic of the cross in Armenian soil at Varagavank. This is a cross feast unique to the Armenian Church.

On the Sunday closest to October 26, the Armenian Church celebrates the Discovery of the Holy Cross (Kyood Khach), commemorating the finding of the True Cross by Saint Helena (AD 327).

==== Coptic Orthodox Church and other Coptic Christians ====
The Coptic Orthodox Church and the Coptic Catholic Church annually commemorates two events related to the Cross. The first Feast of the Cross commemorates the Consecration of the Church of the Resurrection on 17 Thout according to the Coptic calendar. This corresponds to 14 September on the Julian Calendar (or, in years following a Coptic leap year, one day later) which will correspond to 27 September on the Gregorian Calendar until AD 2099. The second Feast of the Cross commemorates the Appearance of the Holy Cross on 10 Paremhat according to the Coptic calendar. This corresponds to 19 March on the Gregorian Calendar until AD 2099.

==== Orthodox Tewahedo Churches and other Ethiopian-Eritrean Christians ====
The Ethiopian Orthodox Tewahedo Church, the Eritrean Orthodox Tewahedo Church, and to a lesser extent Ethiopian-Eritrean Evangelical Protestants, the Ethiopian Catholic Church, and the Eritrean Catholic Church, commemorate the finding of the true cross on Mäskäräm 17 of the Ethiopian Calendar. This is the same date as observed by the Coptic Orthodox Church. The eve of this day is popularly called Demera (meaning "Bonfire") in Amharic.

The Ethiopian Patriarch lights a large bonfire in Meskel Square, Addis Ababa's greatest open arena, and smaller bonfires are lit by individuals and local parishes throughout the country. Thousands attend the ceremony of religious chantings around the bonfire in Meskel Square, which owes its name to the ceremony, for meskel means "cross" in Ge'ez. According to tradition, the bonfire commemorates how the Empress Helena used the smoke of a bonfire to determine where to search for the true cross in Jerusalem, or how, by a series of bonfires, she signalled to her son Constantine in Constantinople her success in finding it.

==== Malankara Syrian Orthodox Church ====
In the Malankara Syrian Orthodox Church a special offering called panchasarayumanda is made on this day, in particular at the Akaparambu Mor Sabor-Mor Aphroth Church in the Ernakulam District, Kerala.

=== Roman Catholic Church ===
In the liturgy of the Roman Catholic church, the readings in the Holy Mass for the feast of the Exaltation of the Holy Cross draw a comparison between the bronze serpent of Numbers 21, which was raised up on a pole so that all who looked upon it would be cured of the deadly poison of venomous snakes, and John 3:14–15, "And just as Moses lifted up the serpent in the desert, so must the Son of Man be lifted up, so that everyone who believes in him may have eternal life." If the feast falls on a Sunday, its Mass readings (Note: 1st reading--Numbers 21:4b-9; responsory psalm--Psalm 78; 2nd reading--Phillipians 2:6–11; gospel reading--John 3:13–17.) are used instead of those for the occurring Sunday in Ordinary Time.

== Related observances ==
=== 6 March ===
On 6 March, the liturgical calendar of the Eastern Orthodox Church, commemorates the Uncovering of the Precious Cross and the Precious Nails by Empress Saint Helen—that is to say, the anniversary of the actual discovery; the date for the feast on 14 September was determined by the consecration of the Church of the Holy Sepulchre. This is a lesser feast, and does not have any of the liturgical peculiarities of the feast of 14 September.

=== 3 May ===
The General Roman Calendar before 1960 contained the Feast of the Finding of the Holy Cross (Roodmas) on 3 May. It commemorated the finding of the True Cross by Saint Helena, the mother of the emperor Constantine. With the reorganisation of the liturgical calendar by his Motu proprio Rubricarum instructum of Pope John XXIII (1960), the Feast of the Finding of the Cross was celebrated only in some regions. Meanwhile, the finding of the True cross is also commemorated at the Feast of the Exaltation of the Cross on 14 September.

=== 1 August ===
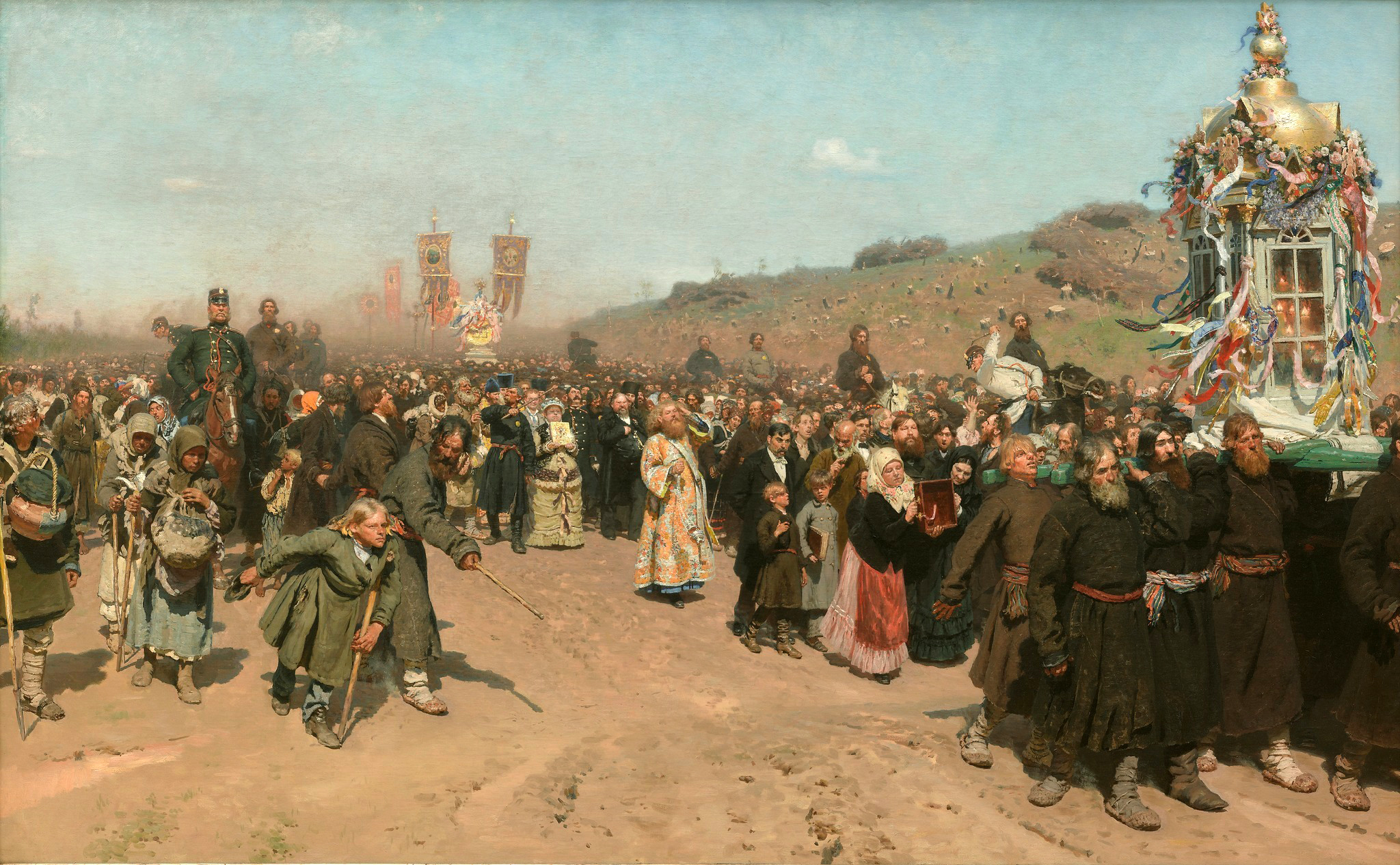
Procession of the Cross in Kursk Province by Ilya Repin (1880–1883; Tretyakov Gallery, Moscow)

The Eastern Orthodox and Eastern Catholics also commemorate the Procession of the Precious Wood of the Life-giving Cross of Jesus Christ on 1 August, which is also the first day of the Dormition Fast. The propers of the feast are combined with those of the Holy Maccabean Martyrs, the commemoration of whose endurance is deemed appropriate for the first day of a fast. Unlike the observance on 14 September, this commemoration is considered to be a minor feast, but it does have the bringing out of the cross and veneration by the faithful like the September feast.

The history of this feast begins in Constantinople where it was the custom to carry the relic of the True Cross through the streets and squares of the city to ask for God's blessing and for relief from sickness. On the eve of the feast (31 July), observed as a forefeast, it was taken out of the imperial treasury, and laid upon the altar of the "Great Church" (Hagia Sophia) and the following day solemnly placed in the middle of the Great Church for the faithful to venerate. It was taken in procession daily throughout the city, offering it to the people to venerate, until the Feast of the Dormition of the Theotokos (15 August), when it was returned to the imperial treasury.

In commemoration of this tradition, it is customary to have an outdoor procession with the Lesser Blessing of Water on August 1. It is the first of three "Feasts of the Saviour" in the month of August, the other two being the Transfiguration (6 August) and the Icon of Christ "Not Made by Hands" (16 August). Because of the blessing of holy water, this feast is sometimes called "Saviour of the Water". There may also be celebrated on this day the Rite of Blessing New Honey, for which reason the day is also referred to as "Saviour of the Honey".

According to Saint Nikolaj Velimirović, this feast was instituted by mutual agreement of the Greeks and Russians to commemorate the simultaneous victories of the Byzantine Emperor Manuel I Komnenos over the Bulgarians and the Russian Prince Andrei Bogolyubsky over the Saracens in the 12th century.

In the Russian Orthodox Church, this feast also celebrates the Baptism of Rus, which occurred on 1 August 988.

- Synaxarion

=== 12 October ===
In the Russian Orthodox Church, 12 October is the commemoration of the Translation of a Portion of the Life-Giving Cross from Malta to Gatchina. A portion of the Life-Giving Cross of the Lord, as well as the Philermos icon of the Mother of God and the right hand of John the Baptist were preserved on the island of Malta by the Knights of the Catholic Order of St. John of Jerusalem, who controlled the island.

In 1798, when the French seized the island, the Maltese Knights turned to the Russian Empire for defense and protection. To this end, they elected Paul I, the Tsar of Russia, as Grand Master of the Order. The Tsar accepted his election. On 12 October 1799, Maltese knights came to their new Priory Palace, just built for them by Paul in Gatchina (45 km [27 miles] south of Saint Petersburg), and offered these ancient and holy treasures to their new Grand Master, the tsar.

In the autumn of 1799 the holy items were transferred to St. Petersburg and placed in the Winter Palace within the internal church dedicated to the Icon of the Savior Not-Made-by-Hands. The feast for this event was established in 1800.

=== Moveable feasts ===
In addition to celebrations on fixed days, the Cross may be celebrated during the variable, particularly in Lent and Eastertide.

Eastern Christians celebrate an additional Veneration of the Cross on the third Sunday of Great Lent. The services for this day are modeled on the Feast of the Exaltation (14 September), and include bringing the cross to the holy table at little vespers and with solemnity out into the center of church at matins, albeit without the ceremony of the Exaltation of the Cross, for veneration by the faithful. It remains in the centre of the church for nearly a week (the Fourth Week of Great Lent). On the Monday and Wednesday of that week, a veneration of the Cross takes place at the First Hour (repeating a portion of the service from matins of the previous Sunday). On Friday of that week, the veneration takes place after the Ninth Hour, after which the priest and deacons return the cross to the sanctuary.

In addition to all of the above commemorations, Orthodox also hold Wednesday and Friday throughout the year as a commemoration of the Cross.

In the Roman Breviary before the 1961 reform, a Commemoration of the Cross was made during Eastertide, except when the office or commemoration of a double or octave occurred.

Orthodox Churches, the Roman Catholic Church, and some Anglican churches have a formal Veneration of the Cross during the services on Good Friday.

== Veneration of the Cross ==
=== Feast days ===
In the Eastern Orthodox Church, on several of the feast days mentioned above, there is a public veneration of the cross. It may take place at matins, after the cross is brought out, at the end of the celebration of the Divine Liturgy, or at the end of one of the Little Hours, depending upon the particular feast and local custom.

The faithful come forward and make two prostrations, make the sign of the cross on themselves, and kiss the feet of Christ on the cross, and then make a third prostration. After this, they will often receive a blessing from the priest and bow towards their fellow worshippers on each side of the church (this latter practice is most commonly observed in monasteries).

=== At the end of services ===
At the end of the Divine Liturgy, and at some other services as well, it is customary for the faithful to come forward and venerate the "Blessing Cross" (hand-cross) which is held by the bishop or priest, and to kiss his hand. This practice is also called the "Veneration of the Cross", though it does not involve making prostrations. The cross which is venerated is small (typically 10–16 inches). This cross is usually metal, often gold or gold-plated, and can be enameled or decorated with jewels. The figure of Jesus on the Cross (the soma) is usually engraved, enameled, or painted on the cross, rather than being a separate three-dimensional figure as is found on a crucifix.

== See also ==
- Dream of the Rood
- Ember days
