= Our Lady of Prompt Succor =

Title of the Blessed Virgin Mary

Our Lady of Prompt Succor The Madonna of New Orleans Patroness of Louisiana
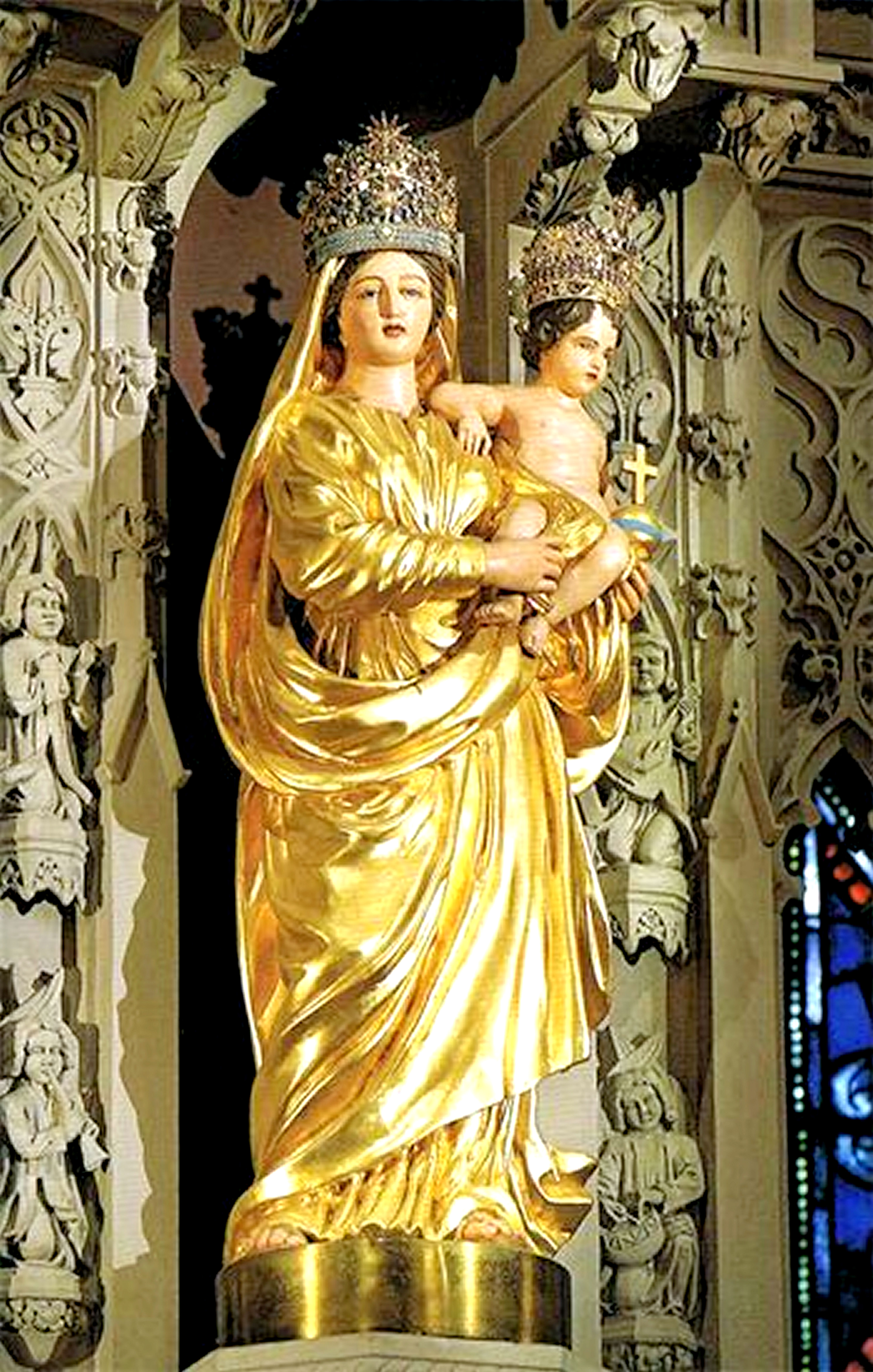
- The Canonically crowned image enshrined in the high altar
- Location: Louisiana, United States of America
- Date: 1810
- Witness: Mother Saint Michel; President Andrew Jackson
- Type: Golden wood image
- Approval: Pope Pius IX; Pope Leo XIII (Coronation); Pope Pius XI
- Shrine: The National Shrine of Our Lady of Prompt Succor
- Patronage: Louisiana (1928); Roman Catholic Archdiocese of New Orleans; Protection against hurricanes Castellammare del Golfo, Sicily, Italy; Kerċem

Our Lady of Prompt Succor (French: Notre-Dame du Prompt Secours) is a Roman Catholic title of the Blessed Virgin Mary. A wooden devotional image of the Madonna and Child is enshrined in New Orleans, Louisiana, United States of America. The events leading to this title of the Blessed Virgin were those of Mother Saint Michel, the Superior of the New Orleans Ursulines.

Pope Pius IX authorized the public devotion to Mary by the Marian title of Our Lady of Prompt Succor on 21 September 1851 and designated the 8th of January as the feast day of thanksgiving. Pope Leo XIII granted a Pontifical decree of Canonical Coronation to Mary by this title on 21 June 1894. The rite of coronation was executed by Archbishop Francis Janssens y August on 10 November 1895.

The Blessed Virgin Mary is also known by this title in connection to President Andrew Jackson who was present before the image during and after the Battle of New Orleans against the British invasion. Under this Marian title, the Virgin Mary is designated as the Principal Patroness of Louisiana and the Archdiocese of New Orleans dating from a 13 June 1928 Papal bull from the Sacred Congregation of Rites. The image is presently enshrined at the National Shrine of Our Lady of Prompt Succor while her feast day is celebrated on 8 January.

== History ==
French Ursuline nuns first arrived in Louisiana in 1727. The nuns established a convent and founded what is the oldest school for girls in the territory of the modern-day U.S., Ursuline Academy, which educated the children of European colonists, Native Americans, and those of the local Creole people, slave or free. Spanish sisters came to assist the growing school in 1763 after Louisiana fell under Spanish control.

In 1800 the territory came back under French possession, and in 1803, most of the sisters, fearing the anti-clerical sentiment of the French Revolution, fled to Havana, Cuba. When Louisiana passed into the control of the United States, the sisters sent the President a letter asking if their property rights would be honored by the new government. The response from President Thomas Jefferson is still kept at the convent to this day:

...I have received, holy sisters, the letter you have written me wherein you express anxiety for the property vested in your institutions by the former governments of Louisiana. The principles of the Constitution and government of the United States are a sure guarantee to you that it will be preserved to you sacred and inviolate, and that your institution will be permitted to govern itself according to its own voluntary rules, without interference from the civil authority.... Be assured it will meet all the protection which my office can give it.

Short of teachers, Mother Saint Andre Madier requested sisters from France to come to America to aid the struggling convent. She wrote to her cousin, Mother Saint Michel Gensoul, who was running a Catholic girls boarding school in France at the time. The Catholic Church was suffering the wrath of the revolution under Napoleon. Mother Saint Michel, knowing that the Church was in distress in both her homeland and abroad, approached Bishop Fournier of Montpelier to request a transfer. Bishop Fournier felt unable to afford the loss of another nun, as many had been killed or fled during the revolution, and advised Mother St. Michel that only the Pope could give this authorization.

Pope Pius VII was a prisoner of Napoleon at the time, and Mother St. Michel knew the unlikelihood of the Pope even receiving her letter. She prayed before a statue of the Blessed Virgin Mary and said: "O most Holy Virgin Mary, if you obtain for me a prompt and favorable answer to this letter, I promise to have you honored at New Orleans under the title of Our Lady of Prompt Succor."

Sending her petition on March 19, 1809, Mother St. Michel received a letter from the Pope Pius VII granting her request on 29 April 1809. Mother St. Michel commissioned a statue of the Virgin Mary holding the Infant Jesus. The workman carved her flowing robes so that she would appear to be moving quickly. Bishop Fournier blessed the statue and Mother St. Michel's work.

Mother St. Michel arrived in New Orleans with the statue of Our Lady of Prompt Succor on December 31, 1810, with several postulants. The statue was placed in the monastery chapel of the Old Ursuline Convent on Chartres Street in the French Quarter.

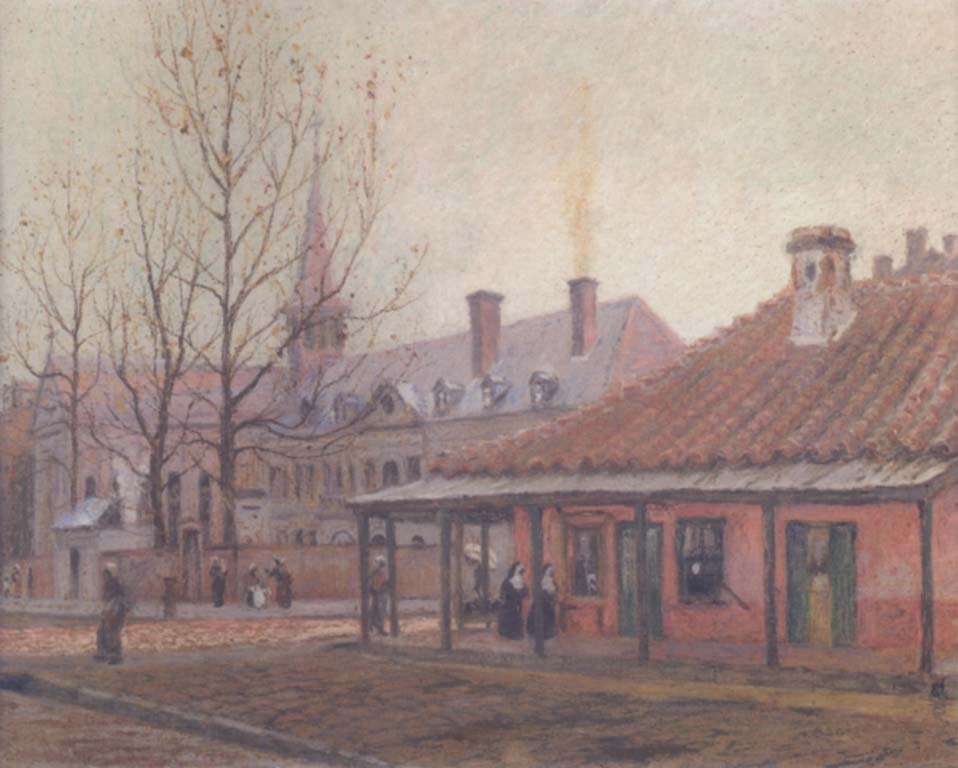
The Ursuline Convent, Chartres Street. Circa 1902.

== Miracles ==
Many miracles have been attributed to the intercession of the Blessed Virgin Mary under the title of Our Lady of Prompt Succor. Two historical events are especially associated with the Virgin. The first occurred in 1812 during the eruption of a great fire in New Orleans devastating the Vieux Carré. The Ursuline convent was facing imminent destruction as the winds blew the terrible fire toward the Plaza de Armas. An order was given to evacuate the convent, however at that moment, a nun named Sr. St. Anthony (Marthe Delatre, daughter of Antoine Delatre) placed a small statue of Our Lady of Prompt Succor on a window seat and Mother St. Michel began to pray aloud, "Our Lady of Prompt Succor, we are lost unless you hasten to our aid!" Immediately, the wind shifted direction, blowing the flames away from the convent allowing for the fire to be extinguished. The Ursuline convent was one of the few buildings spared from destruction.

The second major miracle occurred in 1815, three years after the disastrous fire. General Andrew Jackson's 6,000 American troops faced 15,000 British soldiers on the plains of Chalmette. On the eve of the Battle of New Orleans, New Orleans residents joined the Ursuline sisters at their convent in the French Quarter to pray throughout the night, imploring the help of Our Lady of Prompt Succor. On the morning of January 8, the Very Rev. Louis William DuBourg, Vicar General, offered Mass at the altar on which the statue of Our Lady of Prompt Succor had been placed. Cannon fire could be heard from the chapel. The Prioress of the Ursuline convent, Mother Ste. Marie Olivier de Vezin, made a vow to have a Mass of Thanksgiving sung annually should the American forces win. At the very moment of communion, a courier ran into the chapel to inform all those present that the British had been defeated. They had become confused by a fog and wandered into a swamp. The Mass ended with the singing of the Te Deum. An annual Mass of Thanksgiving has been held January 8 ever since. The 200th anniversary of the Battle of New Orleans occurred in 2015, and commemorative events were held.

== Pontifical approbations ==
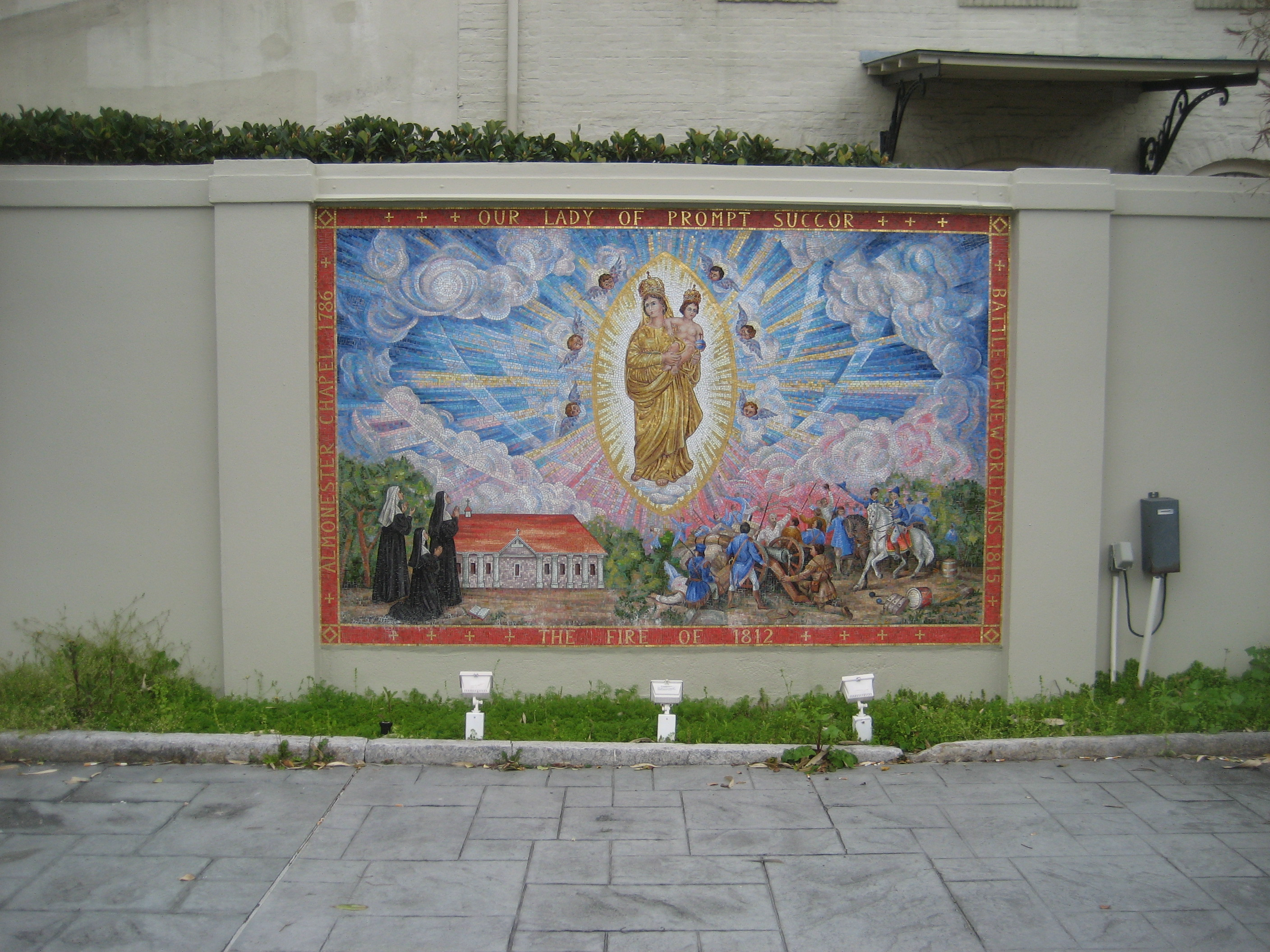
A mosaic of Our Lady of Prompt Succor at the Old Ursuline Convent complex, French Quarter, New Orleans.

- On 21 September 1851, Pope Pius IX authorized the devotion and celebration of the Feast of Our Lady of Prompt Succor and the singing of the yearly Mass of Thanksgiving on January 8.
- On 21 June 1894, Pope Leo XIII approved the Canonical Coronation of the wooden image with an accompanying Papal bull from the Sacred Congregation for the Propagation of the Faith and was carried out by Archbishop Francis Janssens on 10 November 1895. The gold and precious stones for the crowns were donated by the people of New Orleans. On 28 April 1897, same Pontiff issued a papal document erecting the Confraternity of Our Lady of Prompt Succor elevating their status to the rank of Archconfraternity.
- On 13 June 1928, Pope Pius XI declared the Blessed Virgin Mary, under the title of Our Lady of Prompt Succor as the Patroness of Louisiana. The request was granted from a petition by the Archbishop of New Orleans, John William Shaw; Bishop of Alexandria, Cornelius Van de Ven; and, Bishop of Lafayette, Jules B. Jeanmard. The papal decree was executed and signed by Cardinal Camillo Laurenti of the Sacred Congregation of Rites.

== Interpretation ==
According to Michael Pasquier, promotion of devotion to the Marian title of Our Lady of Prompt Succor was an attempt by the Catholic hierarchy to ease tensions in a Catholic population divided over a French Creole Catholicism and an Anglo-Catholic hierarchy in Baltimore. He maintains that the devotion never garnered a widespread following due to its "lack of multi-ethnic appeal" to minority groups at the time. The cultus of Our Lady of Prompt Succor was a devotion particular to the French Ursulines, which involved neither a miraculous apparition nor a particular message to engage the imaginations of the laity.

== Veneration of our Lady of Prompt Succor ==
Our Lady of Prompt Succor is the patroness of the state of Louisiana, and of the city of New Orleans.

Pious believers of New Orleans pray before the statue of Our Lady of Prompt Succor, asking for her intercession whenever a hurricane threatens the city. During hurricane season, prayers are said at every Mass in the city during the Prayers of the Faithful requesting Our Lady of Prompt Succor's intercession and protection. After Hurricane Katrina, prayers were made to Our Lady of Prompt Succor asking for the quick recovery of the damaged city and surrounding area.

=== National Shrine ===
The statue of Our Lady of Prompt Succor was moved from the Old Ursuline convent in the French Quarter to the National Shrine of Our Lady of Prompt Succor, located on the State Street campus of Ursuline Academy and Convent. The National Votive Shrine of Our Lady of Prompt Succor was constructed during the 1920s and consecrated on January 6, 1928. The Shrine is the responsibility of the Ursuline Sisters of the Roman Union, Central Province.

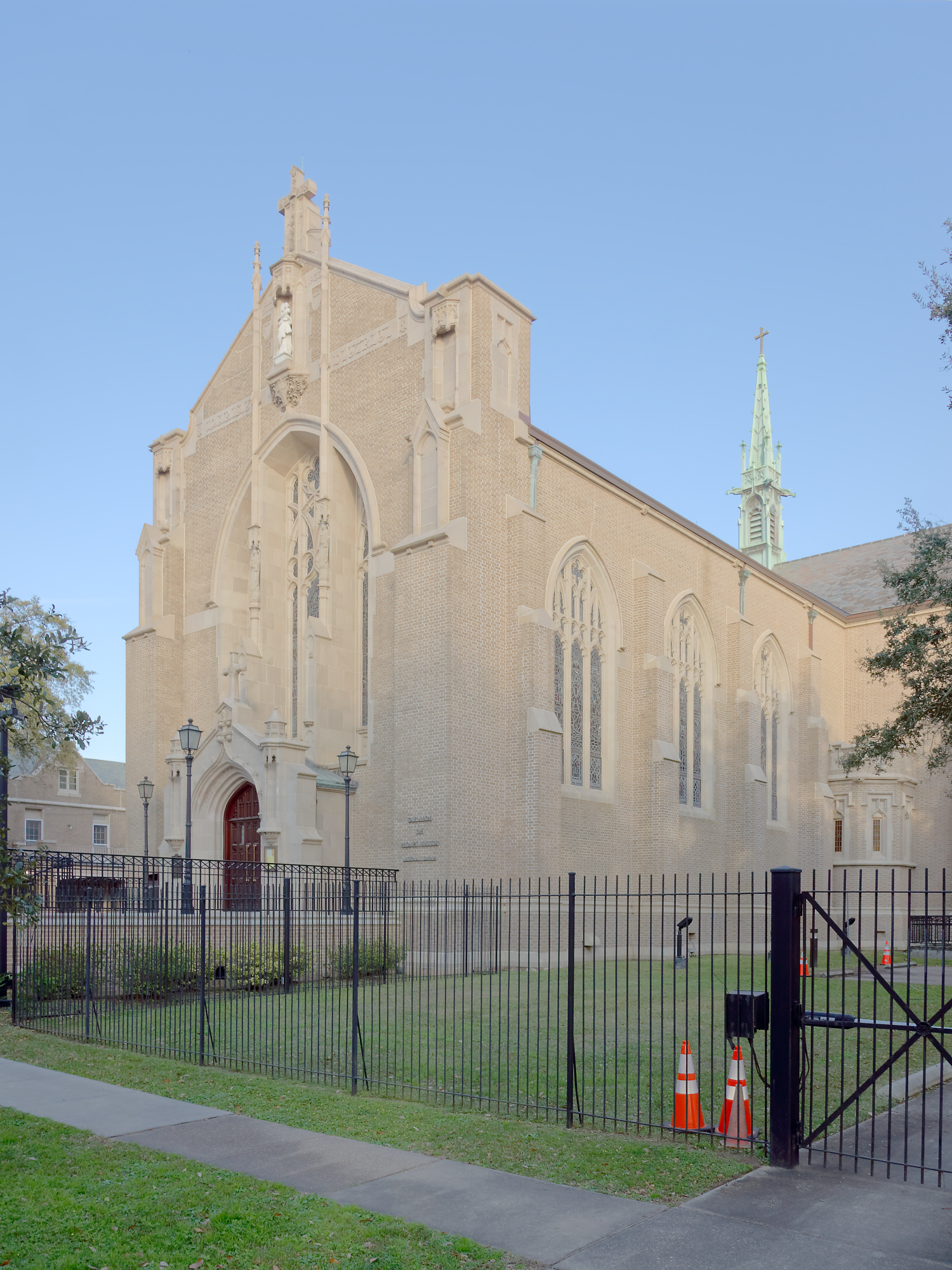
Current shrine, Ursuline Academy campus

The Old Ursuline Convent is located at 1100 Chartres Street in the French Quarter. The attached chapel is now known as St. Mary's. The church and the convent are open for tours daily.

=== Servants of Our Lady of Prompt Succor ===
The Servants of Our Lady of Prompt Succor are members of the New York Chapter of the Archconfraternity of Our Lady of Prompt Succor; established in 2000. The Archconfraternity of New Orleans is headquartered at the National Shrine of Our Lady of Prompt Succor, New Orleans, Louisiana.

In response to Jesus’ words on the cross to Saint John the Apostle, '(Gospel of John 19:27)':“Behold, Your Mother” as His Blood ran down the cross, the mission of the Servants is to honor the Blessed Virgin Mary as Mother and protectress of the country, by working to promote and extend devotion to the Mother of God under the title of Our Lady of Prompt Succor, throughout the United States and the world, following the statutes of same Archconfraternity.

The Servants sponsor the Traditional Latin Mass in honor of Our Lady of Prompt Succor, as well as the Byzantine Divine Liturgy, beseeching the Blessed Virgin Mary to intercede before Her Son for the conversion and sanctification of the United States and its protection of human life in all its stages.

When the statue of Our Lady of Prompt Succor arrived in the United States, Her first stop was Philadelphia, the home of its Declaration of Independence and Constitution. Her second stop was Maryland, site of what would become the first Catholic Cathedral, named for the Assumption. After the threat of yellow fever in New Orleans subsided, the sisters who accompanied the statue would finally arrive at the Ursuline convent in New Orleans in 1810. The statue would later be enthroned at the National Votive Shrine on State Street.

On the first visit to this Votive Shrine, those who would become confraternity members encountered the miraculous statue. They were given a tour by Ursuline nun Sister Angela Murphy, who mentioned she was praying to Our Lady of Prompt Succor for a confraternity in New York. Within 12 months, the Confraternity was established there, with approbation from the Shrine Director; who later raised it to an Archconfraternity. The Servants also pray for the custodians of the National Shrine and for holy departed souls, including those in the Ursuline mausoleum on their grounds, some of whom were part of the miracle in 1815.

== Bibliography ==
- Cruz OCDS, Joan Carroll. Miraculous Images of Our Lady, TAN Books and Publishers, 1993, ISBN 0-89555-484-4
- Cormack, Margaret Jean - Saints and Their Cults in the Atlantic World - University of South Carolina, 2007. PP- 128-146
