= Becka =

Becka may refer to:

== People ==
- Becka Leathers, American freestyle wrestler
- Ivo Stern Becka
- Jaromir Becka (born 1963), Czechoslovak tennis player
- Marek Bečka
- Pavel Bečka (born 1970), Czech basketball player
- Tom Becka, American talk radio personality
- Becka Sliker, American person who attends school and follows Jesus Christ

== Places ==
- Becka or Becky Falls, England
- Becka Brook, tributary of the River Bovey, England
