= Bowerman's Nose =

Stack of weathered granite on Dartmoor, Devon, England

Coordinates: 50.61061°N 3.77932°W

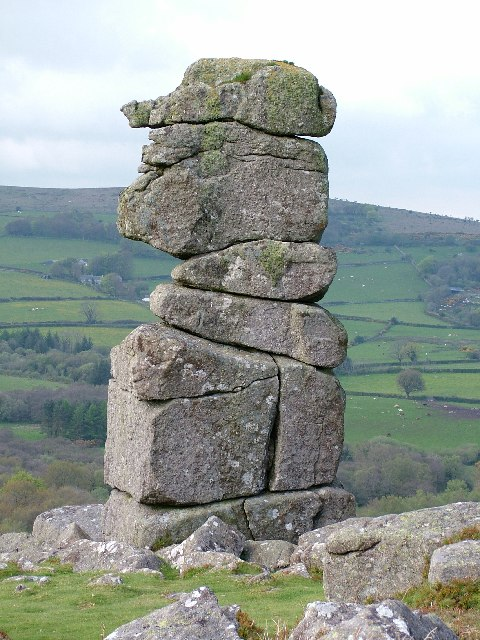
Bowerman's Nose

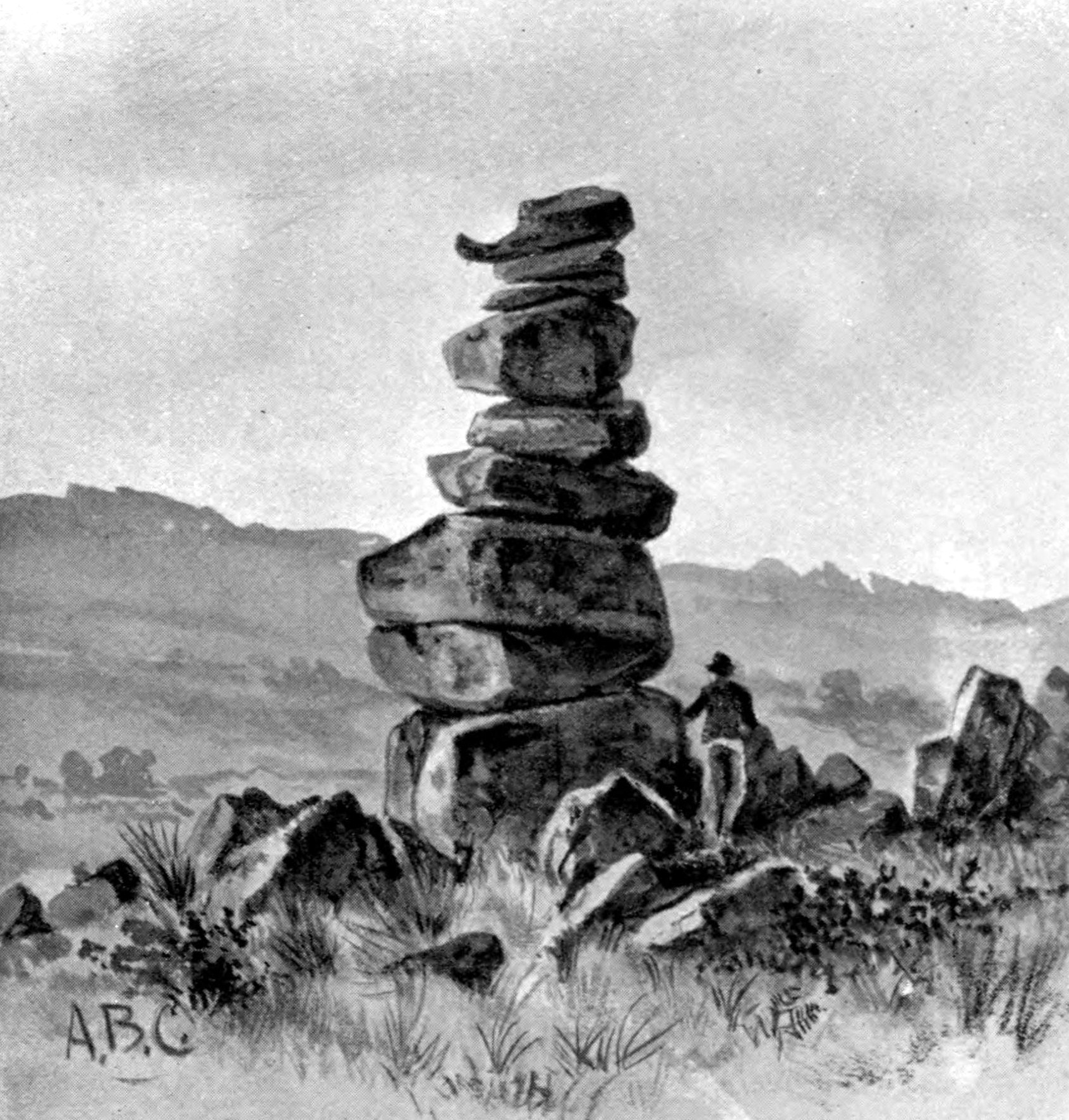
A not very accurate depiction from Baring-Gould's A Book of Dartmoor (1907)

Bowerman's Nose is a stack of weathered granite on Dartmoor, Devon, England. It is situated on the northern slopes of Hayne Down, about a mile from Hound Tor and close to the village of Manaton at grid reference SX742805. It is about 21.5 feet (6.6 m) high and is the hard granite core of a former tor, standing above a 'clitter' of the blocks that have eroded and fallen from it.

== Descriptions ==
The height of the stack was exaggerated by early writers, and it was also regularly described as an ancient object of veneration. For example, Richard Polwhele described it in around 1800 as fifty feet high, and in the 1820s Carrington wrote of it:

On the very edge
Of the vast moorland, startling every eye,
A shape enormous rises! High it towers
Above the hill's bold brow, and, seen from far,
Assumes the human form;—a Granite God!—
To whom, in days long flown, the suppliant knee
In trembling homage bow'd. The hamlets near
Have legends rude connected with the spot,
(Wild swept by every wind,) on which he stands—
The Giant of the Moor.

— N. T. Carrington, Dartmoor: A Descriptive Poem.

In his contemporary notes to Carrington's poem, W. Burt stated that the rocks rise to more than 30 feet, and he also mentioned that it was generally considered as a rock idol, dismissing those who doubted that druids were associated with the moor. Samuel Rowe in 1848 reckoned it was rather less than forty feet tall and likened it to the statues on Easter Island, saying that "it is easy to conceive that [it] might have been pointed out to an ignorant and deluded people as the object of worship". He also said that from the higher ground to the south, its appearance was of a "Hindoo idol, in a sitting posture".

By 1889, John Page wrote in his Exploration of Dartmoor that it was "nearly forty feet", but discounted the "rock idol" tradition. John Chudleigh wrote in 1892 that from Manaton it looked like a Turk with a fez cap and mantle wrapped closely around his body. By 1907 it was still being described in Ward Lock's Red Guide to Dartmoor as "forty or fifty feet" tall.

With a little imagination, it is possible to see the profile of a human face in the rocky outline, but as John Page said in 1889: "If his nose bore any resemblance to the topmost layer of the pile, it cannot have boasted much comeliness." Other writers have seen the topmost layer as a cap, for instance Ruth St. Leger-Gordon wrote in 1965: "With grey cap pushed well back from a face consisting mainly of the parrot-like feature which gives him his name...".

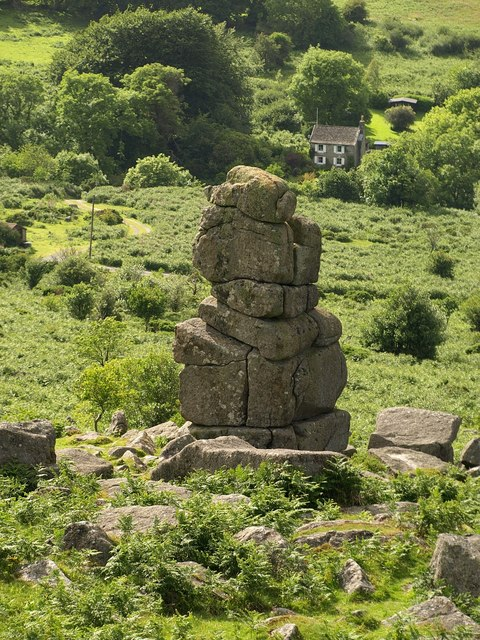
The stack as seen from the top of Hayne Down

== Toponymy ==
It used to be held that the name Bowerman was derived from the Celtic fawr maen, meaning "the great stone", but this theory was refuted by R. Hansford Worth who pointed out that the correct Celtic form would have been maen fawr, so it could not have mutated into Bowerman.

Another derivation, noted by Burt, was that Bowerman was a hunter (a "bow-man") who lived in the nearby village of Hundatorra at the time of William the Conqueror. However, Eric Hemery noted that a John Bowerman was buried at North Bovey in 1663 and that the name also appears in a Dean Prior register of 1772, so it is possible that the name is of no great antiquity.

== Legend ==
Not only is Bowerman's Nose a spectacular rock formation, which appears on many local postcards and calendars, but it is also the subject of Dartmoor folklore.

One version of the local legend relates that a huntsman called Bowerman lived on the moor about a thousand years ago. When chasing a hare he and his pack of dogs unwittingly ran into a coven of witches, overturned their cauldron and disrupted their ceremony. They decided to punish him, and the next time he was hunting, one of the witches turned herself into a hare, and led both Bowerman and his hounds into a mire. As a final punishment, she turned them to stone - the dogs can be seen as a jagged chain of rocks on top of Hound Tor, while the huntsman himself became the rock formation now known as Bowerman's Nose.

== See also ==
- List of geographical noses
