= Becky Falls =

Waterfall and tourist attraction in Devon, England

Coordinates: 50°36′26″N 3°45′4″W

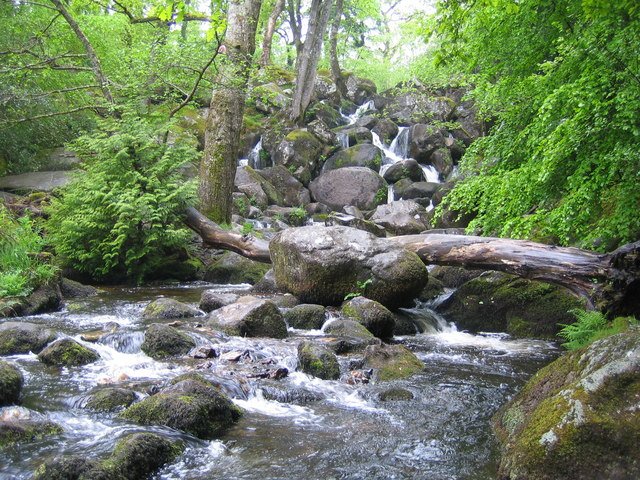
Becky Falls

Becky Falls, originally known as Becka Falls, is a tourist attraction in Dartmoor, England, centered on a waterfall of around 20 metres down a boulder-strewn bed. In addition to the waterfall as the centrepiece, there is a woodland park with features such as a children's zoo, woodland trail, and crafts.

== Waterfall ==
The waterfall is on the Becka Brook, one of the main tributaries of the River Bovey. The brook rises just South of Hound Tor, and continues through Becky Falls before reaching the Bovey just below Trendlebere Down.

As the brook passes through, there are two sets of waterfalls created, with a drop of around 20 metres.

The falls were originally known as Becka Falls, including on Ordnance Survey maps up until the 1940s, but the name was changed when it became a tourist attraction.

== See also ==
- List of waterfalls
- List of waterfalls in England
