= River Bovey =

River in Devon, England

Coordinates: 50°34′N 3°37′W

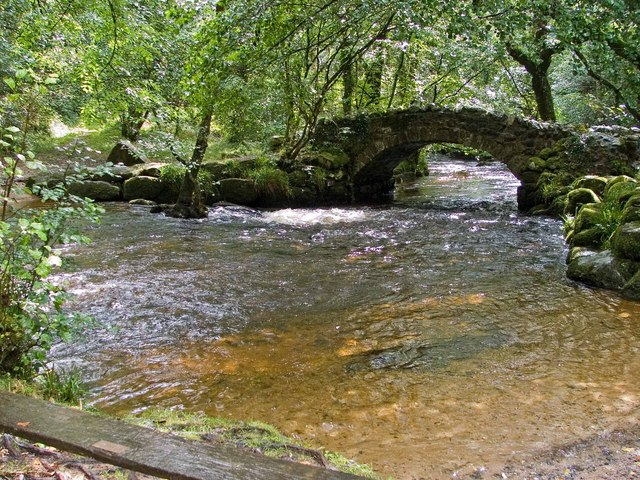
- The River Bovey passing over a ford and under Hisley Bridge

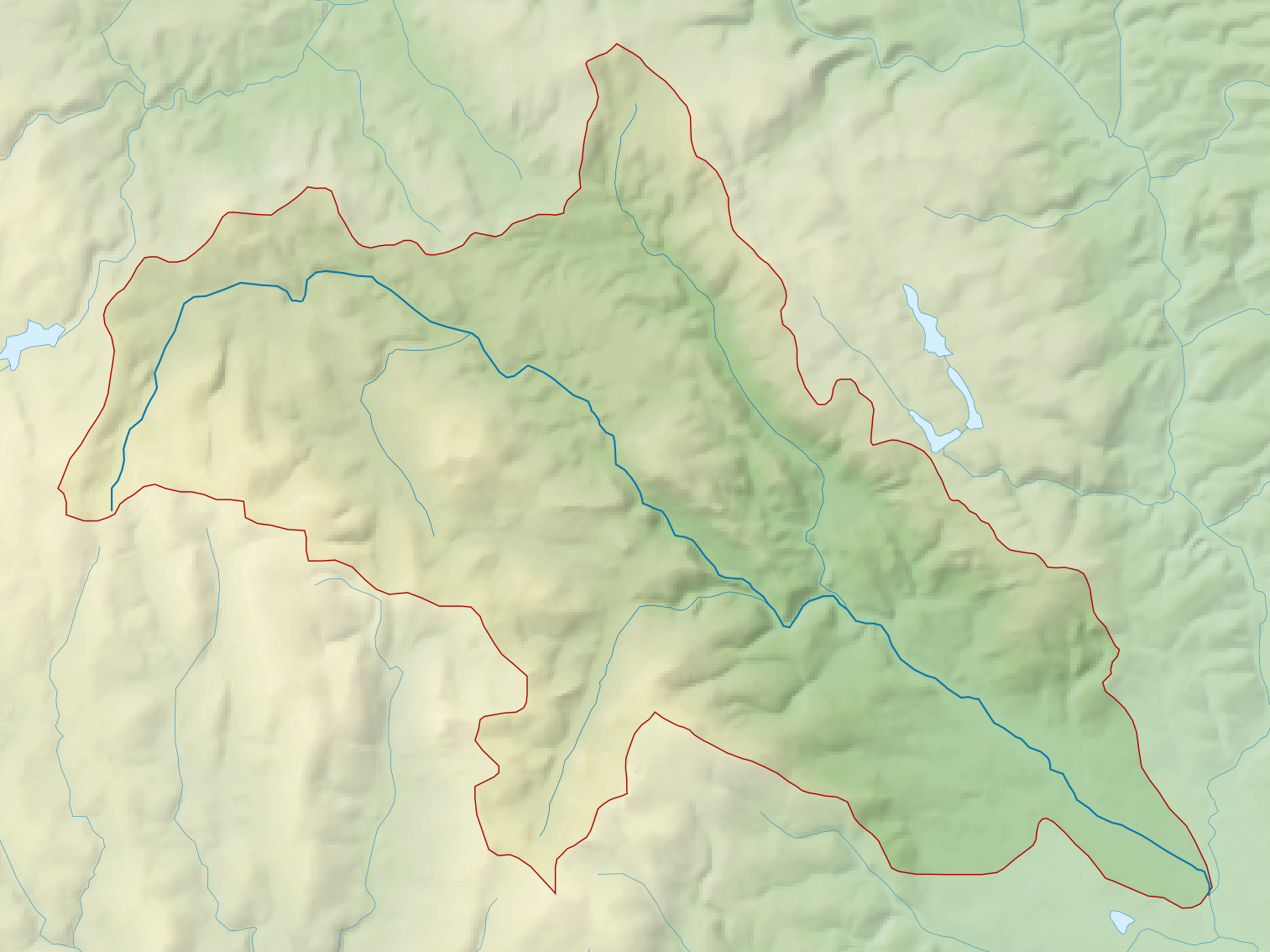
- Catchment of the River Bovey

Location
- Country: England
- County: Devon
- Towns: North Bovey; Manaton; Lustleigh; Bovey Tracey

Basin features
- Tributaries
  - left: Becka Brook, Wray Brook

The River Bovey rises on the eastern side of Dartmoor in Devon, England, and is the largest tributary to the River Teign. The river has two main source streams, both rising within a mile of each other, either side of the B3212 road between Moretonhampstead and Postbridge, before joining at Jurston.

The river flows for about two miles northwards from source before turning to a generally south easterly direction. It passes the village of North Bovey, flows through the Lustleigh Cleave between the villages of Manaton and Lustleigh, and then through the town of Bovey Tracey. It joins the River Teign on the boundary between the parishes of Teigngrace and Kingsteignton, about a mile south of the village of Chudleigh Knighton.

== Catchment ==
The catchment of the river runs to the West at Chagford Common, past Hookney Tor, and the road from Fordgate to Hound Tor. To the south, the watershed is with the River Lemon and runs from Hemsworthy Gate to Haytor Rocks, past Brimley and to the north of Stover Country Park.

The Eastern boundary runs between Chudleigh Knighton to Doccombe, and in the north, is runs in a line from just outside Moretonhampstead to Meldon Hill, south of Chagford.

== Tributaries ==
There are two main tributaries, one being the Becka Brook, rising near Hound Tor, flowing through Becky Falls, and joining the Bovey just below Trendlebere Down. The second is the Wray Brook which starts north of Moretonhampstead, and joins the Bovey to the south of Lustleigh.

== Naming influence ==
The river gives its name to the Bovey Formation, a geological sedimentary basin which is the major source in England for ball clay.

The towns of North Bovey and Bovey Tracey both take their name from the river, as does Bovey Castle, a luxury hotel close to the river outside North Bovey.
