= Medieval village of Geridu (Sardinia) =

Medieval abandoned village of Geridu (Sardinia)

Geridu
- Medieval Village
- The Medieval Village of Geridu
- Interactive map of Geridu
- Coordinates: 40°46′50″N 8°34′25″E
- Country: Italy
- Region: Sardinia
- Province: Sassari
- Founded: Middle Ages

The Medieval village of Geridu is an abandoned settlement in northern Sardinia, Italy, between Sorso and Sennori. It is the only medieval site on the island where large-scale excavations have been conducted.

The site of the medieval village of Geridu was already inhabited before the Middle Ages, during Late Antiquity it was occupied by a farm or rural settlement linked to the exploitation of agricultural resources. The decline of Geridu's population began in the late 14th century, and according to historical sources, the village was abandoned in the early 15th century, sometime before 1427.

The site continues to be promoted by cultural organizations in Sardinia as a place of archaeological and historical interest.

Geridu is under protection of the Italian Ministry of Culture, which lists it among abandoned medieval heritage site.

== Location ==
Map of Sorso, Sardinia

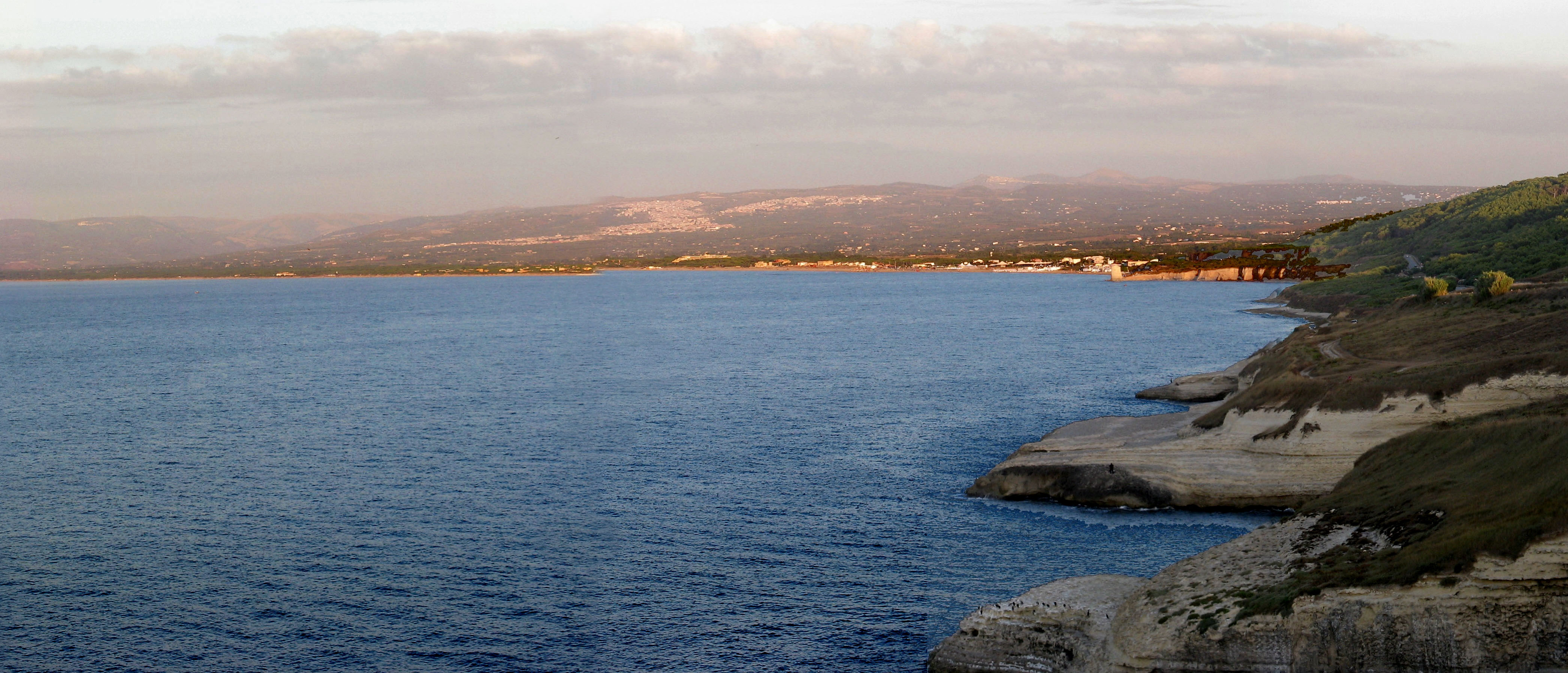
The Gulf of Asinara, near the medieval village of Geridu.

The medieval village of Geridu is located within the municipal territory of Sorso, northern Sardinia. The site is about 2 kilometers from the village of Sorso and 10 kilometers from the city of Sassari. The village is situated near the St.Andrew's "cave" and alongside Provincial Road 25, which connects the town of Sorso with nearby Sennori.

The village is located on a hill in the Nurra plain, from which it is possible to see the Tyrrhenian Sea and the Gulf of Asinara. The area of the plain is rural; in fact, there are no significant modern constructions. The soil is particularly fertile, supporting various crops, among which vineyards and olive groves are the most prominent.

== Etymology ==
The first mention of the name of the village appeared in the Condaghe di San Pietro di Silki (1122), here the form Gereti appeared, a term likely derived from the Latin word for "villa Gereti", a hypothesis that would explain the genitive ending.

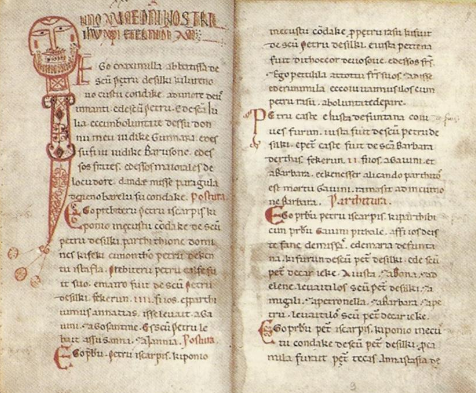
Condaghe di San Pietro di Silki: first page of the manuscript

The first form was Geriti, it was considered the most correct spelling and it prevailed from 1287 and continued throughout the fourteenth century; despite this fact, several variants appeared in literature and written sources.

During the 14th century, in fact, the form Geriti began to alternate in Aragonese documents with other different forms such as:

- Leriti
- Giriti
- Gireti
- Girate

and more rarely:

- Gerta
- Geritino: Latin translation of the Catalan Geritì

The form Geredi appeared in 1426, due to the Sardinian linguistic phenomenon that transformed the intervocalic letter t into d. In 1629, the form Heredi appeared, this version seems to reflect the Castilian pronunciation.

From the 16th century, the variants Geridi and Geridu became widespread, and today the place name is attested as Geridu (in Sorso and Sassari) and Zeridu (in Sennori).

The name of the village has been distorted throughout time, due to bibilical influence, in particular the phonetic similarity between Geriti and Gerici have confused authors and copyist, which have led to mistakenly link the toponym to the biblical city Jericho.

The origin of this error can be traced to the frequent confusion, in medieval paleography, between the letters c and t. Non-Sardinian scribes, when transcribing, could have read Gerici instead of Geriti, this misunderstanding could have led to other confusion with other Sardinian villages, such as Gèsico (province of Cagliari) and Silìqua (province of Cagliari), attested in fourteenth-century sources with the forms Yelicho and Xilico.

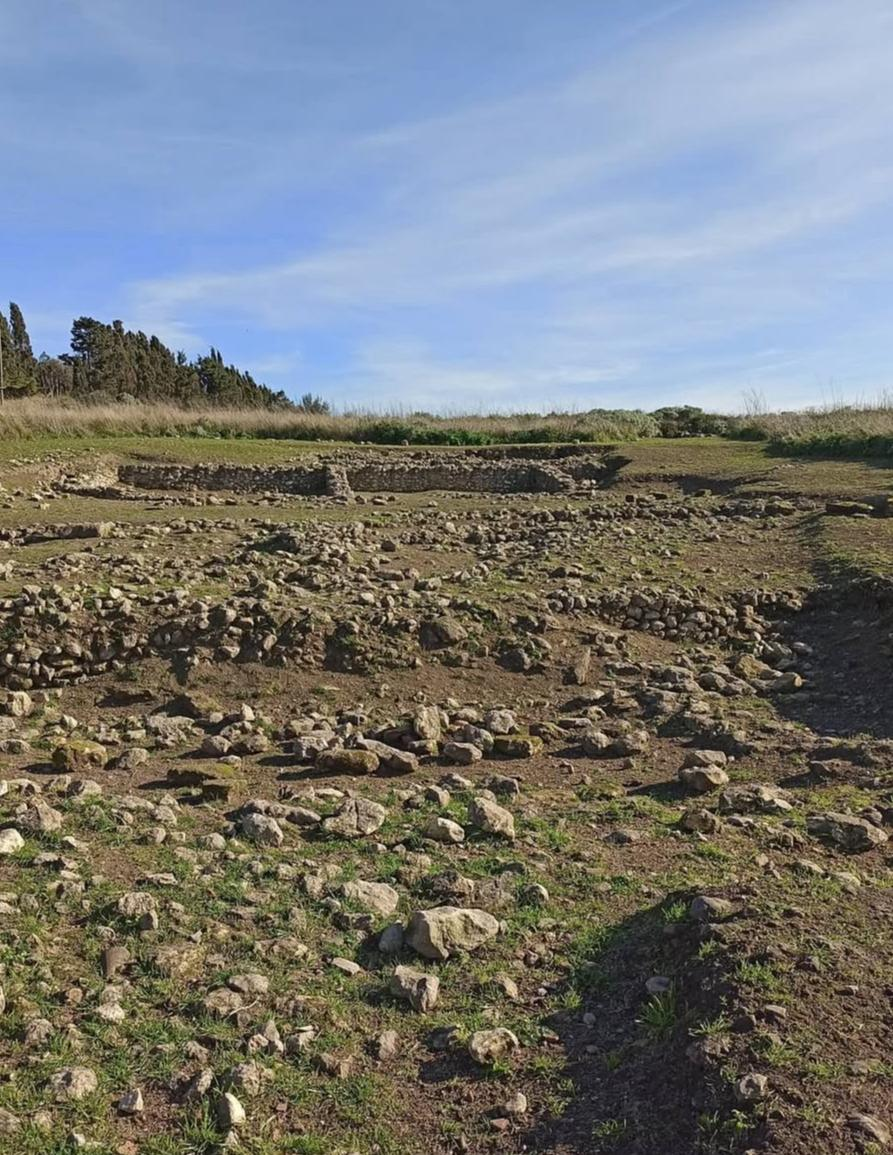
View of the Geridu archaeological site

== History ==
=== Early occupation ===
The site of Geridu was first inhabited in pre-medieval times, during the protohistoric and Roman periods. In Late Antiquity it housed a farm or rural settlement linked to the exploitation of the surrounding land. Current research has not yet pinpointed the exact date of the medieval settlement of Geridu, but some scholars suggest that a new village was founded around the year 1100 on top of an earlier Roman occupation. The Condaghe di San Pietro documents the existence of Geridu in entries dated 1112 and 1129.

=== Medieval foundation and regional context ===
Geridu's population chose this site for several reasons: the hill offered fertile soil, abundant water resources, a mild climate and a strategic location close to both the coast and the city of Sassari. These conditions made Geridu an important reference point for rural communities in northern Sardinia throughout the Middle Ages. The village lay within the Curatoria of Romangia, an administrative district of the Judicate of Torres, together with nearby settlements such as Sorso, Sennori, Gennor, Taniga and Uruspe, which formed one of the most economically active areas of the Logudoro region.

Reliable written information is scarce before the late thirteenth century, but sources indicate that by this time Geridu had developed into a substantial rural centre. In the thirteenth and fourteenth centuries it was one of the most populous settlements in Romangia, reaching a peak of about 1,250 inhabitants around 1320.

=== Economy and trade ===
During its peak, Geridu benefited from a flourishing agrarian economy based on cereal cultivation, vineyards, orchards, gardens and livestock farming on the surrounding pastures. Documentary and archaeological evidence point to close links with merchants from Pisa and Genoa, and to the presence of monastic communities active in the cultural and economic development of inland Logudoro.

Excavations conducted by University of Sassari's researchers have brought to light numerous coins and imported ceramics alongside local pottery, indicating that the inhabitants participated in wider Mediterranean trade networks and were able to acquire non-essential and prestige goods. Recent discoveries of Sicilian and Tunisian wares dated to the eleventh and twelfth centuries suggest that the area was already economically active before the high medieval peak, and that the standard of living in Geridu was comparable to that of urban mercantile communities such as Pisa and Genoa.

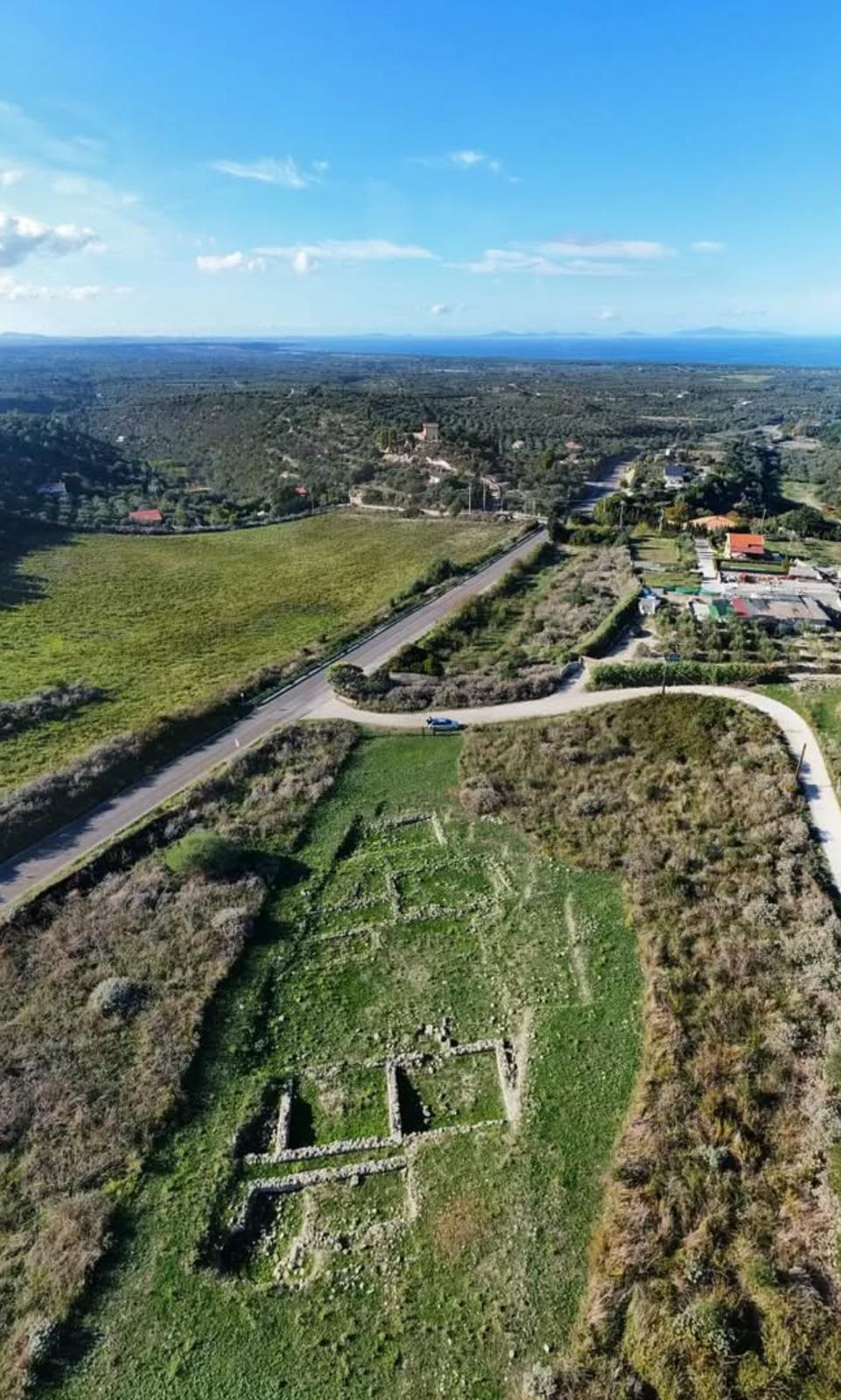
Aerial view of medieval village of Geridu, Sorso

=== Political framework and fourteenth-century crises ===
After the conquest of Sardinia by the Crown of Aragon (1323–1326), Geridu became involved in the changing balance of power between the municipality of Sassari, royal authority and local feudal lords. Although treaties initially stipulated that Sassari and its dependent villages could not be separated from the royal domain, Geridu was repeatedly granted as a fief to Catalan nobles in return for military and financial obligations, provoking protests and legal disputes from the city.

During the fourteenth century the village alternated between direct royal administration and private lordship, while the wider region was affected by conflicts involving Sassari, powerful noble families and the Judicate of Arborea, as well as anti-Aragonese revolts. These political tensions, together with heavier fiscal pressure, social conflict and episodes of violence, contributed to a gradual worsening of living conditions in the countryside. From the mid-fourteenth century onward, repeated crises, warfare and epidemic disease set the stage for the progressive depopulation and eventual abandonment of Geridu in the early fifteenth century (see Village abandonment below).

Geridu - Political and Institutional Framework (1323-1444)
**before 1323 - 1325**	**Municipality of Sassari**
1324	nominal Aragonese enfeoffment to Guillem Oulomar
**1325 -1334**	**Fief of Thomas Ça-Costa**
1327 or 1328	vicarius (?) Bernat Puculull
1332	maior de villa Barisone de Naviçan
1333	procurator Guillem de Solà
1332 -1334	vicarius Ramon Guerau
**1334**	**Fief of Ramon Ça-Costa**
**1334 - 1336**	**Royal aragonese Curia**
1334, 29–1 December, 335, 31 October	vicarius Vicent Perez
**1336 - 1337**	**Ramon de Cadorna**
**1337**	**Fief of Guillem de Bellvis**
**1337 - 1338**	**Lope de Genestar**
**1338**	**Royal Aragonese Curia**
**1339 - 1354**	**Fief of Miquel Perez Çapata**
1342	vicarius Eniego Eximenis d’Ahe
after 1342	vicarius Johan Perez de Vallcochan
1349	maior de villa Blasio Seche
1345(?) - 1354	vicarius Pere Eximenis de Lumbierra
**1355**	**Royal Aragonese Curia**: Castle of Sassari - village mayors at the Parliament of Cagliari
**1366 - 1388**	**Judicate of Arborea**
1371	nominal aragonese enfeoffment to March Castaner
**1391 - ...**	**Fief of Galceran de Santacoloma**
**1427 - 1434**	**Royal Aragonese Curia - Sassari**
**1434 - 1436**	**Pietro Spano**
**1436**	**Pedro de Ferrera**
**1436 - 1444**	**Gonario Gambella**

Bold numbers represent the various eras of governance over Geridu, including rule by the Municipality of Sassari, the Catalan-Aragonese feudal lords, the Royal Aragonese Court, and the Arborean judiciary. The remaining numbers correspond to vicars, procurators, mayors, and village chiefs.

== Village abandonment ==
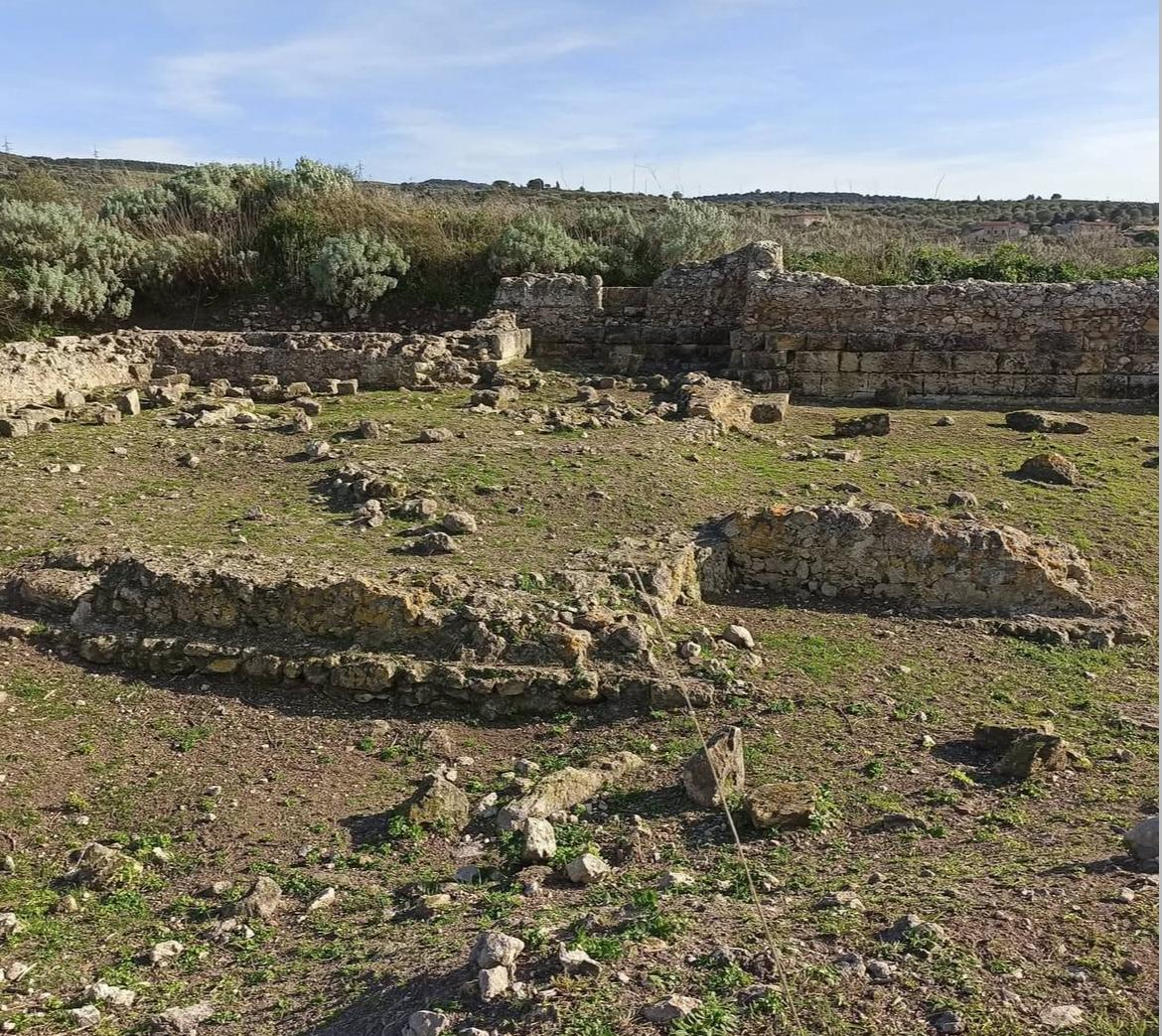
Stone remains of a large residential structure in the medieval village of Geridu (Sorso, Sardinia).

Archaeological, documentary and stratigraphic evidence indicate that the medieval village of Geridu was progressively abandoned between the second half of the fourteenth century and the early fifteenth century, during the Arborean occupation of Romangia (1366–1388).

=== Causes and dynamics of depopulation ===
Scholars show that the abandonment was caused by the combination of several different factors:

1. Fiscal and economic difficulties: after the process of feudalization caused by the Catalan-Aragonese settlement, rural communities faced high taxes, subjected both to the fiscal pressure imposed by the Municipality of Sassari and to that of the Catalan authorities. Furthermore, loans were often given on harsh terms, this situation significantly increased debt and worsened the living condition of the population.
2. Local conflicts and wars: Geridu was deeply affected by the conflict between Sassari, the Doria family, and the Giudicato of Arborea, followed by anti-Aragonese rebellions. Evidence of destruction show several military incursions and also wartime damage, some evidence are: ruined crops, loss of agricultural labour caused by forced recruitment, arrests and deportations. These pressure forced the inhabitants to abandon the village and to move to safer fortified centres like Sassari or Osilo.
3. Episodes of Destruction and Spoliation: several structures show evidence of heavy destruction. Some buildings collapsed while others were set on fire.
4. Plagues and epidemics: anthropological and paleopathological analyses found mass graves that can be attributed to epidemic diseases, such as great waves of the Black Death that struck the island in the 14th century. Because of these epidemics, the population of Geridu was reduced by half.
5. Economic Crisis and Reduction in Coinage in Use: coins became less common after the first decades of Aragonese settlement. From the second half of the 14th century, coins were rarely found in archaeological contexts, this fact shows a gradual economic slowdown and a reduction in trade.

The Process of Abandonment

The village's decline was a gradual process. Excavations and stratigraphic studies show phases of destruction, partial reuse and recovery of building materials. In that period, some houses were damaged by fire and later reoccupied, other buildings were dismantled and their stones, roof timbers and tiles were reused in the nearby settlements.

At the beginning of the 15th century Geridu no longer functioned as a permanent settlement. In fact, only a few rural churches remained in the village, for instance the churches of San Biagio and Sant'Andrea. The latter was still in use in the 16th century and then, in the mid-19th century it was demolished and the parish church of San Pantaleo in Sorso was built.

== Site and archaeology ==
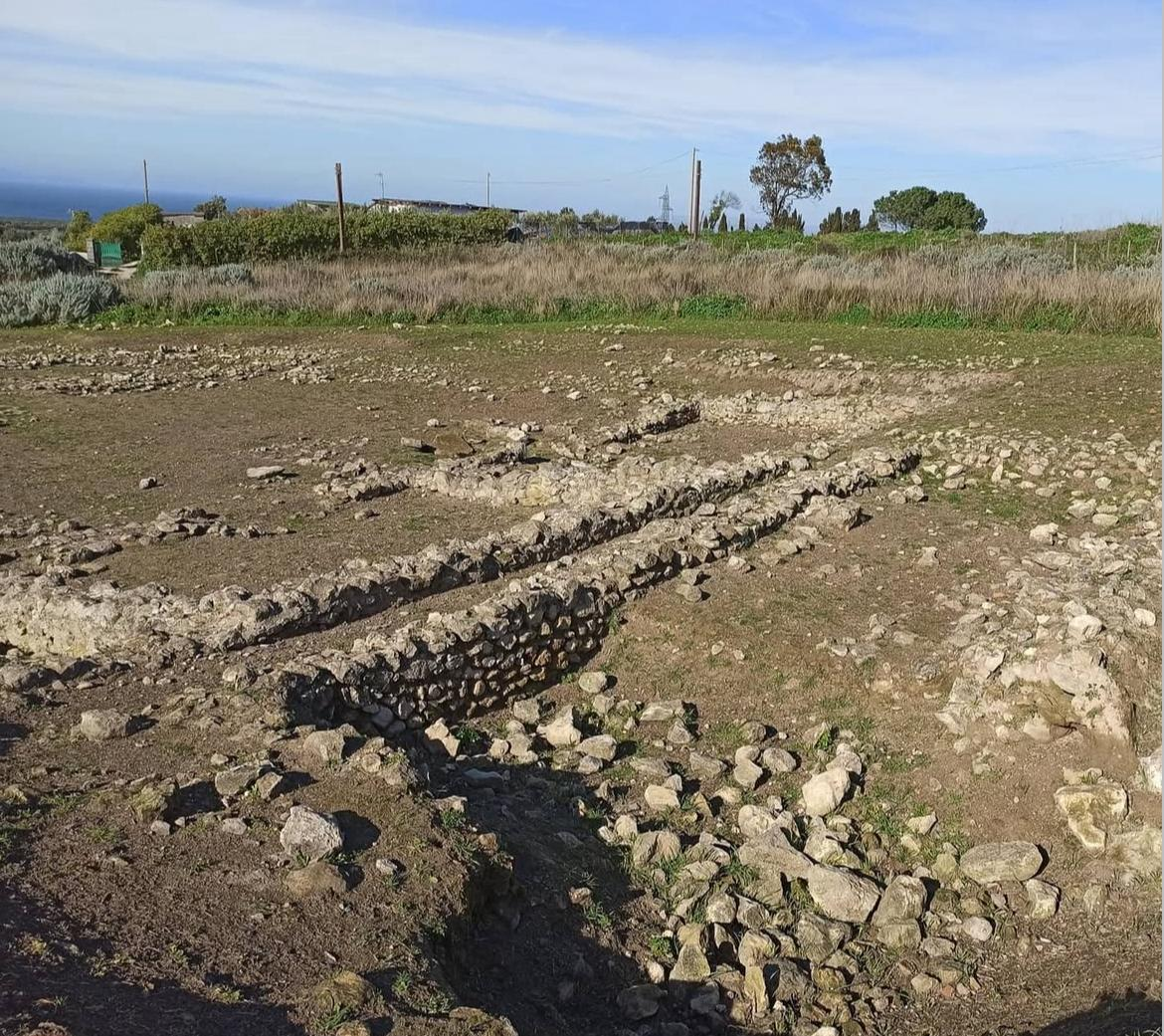
Stone remains of medieval domestic structures in the abandoned village of Geridu (Sorso, Sardinia).

=== Background and Research Objectives ===
Archaeological research on the medieval village of Geridu started in the mid-1990s and continued until the early 2000s, it was led by archaeologist Marco Milanese of the University of Sassari. This project aimed to study the history and structure of the archaeological site and to improve the understanding of abandoned settlements.

Studies were conducted by the Department of History of the University of Sassari; to complete the research, several disciplines from different university departments were involved, such as archaeology, history, botany and anthropology.

The investigations made it possible to:

- assess the stratigraphic potential of the area
- understand the organization of the village
- analyze the village's infrastructures
- study the daily life and the commercial activities of the population of the village.

=== Topography ===
The size of the archaeological site was estimated to be between 9 and 10 hectares, which was divided into several areas. One of the most important, known as Area 3000, spanned around 1,000 m², where fifteen buildings were identified. The houses in the village were mainly rectangular and ranged from 26 to 66 m². The inhabitants of the village built them using local limestone. The plaster was made of clay, and the roofs were covered with curved tiles supported by wooden beams. Corners, doorposts, and thresholds were built with squared stone blocks. Floors were made of rammed earth. In some rooms there were storage spaces for large Iberian jars used to contain water, oil, or grain.

The following table summarizes the main characteristics of the individual buildings inside the archaeological site:

Building	Excavation Area	Size & Layout	Wall Structure & Roof	Internal Features	Function/interpretation	Main Finds	Phases & Reuse
1	Area 3100 (northern sector)	ca. 43 m², rectangular	Double-faced limestone masonry with clay plaster; gabled roof with central wooden post	Two rooms: kitchen/living area with clay hearth and pantry (jars, carbonized grain); second room used as stable	Domestic dwelling (living space + animal shelter)	Carbonized grain, domestic tools, weapons	Abandoned suddenly after a fire
2	Area 3100, south of Building 1	30 m² → reduced to 20 m²	Double-faced limestone walls	Two hearths built with Silurian phyllite (refractory stones); no partitions	Workshop or production space (agricultural/pastoral processing)	“Alfonsino” coin of James II of Aragon (<1327), pottery, animal bones	Multiple reuse phases after partial collapse; water and refuse pits
3	Area 3100, south of building 2	Not defined	Limestone walls		Possible dwelling or annex		
4	Area 3500, central courtyard	ca. 6 × 11 m (≈66 m²), rectangular	Limestone walls, tiled gabled roof, central wooden post	Clay hearth, storage pit for grain and legumes, cooking ceramics	Domestic dwelling (cooking and storage functions)	Iron sickle, fava beans, coarse pottery	Roof collapse due to fire; later reuse as shelter
5	Area 3500, beside Building 4	ca. 7 × 2.5 m, narrow and elongated	Local limestone		Outdoor service or working space		
6	Northern side of courtyard / Area 3500	ca. 26 m², rectangular, entrance facing south	Limestone walls; later partition made of reused ashlar blocks from Area 4000	Built hearth near southern threshold	Dwelling later subdivided and reused		Several complex reuse phases within ruins
9		Rectangular, similar to Building 1	Stone walls; beaten earth floor; gabled roof with tiled porch	Clay hearth; gaming board engraved on threshold	Domestic dwelling	Coins of William III of Narbonne, Aragonese pottery, cups with coat of arms	Built mid-14th c.; reused during 15th c.
12	Northern side of courtyard	ca. 14 m²		Raised fireplace; traces of violent fire; weapon fragments	Dwelling	Ash, burned soil, weapons	Destroyed by violent fire
14	Extended Area 3000	ca. 14 × 5 m (≈70 m²)	Stone walls, internal reinforcements	Dark-brown fill, malacofaunal remains, leveled ground	Working area or animal shelter	Marine fauna remains	Reused after roof deterioration
4000 (Palace)	Area 4000	>20m long	Mortared masonry (rare at Geridu); same technique as village church	Secondary rooms with earthen walls, stone crawl space, brick gutters, slab of burnt clay; rock-cut basin (2.6 × 1.5 × 0.8 m) for rainwater	Elite residence or public building		Partial reuse (stone blocks reused in Building 6)

At least six of the buildings listed in the table faced a large courtyard, which appears to have been shared by several families and was used both for the storage of agricultural products and for daily social life.[19]

=== Necropolis and religious buildings ===
The village cemetery was located near the Church of Sant’Andrea. Around this church and outside the cemetery, numerous ossuaries have been documented; these contained human bones relocated from temporary earthen tombs.

The church (built around 1330 in the Catalan-Gothic style) and a large adjacent structure were constructed using techniques more refined than those employed for ordinary dwellings. Their walls consist of carefully selected stone blocks bound together with a high-quality lime mortar.

The elevated position of those structures and their excellent construction quality suggest that this area represented the religious and administrative center of Geridu.

=== Material finds ===
Numerous objects of everyday life were recovered from the site, including agricultural tools, ceramics, kitchen utensils, and fragments of rainwater collection systems. This findings attest to the rural character of the village.

Within the buildings, researchers found pots, pans, jugs, a wooden chest, tableware imported from the Iberian and Italian Peninsulas, and coins used in economic exchanges. Other finds include ceramics dating to the 11th and 12th century, imported from Sicily and Tunisia. The origin of these objects shows the village's involvement in Mediterranean trade.

=== Anthropological Research ===
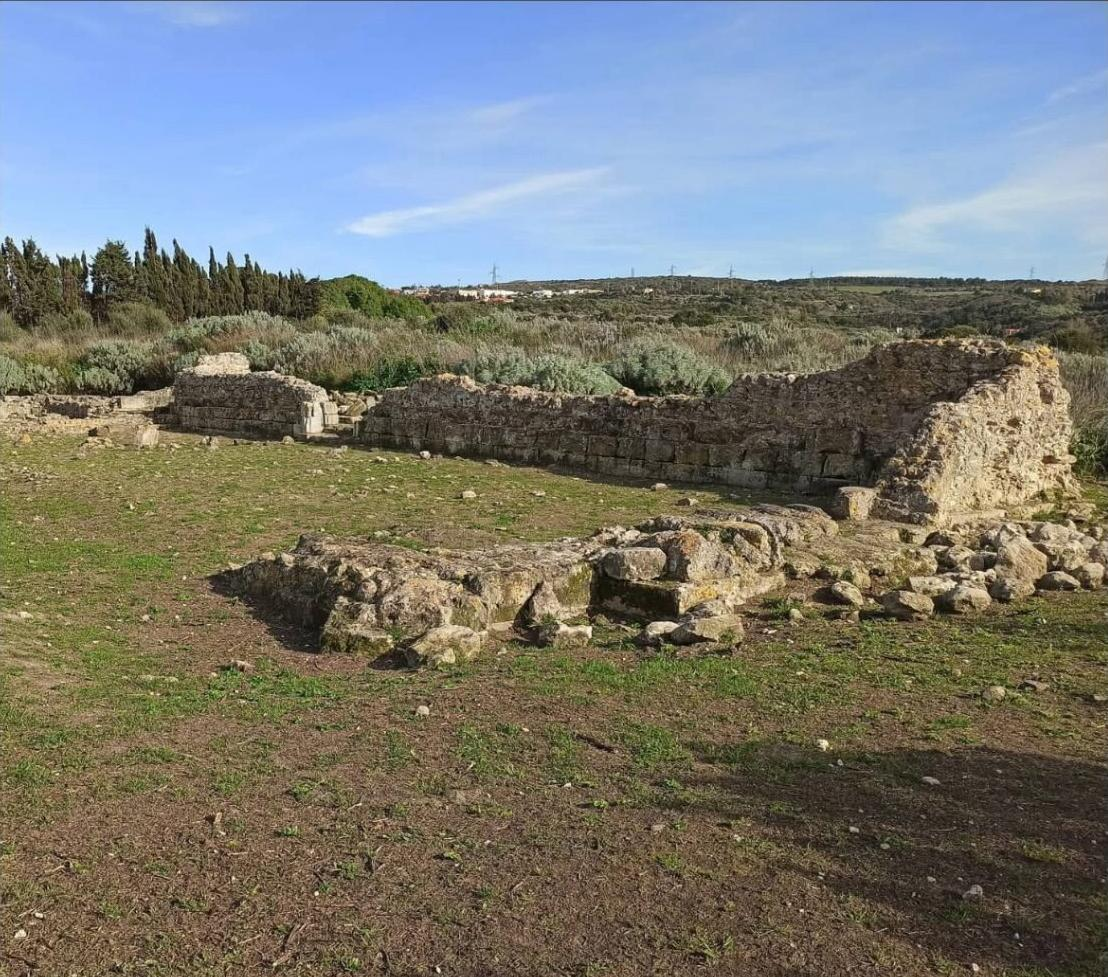
Stone remains of a medieval building in Geridu

The anthropological research conducted at Geridu aimed to reconstruct the population that inhabited the settlement during the Middle Age. The study was divided into three main sections: analysis of human remains, examination of the cemetery area and demographic research based on early modern parish registers.

- Analysis of Human Remains: the remains of 25 individuals were discovered. Infant remains were almost absent, while adults males were slightly more numerous.
- Cemetery Excavation: within the cemetery area, archeologists identified several phases of use and different burial types, including a large ossuary, individual burials in simple earthen graves and 25 pit graves dated between the late 13th and the first half of the 14th century. Among these was the skeleton of an adult female showing signs of congenital brachymetatarsia, believed to be the only case of its kind in paleopathology.
- Study of Parish Registers: research was also carried out on the quinque libri, the parish registers used to census the faithful. These documents began to be compiled at the end of the 16th century and the study focused in particular on the registers of Sorso, which begin in 1614.

== Botanical and Faunal Evidence ==
=== Botanical remains ===
Today, the vegetation around Geridu includes olive groves, other crops, holm oaks and remnants of mixed oak forests. The landscape around the village was similar also during the merieval period, but it probably experienced less human impact.

Archaeobotanical research had analyzed charred plant macroremains and about 1,000 fragments of burned wood. The main trees exploited were chestnut, deciduous oak, and hop hornbeam, which were probably used as construction timber; while Mediterranean species such as holm oak, cork oak, mastic, and heather were used as domestic fuel.

Researchers identified species not native to Sardinia, which were probably brought from the mainland; examples include fragments of silver fir and beech. Other plant remains, like charred vine shoots, fruit trees, cereals, legumes, willows, and reeds, show that the inhabitants of the village practiced extensive agriculture.

=== Faunal remains ===
The analysis of animal remains indicates that the village's economy was mainly based on livestock farming and agriculture. The main remains discovered were well-preserved bones, as well as terrestrial and marine mollusks.

The inhabitants mainly raised sheep and goats. The bones suggest multiple use of the animals: some individuals were destined for the production of meat, milk, and wool; other animals, such as cattle, were exploited for both heavy labor and meat production.

The discovery of marine shells and part of a gilt-head bream jaw suggests that the villagers often visited or traded with the coast.

== Biddas Museum ==
Findings from the medieval village of Geridu are preserved and exhibited at the Biddas Museum, a museum and a cultural space hosted in the Baronial Palace of Sorso. Directed by the archaeologist Marco Milanese, Biddas is the first museum in Italy dedicated to the theme of depopulation and the abandonment of settlements, with a particular focus on medieval villages in Sardinia.

The exhibition hall opens with contemporary images, such as the ghostly historic center of L’Aquila after the earthquake or the war-torn city of Beirut, introducing the issue of modern depopulation. The following rooms guide visitors through the phenomenon of depopulation across different historical periods. The medieval age is represented by Geridu, the first medieval village in Sardinia to be fully excavated . The museum stores several artifacts, pottery shards and human bones recovered during the excavations on the archaeological site in Geridu. Within Biddas, one of Geridu’s houses has been reconstructed, offering visitors a clearer understanding of everyday life in the village.

One of the main characteristics of Biddas is the immersive and sensorial experience it offers to visitors. In fact, the flooring in each room corresponds to the historical period represented, while visitors can tough selected artifacts, take photos and copy information. Thanks to this approach, in 2013 the museum received the Francovich Award, from the Italian Society of Medieval Archaeologists (SAMI), for its ability to combine innovation and tradition through modern communication.

The museum’s broader goal is to raise awareness of the need to protect Sardinia’s abandoned villages and to emphasize the importance of territorial planning in preserving this cultural heritage.

== Gallery ==
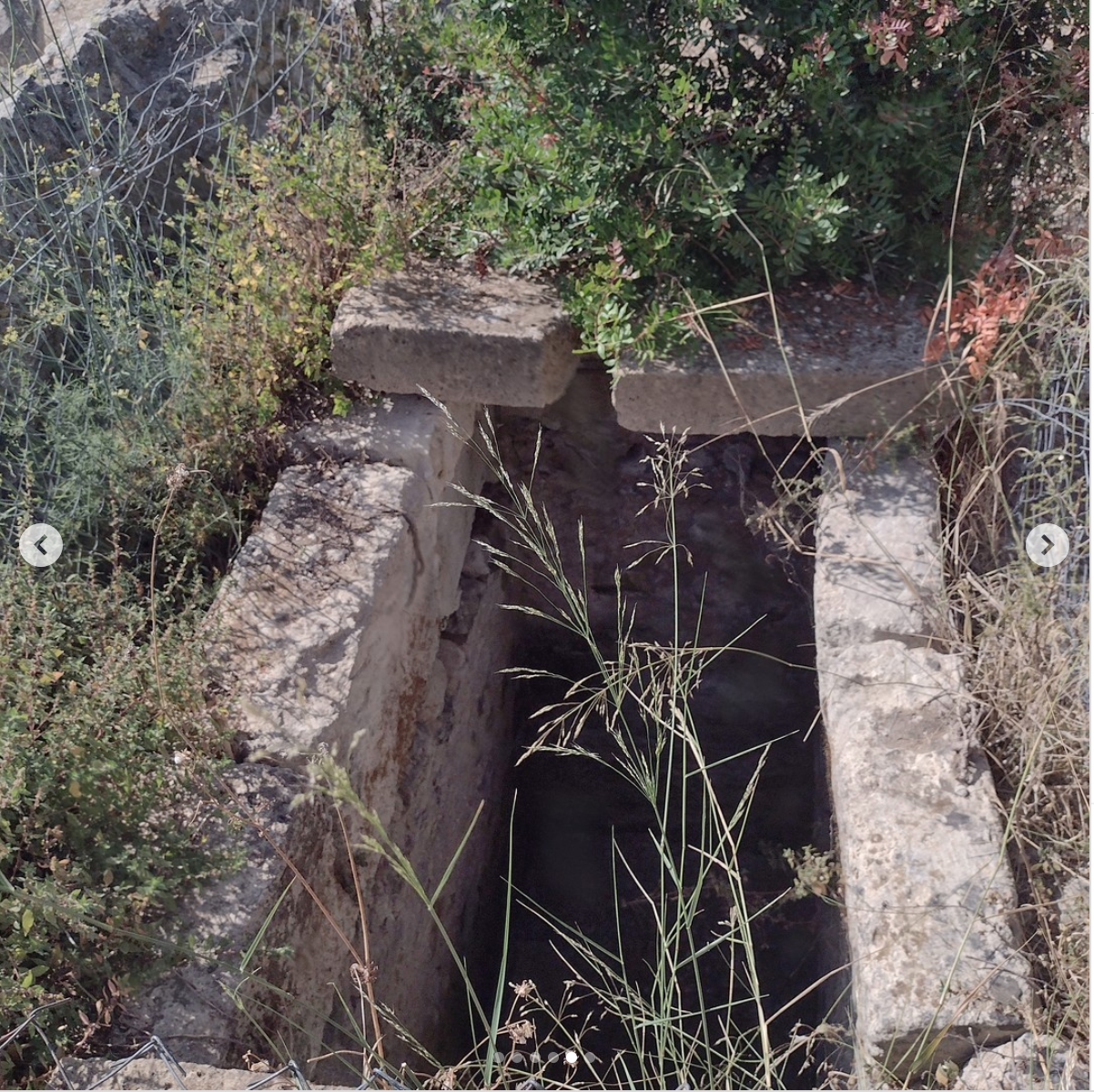
Stone archaeological structure at the medieval village of Geridu

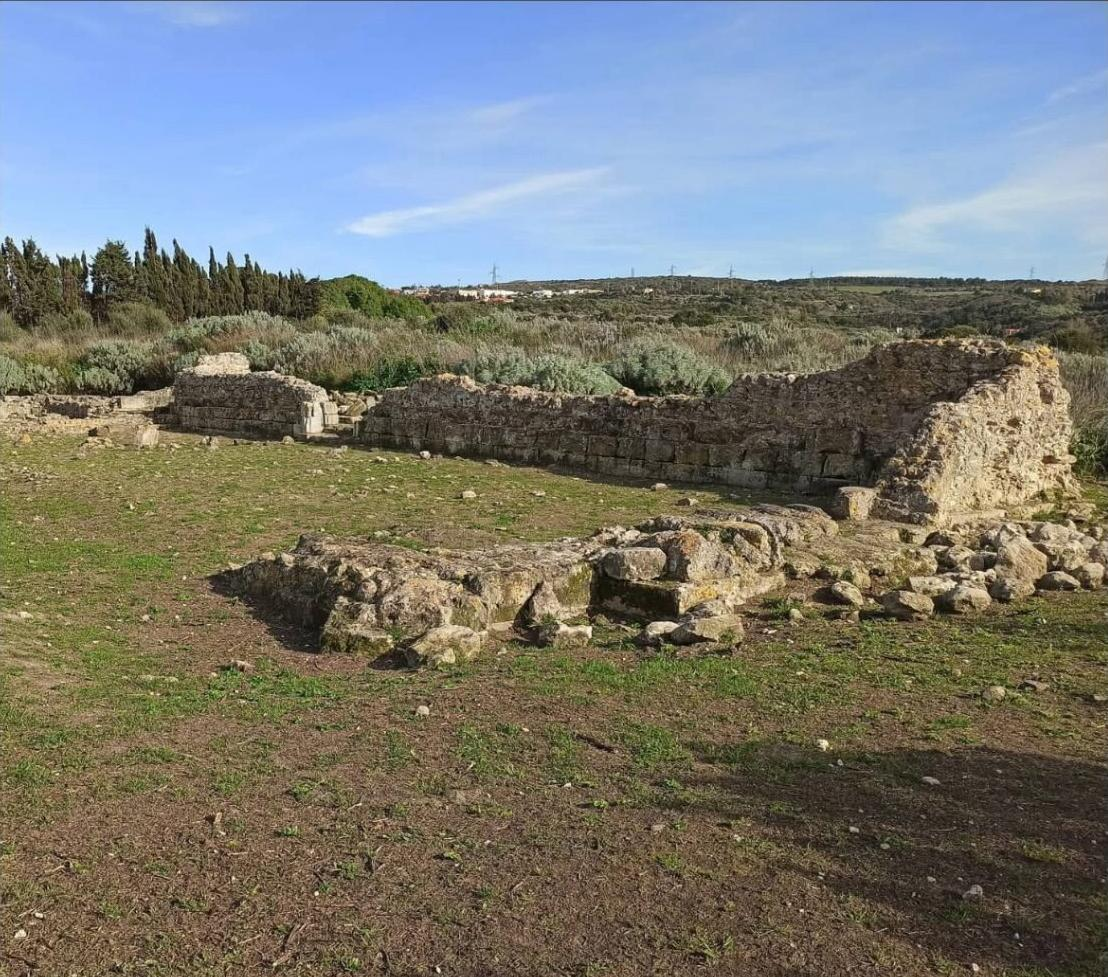
Stone remains of a medieval building at Geridu

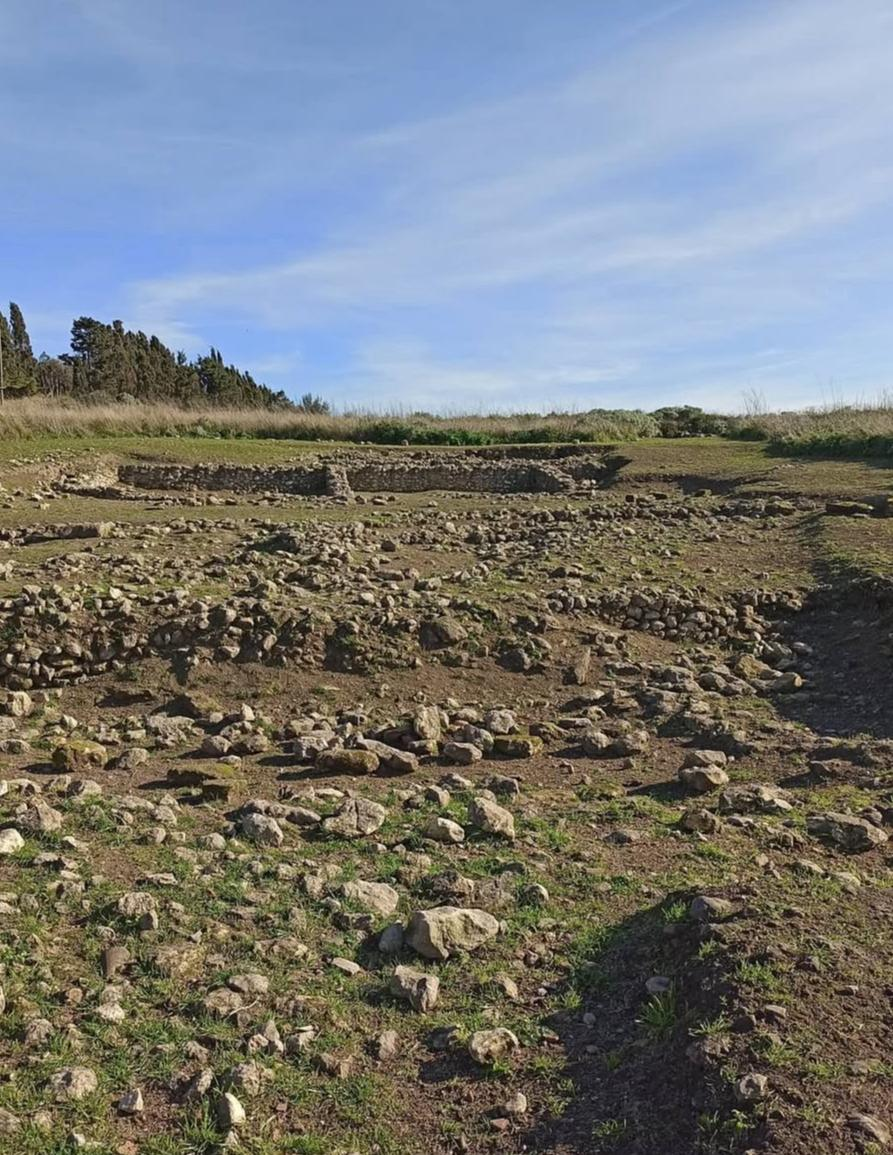
General view of the archaeological site of Geridu

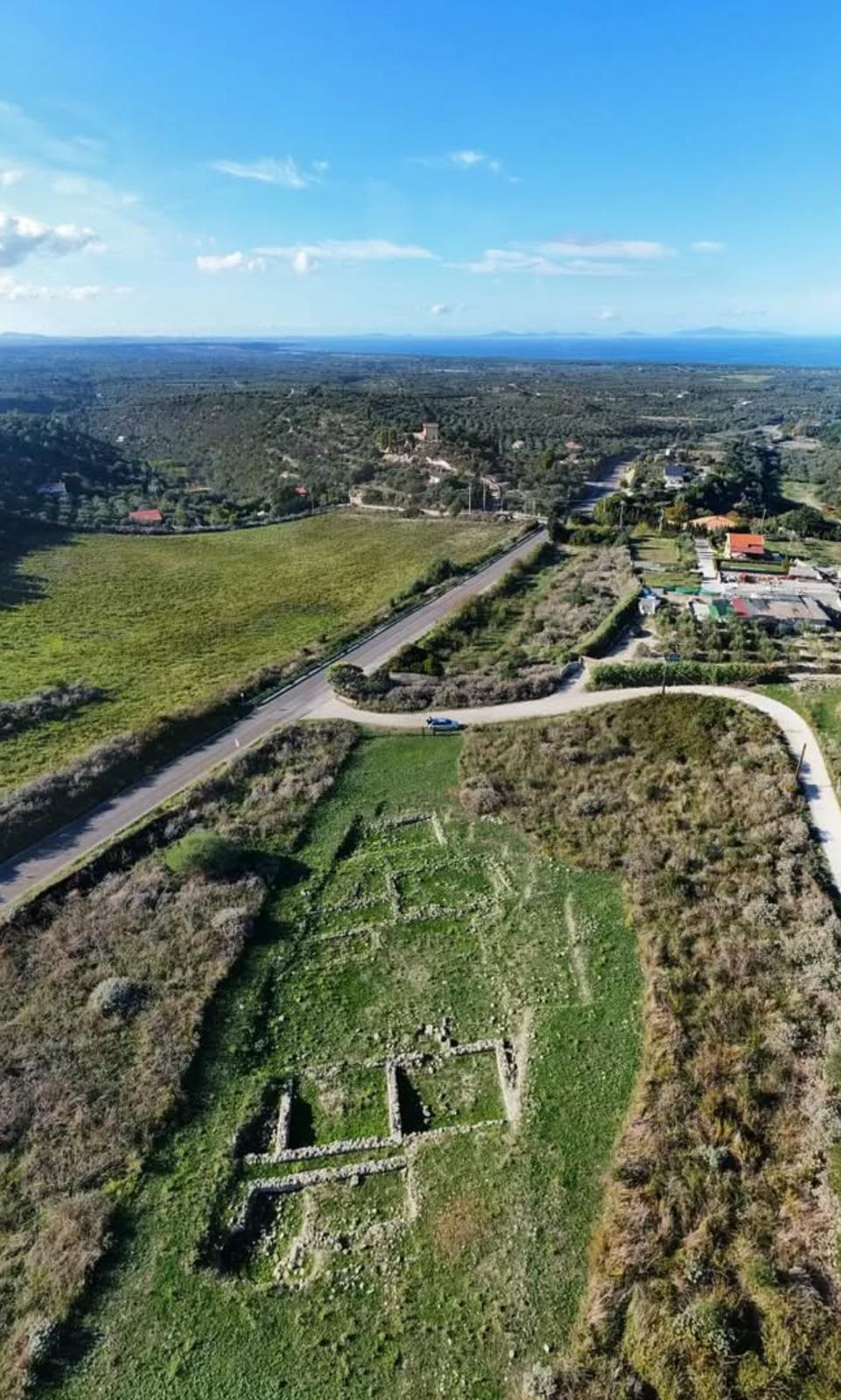
Aerial view of medieval village of Geridu, Sorso

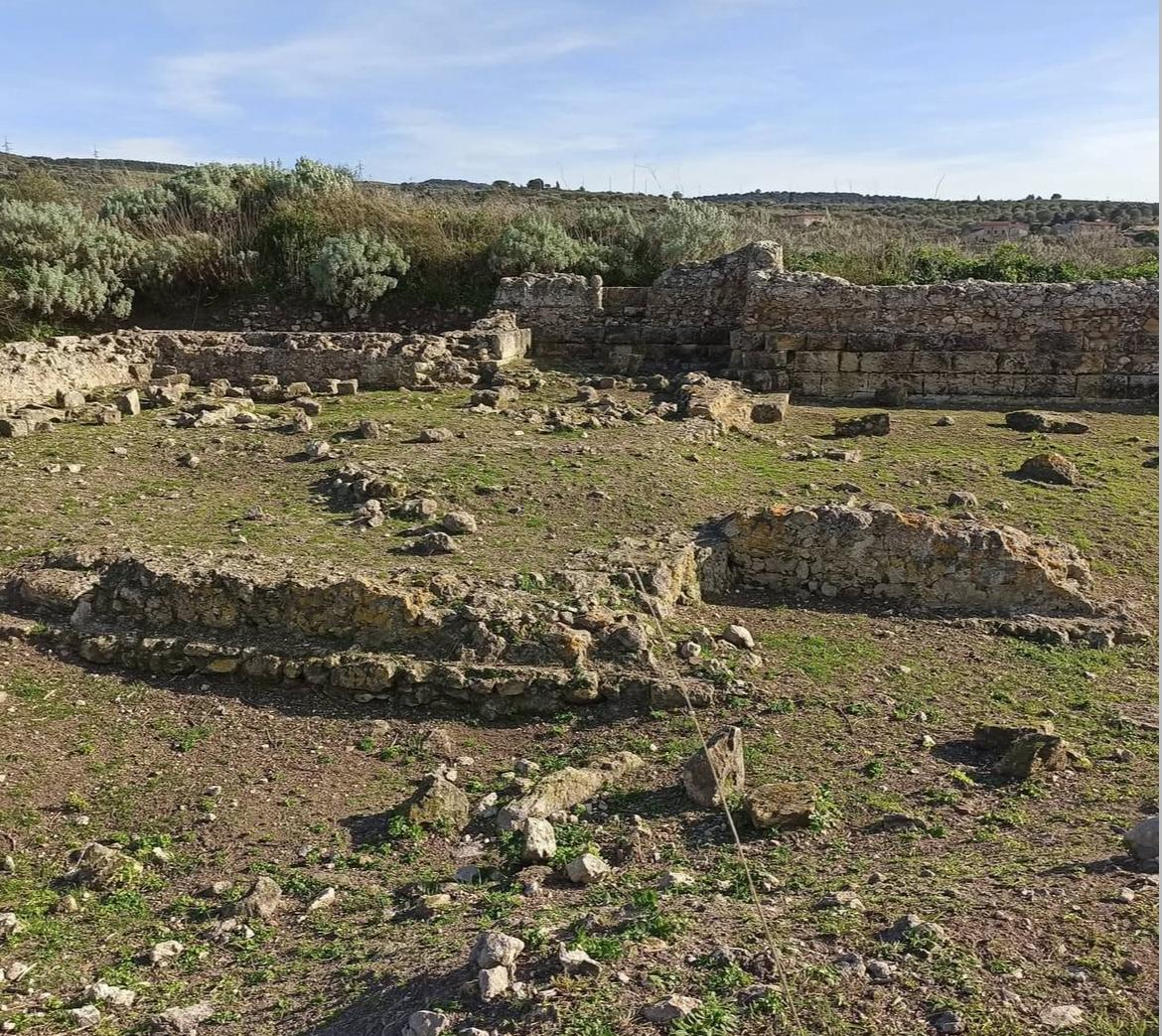
Stone remains of medieval domestic structures in the abandoned village of Geridu

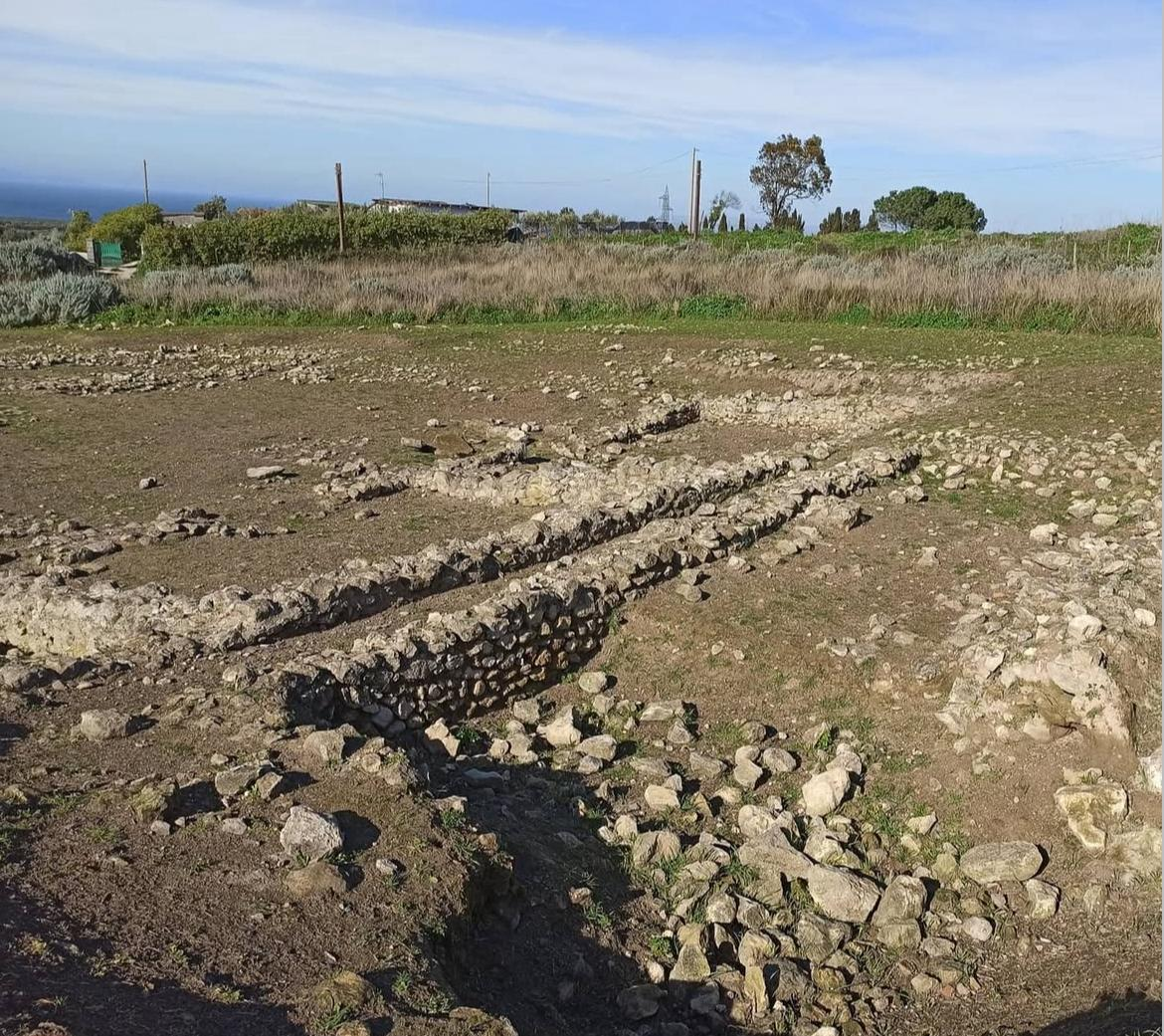
Stone remains of medieval domestic structures in the abandoned village of Geridu

== See also ==
- Medieval archaeology
- List of archaeological sites in Italy
- Judicate of Logudoro
- History of Sardinia
- Italy in the Middle Ages
- Hundatorra
- History of Sardinia
- National Archaeological Museum, Cagliari
- National Archaeological Museum, Naples
- National Archaeological Museum, Florence
