= Walter Edward Mills =

English architect

Walter Mills
- Born: 7 November 1850; St Luke's, London
- Died: 17 April 1910 (aged 59); Headington, Oxfordshire
- Occupation: Architect
- Projects: Holdenby House

Walter Edward Mills (7 November 1850 – 17 April 1910) was an English architect.

Mills was articled to the architect Henry Edward Cooper of Bloomsbury in 1868. He established his own independent practice in Banbury, Oxfordshire in about 1875, where by 1881 he had premises at 13, High Street.

Mills served as architectural clerk to the agent for the Clifden Estates, for whom he completed Holdenby House in 1878. Mills designed a number of public buildings in mixed styles, usually neo-Jacobean. His extension of the Oxford Union was completed posthumously.

Mills was elected an Associate of the Royal Institute of British Architects (ARIBA) in 1882.

== Works ==
- Holdenby House, Holdenby, Northamptonshire: extension, 1877-78
- St. Leonard's parish church, Grimsbury, Oxfordshire, 1890
- St. Mary's parish church, Holwell, Oxfordshire: rebuilding, 1895
- St. James' parish church, Sarsden, Oxfordshire: north transept and bellcote, 1896
- Warwick Road Hospital, Banbury, Oxfordshire: hospital wing, late 19th century
- Bovey Castle, Devon - manor house for Frederick Smith, 2nd Viscount Hambleden, 1907-8
- St Hilda's College, Oxford: extension, 1909
- Oxford Union, Oxford: second library, 1910-11 (with Thorpe)

== Sources ==
- Brodie, Antonia; Felstead, Alison; Franklin, Jonathan; Pinfield, Leslie; Oldfield, Jane, eds. (2001). Directory of British Architects 1834–1914, L–Z. London & New York: Continuum. pp. 184–185. ISBN 0-8264-5514-X.
- Pevsner, Nikolaus; Cherry, Bridget (1973) [1961]. Northamptonshire. The Buildings of England. Harmondsworth: Penguin Books. p. 263. ISBN 0-14-071022-1.
- Sherwood, Jennifer; Pevsner, Nikolaus (1974). Oxfordshire. The Buildings of England. Harmondsworth: Penguin Books. pp. 245, 273, 404, 438, 444, 650, 752. ISBN 0-14-071045-0.
