= Sarsden =

Village in Oxfordshire, England

Coordinates: 51.910°N 1.579°W

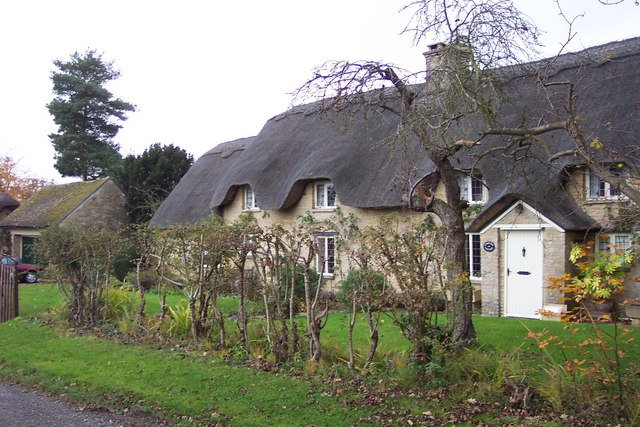
- Thatched cottages at Sarsden

- Location within Oxfordshire
- Population: 64 (Parish, 2021)
- OS grid reference: SP2923
- Civil parish: Sarsden
- District: West Oxfordshire
- Shire county: Oxfordshire
- Region: South East
- Country: England
- Sovereign state: United Kingdom
- Post town: Chipping Norton
- Postcode district: OX7
- Police: Thames Valley
- Fire: Oxfordshire
- Ambulance: South Central
- UK Parliament: Banbury
- Website: Churchill and Sarsden

Sarsden is a village and civil parish in the West Oxfordshire district of Oxfordshire, England. It lies about 3 miles (5 km) south of Chipping Norton. At the 2021 census the parish had a population of 64. Since 1976 the parish has shared a grouped parish council with the neighbouring parish of Churchill.

== Notable buildings ==
Sarsden House is a country house, rebuilt in 1689 after it was damaged by fire. In 1795 Humphry Repton landscaped the park, adding a serpentine lake and a Doric temple. In about 1825 Repton's son, the architect G.S. Repton, remodelled the house for James Langston. The house is a Grade II* listed building. The Church of England parish church of Saint James was rebuilt in 1760. GS Repton added a cruciform extension to the east in 1823. In 1896 the architect Walter Mills of Banbury remodelled the north transept and added the bellcote. Sarsgrove House, or the Dower House, is 1 1/2 miles (2.4 km) northeast of Sarsden. G.S. Repton remodelled it as a large cottage orné in 1825.

== Governance ==
There are three tiers of local government covering Sarsden, at parish, district and county level: Churchill and Sarsden Parish Council, West Oxfordshire District Council, and Oxfordshire County Council. The parish council is a grouped parish council, set up in 1976 to cover both Sarsden and the neighbouring parish of Churchill.

== Sources and further reading ==
- Ekwall, Eilert (1960) [1936]. Concise Oxford Dictionary of English Place-Names (4th ed.). Oxford: Oxford University Press. Sarsden. ISBN 0198691033.
- Sherwood, Jennifer; Pevsner, Nikolaus (1974). Oxfordshire. The Buildings of England. Harmondsworth: Penguin Books. pp. 752–753. ISBN 0-14-071045-0.
