= Bovey Castle =

20th-century mansion in Devon, England

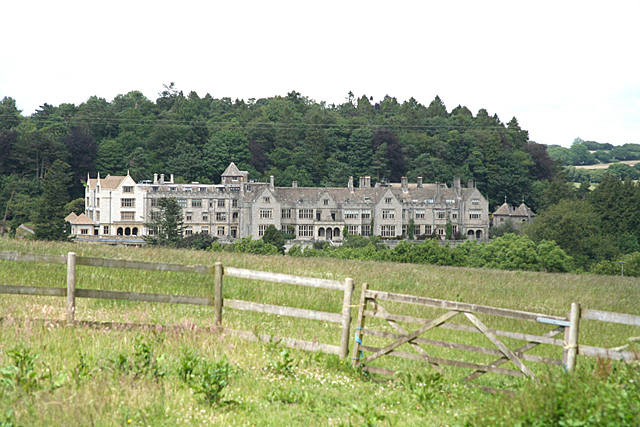
- Interactive map of the Bovey Castle area
- Hotel chain: Eden Hotel Collection

General information
- Type: English country house
- Architectural style: Neo-Jacobean
- Location: Moretonhampstead, Devon, England
- Coordinates: 50.646092°N 3.795516°W
- Completed: 1908
- Client: Frederick Smith
- Owner: Rigby Group

Design and construction
- Architects: Walter Edward Mills

Listed Building – Grade II*
- Official name: Manor House Hotel, including terraces immediately to south-east
- Designated: 16 January 1981
- Reference no.: 1097161

Other information
- Number of rooms: 59
- Number of restaurants: 2
- Number of bars: 1
- Interactive map of Bovey Castle

Restaurant information
- Rating: 5 red stars (The AA)

Bovey Castle, formerly the Manor House Hotel, is a large early 20th-century mansion on the edge of Dartmoor National Park, near Moretonhampstead, Devon, England. It is a Grade II* listed building and is now a hotel with 59 individually designed bedrooms in the hotel and 22 three-storey country lodges nearby.

== History ==
=== Construction ===
The house started construction in 1907 for Frederick Smith, Lord Hambleden, the son and heir of the Conservative politician and stationery magnate William Henry Smith. Contemporary news reporting and a plaque within the building note the architect as Walter Edward Mills, although the official listing lists the architect as Detmar Blow, and Pevsner attributed it to Thomas Garner.

The building is built of granite quarried within the wider estate, with dressings of stone from Darley Dale in Derbyshire. Over 300 people worked on the construction of the building, and the completion was celebrated with a grand dinner for them in March 1908.

=== Wartime service ===
In 1917, due to World War I, the manor house was opened for the use of wounded soldiers.

=== Conversion to a hotel ===
Following the death of Lord Hambleden, there were significant death duties to be paid, and the estate was sold off by lots at auction in 1928, along with over 5,000 acres of land and the entire village of North Bovey. The following year, it was announced that the main manor house and 200 acres of land had been sold to the Great Western Railway for conversion into a hotel. The provision of activities including fishing, croquet, and the possibility of the construction of a golf course on site were emphasised from the announcement.

The hotel opened in 1929 as the "Manor House Hotel". The following year, on Whitsun 1930, the new 18-hole golf course opened at the hotel, designed by John Frederick Abercromby. The following year, a group of noted golf professionals played at the Manor House Hotel course, at the invitation of Viscount Churchill, chairman of the Great Western Railway.

The nationalisation of the railways in 1948 led to the hotel being part of the British Transport Commission's Hotels Executive, which eventually became the British Transport Hotels portfolio.

=== Privatisation ===
Privatisation of British Rail, including the hotel portfolio, saw the property sold into the private sector in 1983. It was initially sold with seven other British Transport Hotels to the Virani brothers, but was re-sold within 48 hours to Eclipsecare.

Eclipsecare maintained ownership of the hotel under its Crown Hotels group until 1991 when the group went into receivership. The hotel continued to trade, and do good business, whilst the parent company was in administration.

=== Expansion and name change ===
Entrepreneur Peter de Savary, also then the owner of Skibo Castle, purchased the Manor House Hotel in 2003 for £7.5 million. The hotel continued to trade during 2003, and was closed in early 2004 for a full refurbishment.

de Savary undertook extensive renovation and extension of the property, rebranding the hotel as Bovey Castle. The expansion included the building of a new wing on the main building, containing a swimming pool and new brasserie restaurant, as well as the building of 22 lodges in the grounds.

In 2006 de Savary sold Bovey Castle to Hilwood Resorts for over £26m. Hilwood put the hotel up for sale for £17.5m in 2012, and was eventually sold in 2015 to the Rigby Group, forming part of their Eden Hotel Collection.

The castle was used as the venue for the wedding of diver Tom Daley to film director Dustin Lance Black, in May 2017.

== Recognition ==
Bovey Castle is rated as 5 star, and an "Inspector's Choice Hotel" by The AA, as well as having 3 rosettes for the main restaurant and 1 for the brasserie. The Eden Hotel Collection which it is part of was named Small Hotel Group of the Year in the 2024 AA Hospitality Awards.

The hotel was named as Large Hotel of the Year at the South West Tourism Awards in 2024, following a win at the Devon Tourism Awards.

== Architecture ==
The main building was built in 1907 in Jacobean style, with a Great Hall into which a floor was inserted in the 1980s. The interior is of high quality, with panelled rooms and elaborately carved features. Extensions were built in the 1930s. The garden front is set above terraces overlooking a lake and the River Bovey.

== Incidents ==
In September 2016, 13 people were injured when a balcony collapsed at the hotel.
