= Ivo Stern Becka =

Mexican scouting leader

Chairman of the Asociación de Scouts de México, A.C.

Ivo Stern Becka served as the Chairman of the Asociación de Scouts de México, A.C., the Chairman of the Interamerican Scout Committee, and a member of the World Scout Committee.

In 2000, he was awarded the 282nd Bronze Wolf, the only distinction of the World Organization of the Scout Movement, awarded by the World Scout Committee for exceptional services to world Scouting, at the 25th World Scout Conference.
