= Marek Bečka =

Czech puppeteer

Marek Bečka is the founder of Buchty a Loutky puppet company ("Cakes and Puppets") and lecturer in puppetry at Department of Alternative and Puppet Theatre of the Theatre Faculty of Academy of Performing Arts in Prague, Czech Republic.

== Artistic contribution ==
Bečka is a lecturer in puppetry who has been invited to give master classes in Hong Kong and the Netherlands. Bečka is a graduate of the Prague Academy of Performing Arts in Puppetry. He is also a skilled director and writer. His vision has seen the founding of Buchty a Loutky ("Cakes and Puppets") puppet company in 1991, which has presented over many years a great range of offerings including Rocky IX and Tibet. Buchty a Loutky is famous all over Europe through its tours.

== Books and articles ==
- Dubská, Alice; Jan Novák; Nina Malíková; Marie Zdeňková (2006). Czech Puppet Theatre Yesterday and Today. Prague: Theatre Institute. ISBN 80-7008-199-6.
