= North Bovey =

Village and civil parish in Devon, England

Coordinates: 50°38′N 3°47′W

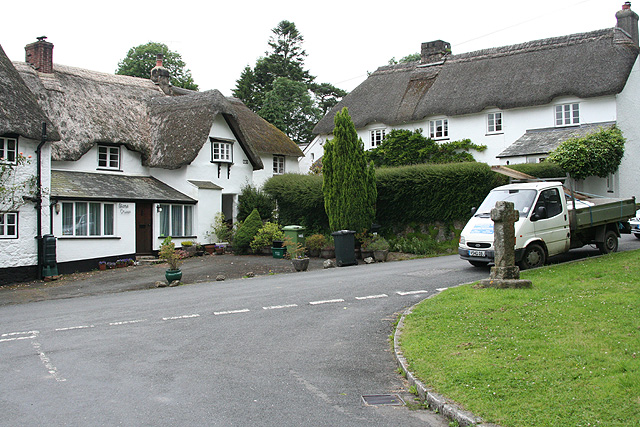
- The village green at North Bovey showing thatched cottages and the stone cross

- Location within Devon
- Population: 274 (2001 census)
- OS grid reference: SX739839
- Civil parish: North Bovey
- District: Teignbridge
- Shire county: Devon
- Region: South West
- Country: England
- Sovereign state: United Kingdom

North Bovey is a village and civil parish situated on the south-eastern side of Dartmoor National Park, Teignbridge, Devon, England, about 11 miles WSW of the city of Exeter and 1.5 miles SSW of Moretonhampstead. The village lies above the eastern bank of the River Bovey from which it takes its name. In 2001 the population of the parish was 274, compared to 418 in 1901 and 519 in 1801.

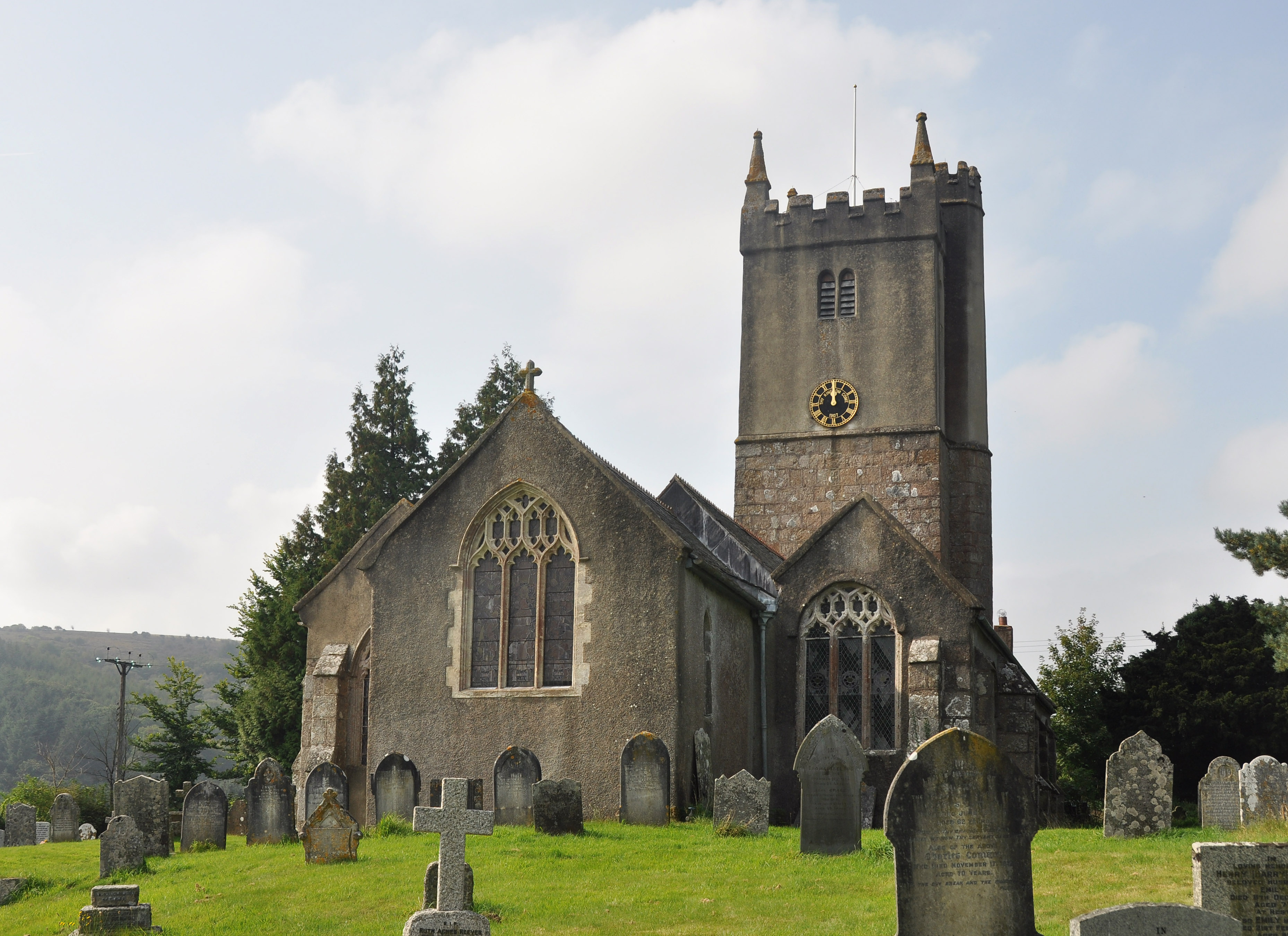
The parish church

The parish church is built of granite and is dedicated to St. John the Baptist. It dates from the 13th century, and was restored early in the 20th century by Sir Charles Nicholson. It is one of the several churches around Dartmoor that has a representation of the tinners rabbits on one of its roof bosses.

On the village green is an ancient stone cross which was thrown down during the Civil War and spent some time afterwards as a bridge over a local stream. In 1829 it was retrieved and installed into a socket-stone which had remained in situ on the village green, though it is not considered likely that it is the original cross that was mounted here as it appears to be older than the base.

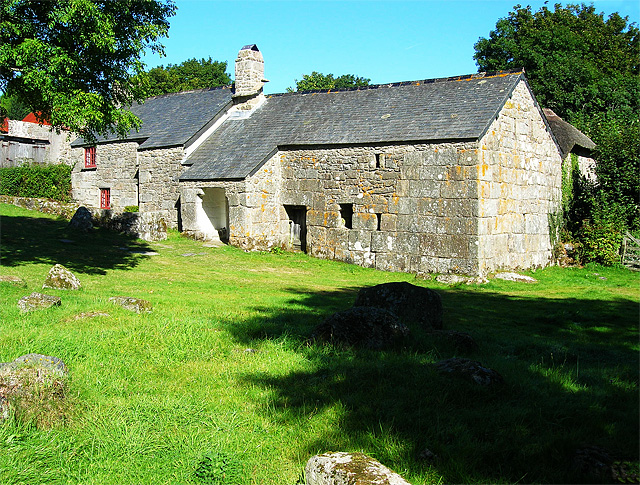
Sanders, a fine 16th-century longhouse at Lettaford

The parish encompasses part of the eastern side of Dartmoor, an area rich in Bronze Age remains such as Grimspound, right on its boundary. The medieval Bennett's Cross, on the road between Moretonhampstead and Two Bridges is one of the markers of the parish boundary, and the Birch Tor and Vitifer tin mining area is nearby. In the north of the parish, the small settlements of Beeson and Shapley were mentioned in the Domesday Book. There are several preserved Dartmoor longhouses in the parish, notably at Lettaford and Westcombe.

Also within the parish is Bovey Castle, designed by Detmar Blow and built in 1905–7 for Viscount Hambledon, son of W. H. Smith, the newsagent. It is now a grade II* listed building and a hotel with an 18-hole championship golf course.

== Church history ==
The Rev. William Henry Thornton was rector of North Bovey for fifty years. He was the author of Reminiscences and Reflections of an Old West-country Clergyman; Torquay, 1897 & 1899.
