= Hundatorra =

- Deserted medieval village
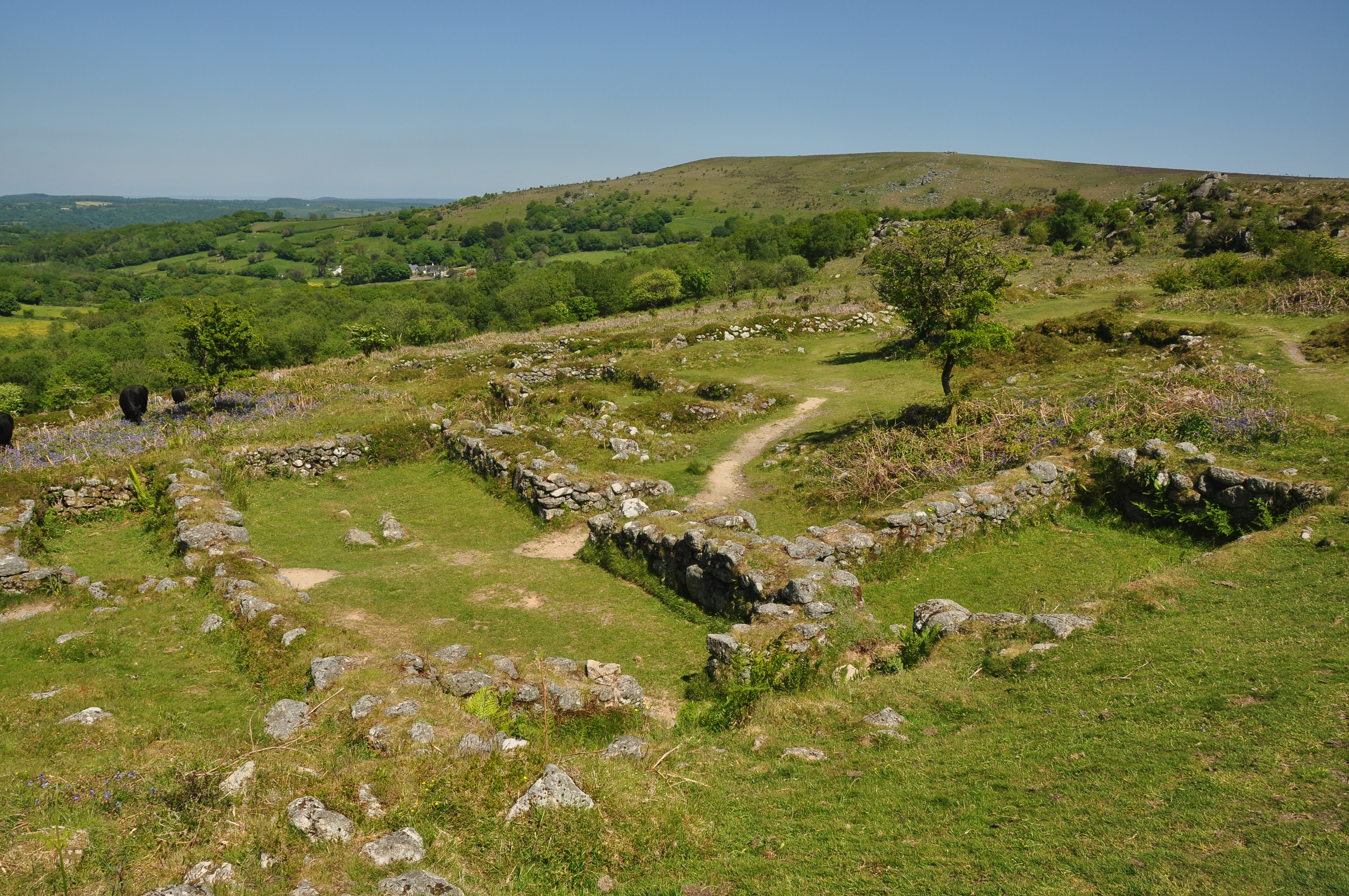
- The remains of the medieval village

- Hundatorra shown within Dartmoor
- Coordinates: 50.595187°N 3.772509°W
- Ordnance Survey: Map sources for Hundatorra
- Country: England
- County: Devon
- Website: www.english-heritage.org.uk/visit/places/hound-tor-deserted-medieval-village

Hundatorra or Hundetorre is a deserted medieval village near Hound Tor on Dartmoor, Devon, England. The site has seen two periods of historic occupation, the first in the Bronze Age from around 1700 – 1200 BCE and deserted by 1000 BCE, and the reoccupation during the Medieval Warm Period until approximately the 14th century.

== Site ==
The village site is around 1,100 feet (340 m) above sea level, and on a North East-facing slope.

== History ==
=== Prehistory ===
The site was occupied in the Bronze Age, around 1700 – 1200 BCE (compared to the more famous Grimspound which dates later - from between 1500 and 800 BCE), and traces of these pre-historic circular stone huts still remain. The buildings consist of at least eight huts and two enclosures.

A prolonged period of global cooling meant that the village was no longer suitable for year-round occupation, and by 1000 BCE all residents had likely left, just using the land for summer pasture.

=== Medieval reoccupation ===
From around 950 CE there was a regional warming of temperatures, known as the Medieval Warm Period, with average temperatures becoming roughly similar to those of the mid-20th century for Dartmoor. This warming made it viable to grow crops and to live on the moor again.

By the time of the Domesday Book there was sufficient population to be noted as Hundetorra, under the control of the Abbot of Tavistock. The assayed complement of this area was 2 virgates (approximately 60 acres (24 hectares)), 2 villeins, 4 bordars, 2 serfs, 7 oxen, 28 sheep, 18 goats, 2 acres (0.81 hectares) woodland, 9 acres of meadow and 1 league of pasture.

This may well have been the farm below Houndtor (great and little houndtor seen on the tithe maps and Greator farm) and the surrounding settlements instead, due to the older nature of the field patterns (post Roman) across that land.

=== Farming hamlet ===
By around 1200 CE, a permanent village was constructed and the lord of the manor was recorded as being Richard de Hundetorra. By 1242, his son, also named Richard, had taken over and there were around 20–30 villagers farming around 10 acres (4.0 hectares) of land with terraced strips of arable planting.

The village consisted of 11 stone buildings, probably split into three distinct farms, with another farm about 250m to the north of the village. Each of the four farmsteads has a Dartmoor longhouse, with the largest nearly 19 metres (62 ft) long, all made of local granite. It is thought that each would have had roughly 2 metres (6.6 ft) high walls, with thatched roofs on timber beams.

=== Decline and abandonment ===
The three grain storage barns appear to have been adapted to include corn dryers, possibly indicative of a deteriorating climate.

1315 saw the start of three years of abnormally high rainfall, leading to widespread crop failures as well as the inability to evaporate brine for salt, meaning that meat preservation was not possible, and this caused the Great Famine of 1315–1317. Outlying marginally viable settlements like Hundatorra were particularly badly affected, and effects may have been compounded by the Great Bovine Pestilence which came in 1319–20, killing nearly two-thirds of all bovine animals (cows and oxen) in England, affecting meat, dairy, and also arable because of the reliance on oxen as ploughing animals.

The late 1340s saw the spread of the Black Death, killing half the population of England.

Pollen evidence indicates that farming had stopped at Hundatorra by 1350, but recent analysis of pottery suggests that the village was probably occupied until the late 14th or early 15th century.

The villagers apparently left little behind when they left, though the acidic soil would have destroyed much evidence; the excavations unearthed a single coin from the time of Henry III, and some broken pottery originating from Crockerton in Wiltshire.

== Status ==
The site, including both the prehistoric and medieval settlements, is listed as a scheduled monument.

The medieval village is managed by Dartmoor National Park Authority.
