= Hound Tor =

Granite tor on Dartmoor in Devon, England

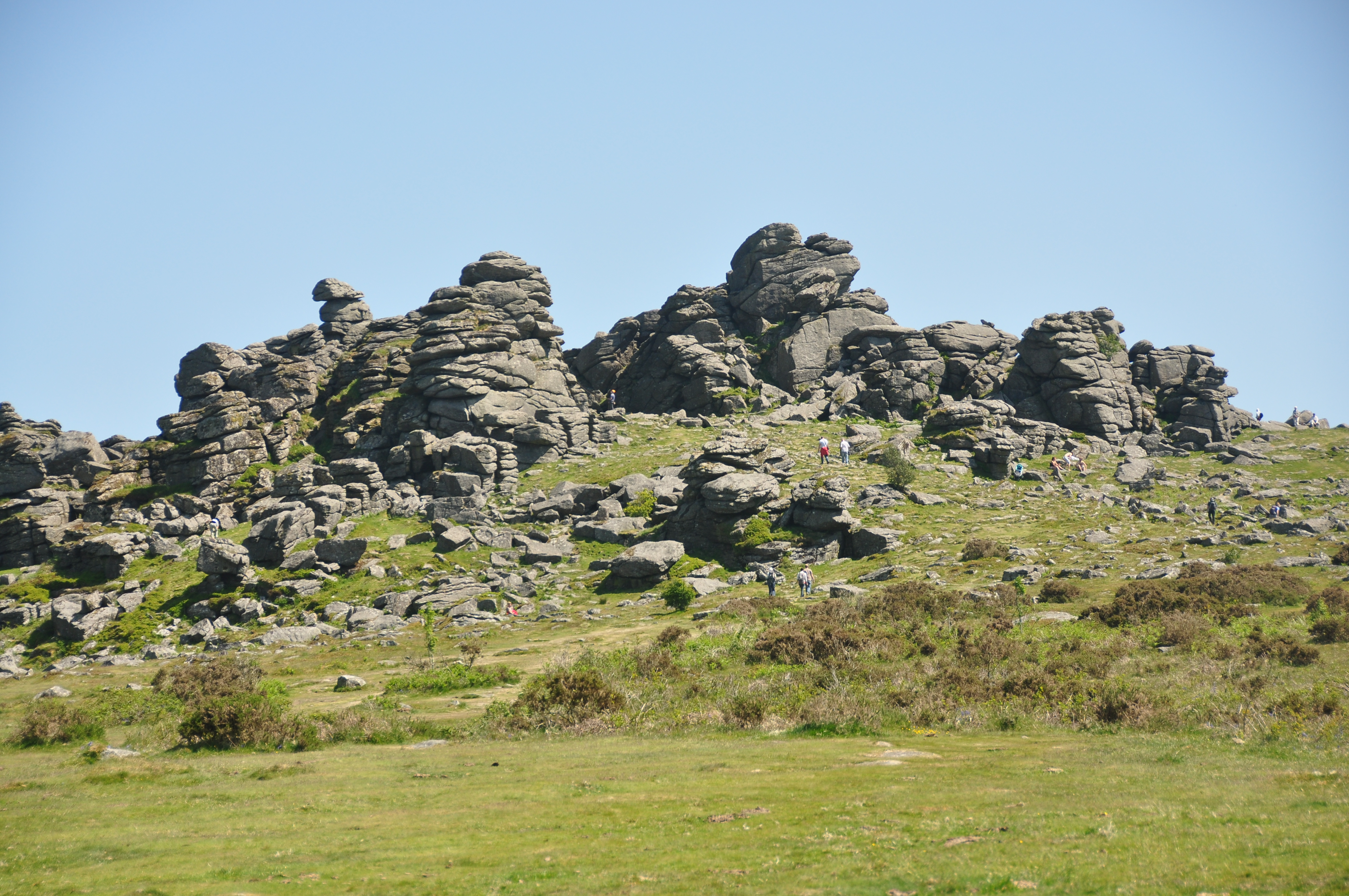
- View of Hound Tor

Highest point
- Elevation: 414 m (1,358 ft)
- Prominence: c. 26 m
- Coordinates: 50°35′46″N 3°46′44″W

Geography
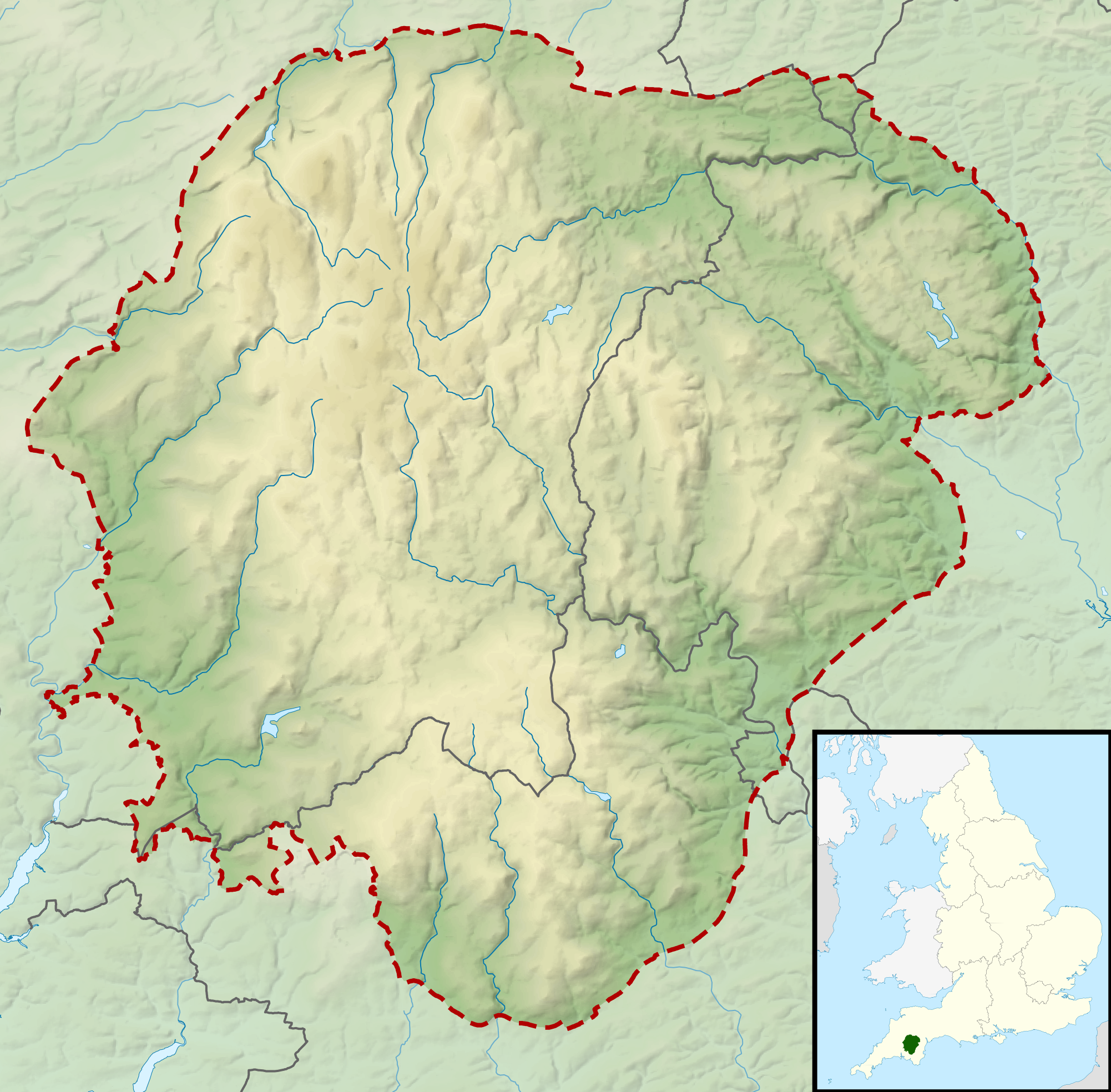
- Location within Dartmoor
- Location: Dartmoor, England
- OS grid: SX742789
- Topo map: OS Landranger 191

Hound Tor is a tor on Dartmoor, Devon, England and is a good example of a heavily weathered granite outcrop. It is easily accessible, situated within a few minutes from the B3387 between Bovey Tracey and Widecombe-in-the-Moor.

The site is administered by Dartmoor National Park Authority for English Heritage as it includes the ruins of a medieval village, alongside prehistoric works of stone construction nearby.

== Etymology ==
Sabine Baring-Gould said that the tor derived its name from the shape assumed by the blocks on the summit that have been weathered into forms resembling the heads of dogs peering over the natural battlements.

== Medieval village ==
To the southeast of the tor, on a northeast-facing slope are the remains of Hundatorra, a deserted medieval village. This was built on land farmed originally in the Bronze Age and which may have been used for grazing in the Roman period. The village was excavated between 1961 and 1975. It has four Dartmoor longhouses, many with a central drainage channel, and several smaller houses and barns. These buildings date from the 13th century. The three grain storage barns appear to have been adapted to include corn dryers, indicative of the deteriorating climate. Pollen evidence indicates that farming had stopped by 1350, but recent analysis of pottery suggests that the village was probably occupied until the late 14th or early 15th century.

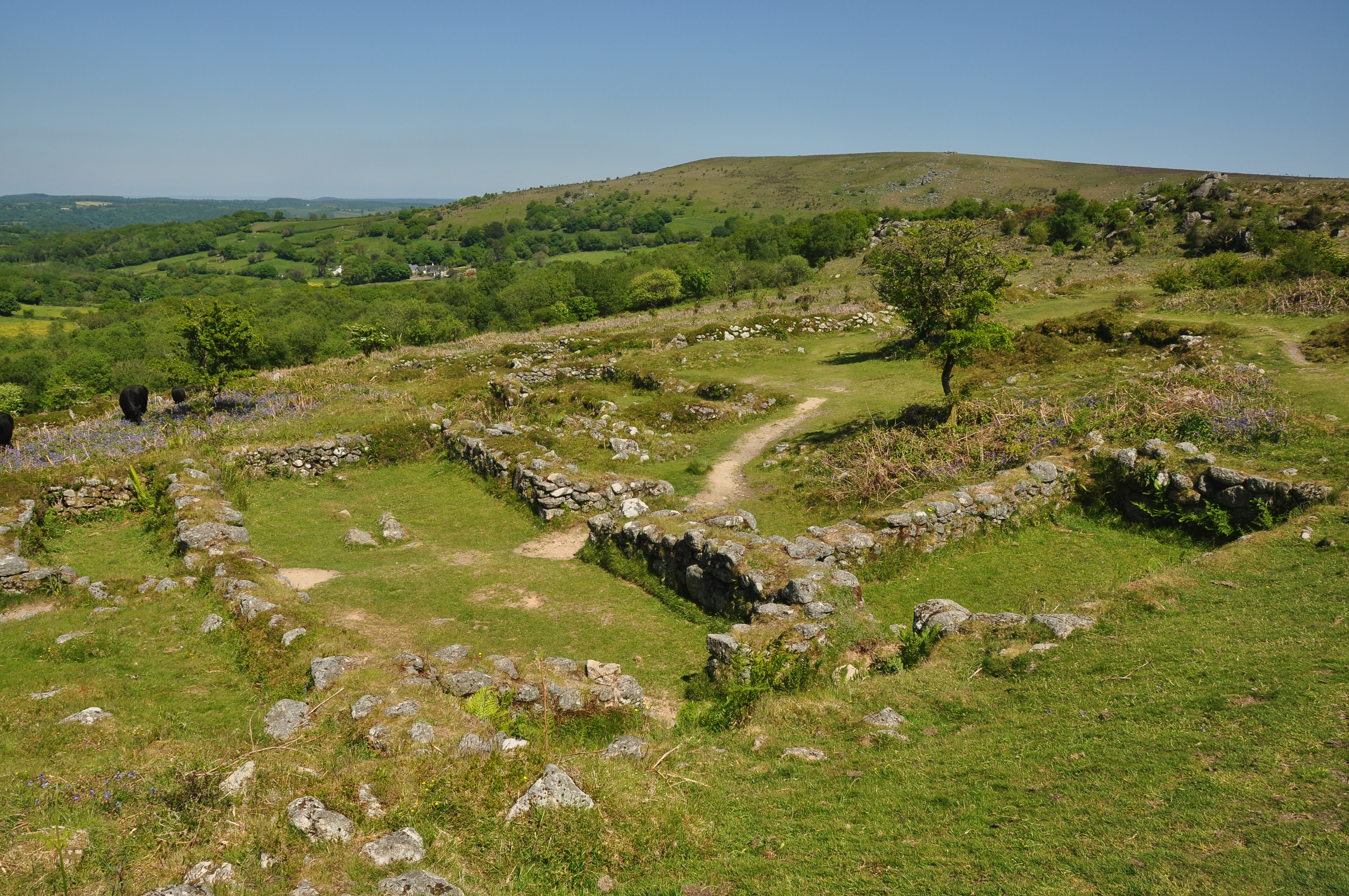
The medieval village at Hound Tor

The settlement is first mentioned in the Domesday Book as belonging to Tavistock Abbey:

Land for 4 ploughs. In Lordship 1 plough; 2 slaves; 1 virgate, 2 villages and 4 smallholders with 1 plough and 1 virgate. Meadow, 9 acres; woodland 2 acres; pasture, 1 league. 1 cattle; 28 sheep; 18 goats. Value 20 s.

The villagers apparently left little behind when they left, though the acidic soil would have destroyed much evidence; the excavations unearthed a single coin from the time of Henry III, and some broken pottery originating from Crockerton in Wiltshire.

== Other archaeological remains ==
There are a number of older remains of human occupation nearby, including a prehistoric farmstead 400 metres north-west of the settlement, and to the south are some Bronze Age hut circles.

Outlines of medieval fields can still be seen, especially from vantage points on top of the tor. The fields are bounded by "corn ditches" - granite walls fronting a ditch, with earth piled up behind the wall.

== Culture ==
According to a local legend Hound Tor was created when a pack of hounds were turned to stone (see Bowerman's Nose).

The 1975 Doctor Who story The Sontaran Experiment was shot on location at Hound Tor.

It is also thought to have inspired a number of artists and writers, such as Sir Arthur Conan Doyle in The Hound of the Baskervilles. Establishing shots in the episode The Hounds of Baskerville from the television series Sherlock were set there.

The tor is popular with rock climbers.

The 2016 British horror film The Unfolding was shot on location at Hound Tor and features the granite outcrop extensively in the film's cinematography.
