= Yarner Wood & Trendlebere Down =

Woodland in Devon, England

Coordinates: 50°35′42.22″N 3°43′35.13″W

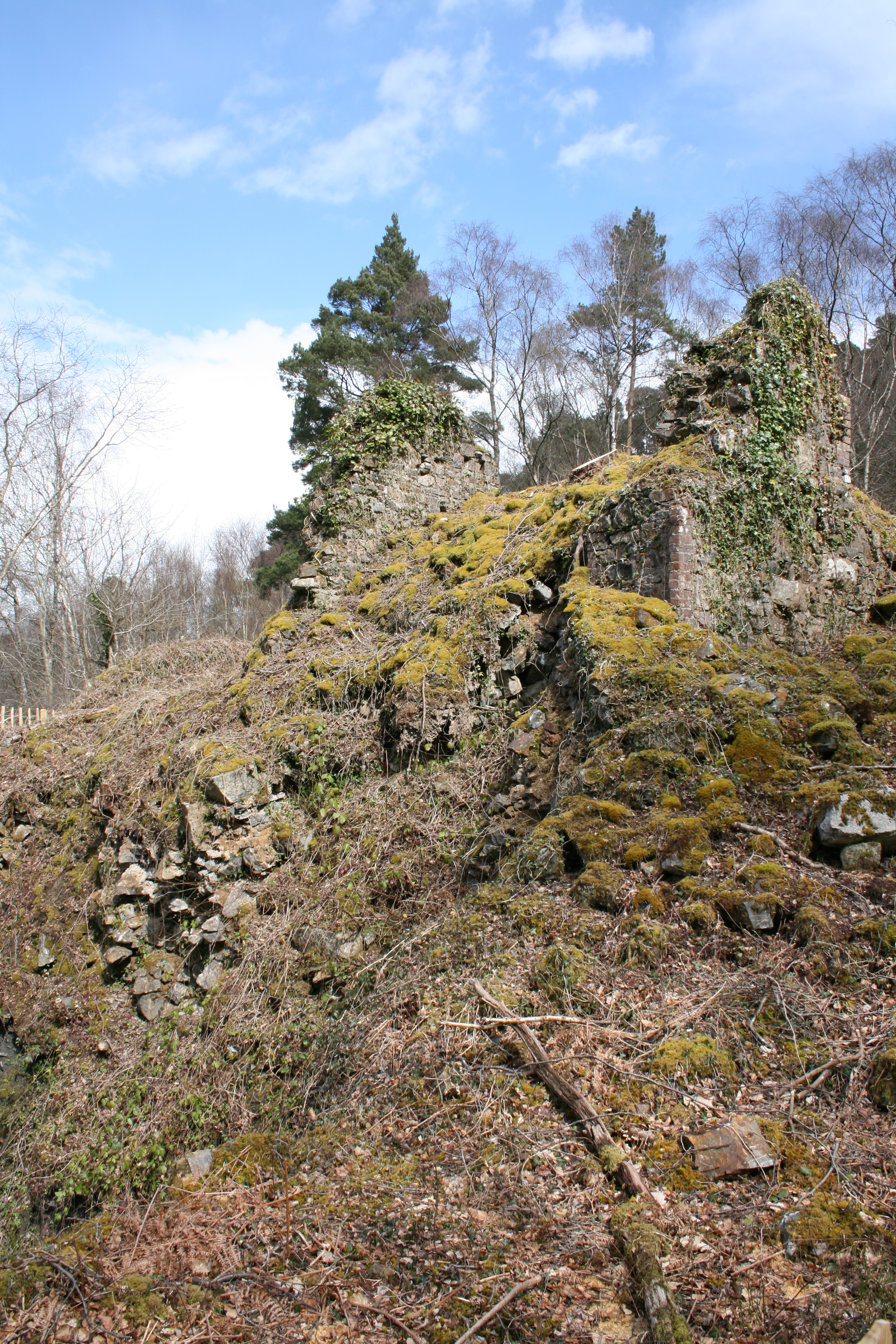
Remains of the copper mine engine house in Yarner Wood

Yarner Wood & Trendlebere Down in Dartmoor, Devon, England is a woodland managed by Natural England. The woodland is part of the East Dartmoor Woods and Heaths National Nature Reserve. The entire area is 777 acres (3.14 km^{2}) while Yarner Wood is 365 acres (1.48 km^{2}). Since 1985 the site has been designated a Site of Special Scientific Interest. Many types of tree grow in Yarner Wood including oak, birch, scots pine, larch and beech. It is home to buzzards, sparrow hawks, nightjars and pied flycatchers.

From 1857 to 1862, a copper mine operated in Yarner Wood and extracted ore which gave over 2000 tonnes of copper.

== See also ==
- List of Sites of Special Scientific Interest in Devon
- National nature reserves in England
