= Grade I listed buildings in Teignbridge =

There are over 9,000 Grade I listed buildings in England. This page is a list of these buildings in the district of Teignbridge in Devon.

== Teignbridge ==
Name	Location	Type	Completed (Note: The date given is the date used by Historic England as significant for the initial building or that of an important part in the structure's description.)	Date designated	Grid ref. (Note: The grid reference is based on the British national grid reference system, sometimes known as OSGB36, used by the Ordnance Survey.) Geo-coordinates	Entry number (Note: The "List Entry Number" is a unique number assigned to each listed building and scheduled monument by Historic England.)	Image
Church of St Andrew	Ashburton, Teignbridge	Tower	before 1449	7 August 1951	SX7552669760; 50°30′52″N 3°45′25″W	1201040	Church of St Andrew More images
Parish Church of St Nectan	Ashcombe, Teignbridge	Parish Church	13th century	30 June 1961	SX9121879559; 50°36′20″N 3°32′19″W	1308702	Parish Church of St Nectan More images
Church of St John the Baptist	Higher Ashton, Ashton, Teignbridge	Parish Church	Early 15th century	30 June 1961	SX8561484684; 50°39′02″N 3°37′10″W	1097856	Church of St John the Baptist More images
Church of St Mary the Virgin	Bickington, Teignbridge	Church	late 19th century or early C20	23 August 1955	SX7997072679; 50°32′29″N 3°41′43″W	1097150	Church of St Mary the Virgin More images
Church of St John the Baptist	Bishopsteignton, Teignbridge	Parish Church	12th century	23 August 1955	SX9109773502; 50°33′04″N 3°32′19″W	1147247	Church of St John the Baptist More images
Church of St Peter and St Paul and St Thomas of Canterbury	Bovey Tracey, Teignbridge	Tower	14th century	23 August 1955	SX8207278611; 50°35′43″N 3°40′03″W	1334077	Church of St Peter and St Paul and St Thomas of Canterbury More images
Bridford Barton	Bridford, Teignbridge	Farmhouse	Circa early-mid 14th century	9 March 1988	SX8162286423; 50°39′55″N 3°40′35″W	1318200	Bridford Barton More images
Church of St Thomas a Becket	Bridford, Teignbridge	Gate	19th century	30 June 1961	SX8160186381; 50°39′54″N 3°40′36″W	1097825	Church of St Thomas a Becket More images
Church of St Peter and St Paul	Broadhempston, Teignbridge	Parish Church	13th century	17 July 1987	SX8011866276; 50°29′02″N 3°41′28″W	1317828	Church of St Peter and St Paul More images
Canonteign Barton	Christow, Teignbridge	Manor House	Circa late 16th century	11 November 1952	SX8379183124; 50°38′10″N 3°38′41″W	1097834	Canonteign Barton More images
Church of Saint James the Apostle	Christow, Teignbridge	Parish Church	15th century	30 June 1961	SX8361385039; 50°39′12″N 3°38′52″W	1163790	Church of Saint James the Apostle More images
Hill	Christow, Teignbridge	Farmhouse	Former	9 October 1980	SX8353184246; 50°38′46″N 3°38′55″W	1097796	Hill More images
Church of St Mary and St Martin	Chudleigh, Teignbridge	Church	At least 1225	23 August 1955	SX8671479407; 50°36′12″N 3°36′08″W	1164590	Church of St Mary and St Martin More images
Ugbrooke Park	Chudleigh, Teignbridge	Country House	Late 16th century	23 August 1955	SX8756978053; 50°35′29″N 3°35′23″W	1097135	Ugbrooke Park More images
Church of St Barthelomew	Coffinswell, Teignbridge	Parish Church	Probably 13th century	23 August 1955	SX8912068430; 50°30′18″N 3°33′54″W	1164557	Church of St Barthelomew More images
Chapel of St Alban, Luscombe Castle, Including Attached Stables and Other Outbuildings	Dawlish, Teignbridge	Castle	1800	17 July 1951	SX9429576811; 50°34′53″N 3°29′40″W	1164298	Chapel of St Alban, Luscombe Castle, Including Attached Stables and Other Outbuildings More images
Church of St Mary the Virgin	Denbury, Denbury and Torbryan, Teignbridge	Parish Church	Early 14th century	15 October 1984	SX8237668853; 50°30′27″N 3°39′37″W	1170197	Church of St Mary the Virgin More images
Church of the Holy Trinity	Torbryan Hamlet, Denbury and Torbryan, Teignbridge	Parish Church	Early 15th century	23 August 1955	SX8198466832; 50°29′22″N 3°39′54″W	1249658	Church of the Holy Trinity More images
Church of St Michael	Doddiscombsleigh, Teignbridge	Parish Church	15th century	30 June 1961	SX8575786556; 50°40′03″N 3°37′05″W	1333908	Church of St Michael More images
Church of St Michael	Dunchideock, Teignbridge	Parish Church	13th century	30 June 1961	SX8761287675; 50°40′40″N 3°35′31″W	1334285	Church of St Michael More images
Church of St Mary	Dunsford, Teignbridge	Church	early 19th century or earlier	30 June 1961	SX8130389204; 50°41′25″N 3°40′54″W	1215069	Church of St Mary More images
Great Fulford House	Dunsford, Teignbridge	Country house	16th century	11 November 1952	SX7907291710; 50°42′45″N 3°42′51″W	1214302	Great Fulford House More images
Church of St Martin	Exminster, Teignbridge	Parish Church	Late 14th century	30 June 1961	SX9455787708; 50°40′46″N 3°29′38″W	1334270	Church of St Martin More images
Church of St Blaise	Haccombe, Haccombe with Combe, Teignbridge	Collegiate Church	13th century	23 August 1955	SX8980670198; 50°31′16″N 3°33′21″W	1168193	Church of St Blaise More images
Church of St Mary	Hennock, Teignbridge	Parish Church	15th century	23 August 1955	SX8301680923; 50°36′58″N 3°39′18″W	1166001	Church of St Mary More images
Church of St Michael	Ilsington, Teignbridge	Parish Church	Late 13th century or early 14th century	23 August 1955	SX7853476144; 50°34′21″N 3°43′00″W	1240794	Church of St Michael More images
Church of St Andrew	Ipplepen, Teignbridge	Church	1713	23 August 1955	SX8340866554; 50°29′14″N 3°38′42″W	1334135	Church of St Andrew More images
Church of St Andrew	Kenn, Teignbridge	Parish Church	Early 14th century	30 June 1961	SX9219785696; 50°39′39″N 3°31′36″W	1097721	Church of St Andrew More images
Church of All Saints	Kenton, Teignbridge	Parish Church	Circa 1360-70	30 June 1961	SX9579783311; 50°38′25″N 3°28′30″W	1169255	Church of All Saints More images
Church of St John the Baptist	Lustleigh, Teignbridge	Parish Church	13th century	23 August 1955	SX7850081274; 50°37′07″N 3°43′08″W	1334119	Church of St John the Baptist More images
Uphill, the Great Hall, and Oaknuve	Mapstone, Lustleigh, Teignbridge	Cruck House	Late medieval	23 August 1955	SX7824581652; 50°37′19″N 3°43′21″W	1334122	Upload Photo
Mamhead House	Mamhead, Teignbridge	Country House	1827-1833	11 November 1952	SX9304081092; 50°37′11″N 3°30′48″W	1170130	Mamhead House More images
Church of St Winifrid	Manaton, Teignbridge	Parish Church	15th century	23 August 1955	SX7493581280; 50°37′04″N 3°46′09″W	1097224	Church of St Winifrid More images
Neadon Upper Hall	Manaton, Teignbridge	House	1982-1983	23 August 1955	SX7504982433; 50°37′41″N 3°46′05″W	1097260	Neadon Upper Hall More images
Almshouses	Moretonhampstead, Teignbridge	Cruck House	Late Medieval	23 August 1955	SX7554586031; 50°39′38″N 3°45′44″W	1334200	Almshouses More images
Church of St Andrew	Moretonhampstead, Teignbridge	Church	15th century	23 August 1955	SX7553286092; 50°39′40″N 3°45′45″W	1334222	Church of St Andrew More images
Bradley Manor	Newton Abbot, Teignbridge	First Floor Hall House	Early 13th century	16 July 1949	SX8485070859; 50°31′34″N 3°37′33″W	1256765	Bradley Manor More images
Forde House	Newton Abbot, Teignbridge	Lobby Entry House	c. 1550	16 July 1949	SX8699670940; 50°31′38″N 3°35′44″W	1256796	Forde House More images
Parish Church of All Saints	Highweek, Newton Abbot, Teignbridge	Chapel of Ease	15th century	16 July 1949	SX8514572092; 50°32′14″N 3°37′20″W	1257209	Parish Church of All Saints More images
Parish Church of St Mary the Virgin	Newton Abbot, Teignbridge	Parish Church	Before 15th century	16 July 1949	SX8549270375; 50°31′19″N 3°37′00″W	1256897	Parish Church of St Mary the Virgin More images
Church of St John the Baptist	North Bovey, Teignbridge	Parish Church	13th century	23 August 1955	SX7393583832; 50°38′26″N 3°47′03″W	1097172	Church of St John the Baptist More images
Sanders	Lettaford, North Bovey, Teignbridge	Cross Passage House	Early 16th century	6 November 1972	SX7019184058; 50°38′30″N 3°50′14″W	1307005	Sanders More images
Church of St Bartholomew	East Ogwell, Ogwell, Teignbridge	Boiler House	C20	23 August 1955	SX8381170054; 50°31′07″N 3°38′25″W	1096697	Church of St Bartholomew More images
West Ogwell Church	West Ogwell, Ogwell, Teignbridge	Parish Church	Late 13th century	23 August 1955	SX8186770046; 50°31′06″N 3°40′04″W	1334475	West Ogwell Church More images
Powderham Castle	Powderham, Teignbridge	Fortified Manor House	Medieval	11 November 1952	SX9682483604; 50°38′35″N 3°27′38″W	1097666	Powderham Castle More images
Church of St Peter	Shaldon, Teignbridge	Church	1932	30 June 1949	SX9315272451; 50°32′31″N 3°30′33″W	1269235	Church of St Peter More images
The Starcross Pumping House	Starcross, Teignbridge	Railway Engine House	1845	11 November 1952	SX9774181752; 50°37′35″N 3°26′50″W	1097684	The Starcross Pumping House More images
Church of St Catherine of Alexandria	Church Town, Whitestone, Teignbridge	Parish Church	Medieval	4 September 1986	SX8687294355; 50°44′16″N 3°36′16″W	1216459	Church of St Catherine of Alexandria More images
Church of St Pancras	Widecombe in the Moor, Teignbridge	Parish Church	15th century	23 August 1955	SX7187976791; 50°34′36″N 3°48′39″W	1242571	Church of St Pancras More images
Higher Uppacott, Uppacott	Widecombe in the Moor, Teignbridge	House	Medieval	23 August 1955	SX7013172879; 50°32′28″N 3°50′03″W	1241837	Higher Uppacott, Uppacott More images
Church of St John the Baptist	Woodland Hamlet, Woodland, Teignbridge	Parish Church	15th century	23 August 1955	SX7912868758; 50°30′22″N 3°42′21″W	1263572	Church of St John the Baptist More images

== See also ==
- Grade II* listed buildings in Teignbridge
