= Grade II* listed buildings in Teignbridge =

There are over 20,000 Grade II* listed buildings in England. This page is a list of these buildings in the district of Teignbridge in Devon.

== Teignbridge ==
Name	Location	Type	Completed (Note: The date given is the date used by Historic England as significant for the initial building or that of an important part in the structure's description.)	Date designated	Grid ref. (Note: The grid reference is based on the British national grid reference system, sometimes known as OSGB36, used by the Ordnance Survey.) Geo-coordinates	Entry number (Note: The "List Entry Number" is a unique number assigned to each listed building and scheduled monument by Historic England.)	Image
Church of St Mary	Abbotskerswell, Teignbridge	Parish Church	13th century	23 August 1955	SX8560068753; 50°30′27″N 3°36′53″W	1334113	Church of St Mary More images
Town Farm Cottage	Abbotskerswell	Farmhouse	Circa late 15th century	17 July 1987	SX8570868809; 50°30′28″N 3°36′47″W	1334118	Upload Photo
32, 32a and 32b including detached Rear Building, West Street	Ashburton	Timber Framed House	Mid 18th century	7 August 1951	SX7547769797; 50°30′53″N 3°45′28″W	1282865	32, 32a and 32b including detached Rear Building, West Street
Card House, 10, North Street (Somerfield's)	Ashburton	Timber Framed House	late 17th century or early 18th century	7 August 1951	SX7558269927; 50°30′57″N 3°45′23″W	1201000	Card House, 10, North Street (Somerfield's)
Chapel of St Lawrence	Ashburton	Tower	Early 16th century	7 August 1951	SX7571369846; 50°30′55″N 3°45′16″W	1207789	Chapel of St Lawrence More images
Gate Piers and Boundary Wall in Front of Chapel of St Lawrence	Ashburton	Gate	19th century	10 May 1973	SX7569469827; 50°30′54″N 3°45′17″W	1207825	Gate Piers and Boundary Wall in Front of Chapel of St Lawrence
Conduit Head attached to front of 67a, East Street	Ashburton	Conduit Head	Early 18th century	7 August 1951	SX7583070027; 50°31′01″N 3°45′10″W	1187278	Conduit Head attached to front of 67a, East Street More images
Holne Bridge and its Abutments	Ashburton	Bridge	15th century to mid 16th century	7 August 1951 (Ashburton); 9 February 1961 (Holne)	SX7301570586; 50°31′16″N 3°47′34″W	1107419	Holne Bridge and its Abutments More images
Royal Oak Public House	Ashburton	House	late medieval	1 September 1992	SX7561069901; 50°30′56″N 3°45′21″W	1282914	Royal Oak Public House More images
The Golden Lion Hotel	Ashburton	Hotel	early or mid 18th century	7 August 1951	SX7583770003; 50°31′00″N 3°45′10″W	1282884	The Golden Lion Hotel More images
The Old Court House, St Lawrence Lane	Ashburton	House	1992	10 May 1973	SX7570369861; 50°30′55″N 3°45′16″W	1201022	Upload Photo
31 East Street	Ashburton	House	Early 18th century	7 August 1951	SX7569969957; 50°30′58″N 3°45′17″W	1200977	31 East Street
36 Stapledon Lane	Ashburton	Cross Passage House	early or mid 17th century	10 May 1973	SX7552670031; 50°31′00″N 3°45′26″W	1201025	Upload Photo
Lower Bramble Farmhouse	Ashton	Farmhouse	Circa early 16th century	11 November 1952	SX8691982793; 50°38′02″N 3°36′01″W	1097853	Upload Photo
Place Barton	Higher Ashton, Ashton	House	Early 16th century or earlier	11 November 1952	SX8541284720; 50°39′03″N 3°37′20″W	1097854	Upload Photo
Rydon Farmhouse	Ashton	Farmhouse	Early 16th century	9 March 1988	SX8456882868; 50°38′03″N 3°38′01″W	1333863	Upload Photo
Spara Bridge	Lower Ashton, Ashton	Road Bridge	1660	11 November 1952	SX8435184075; 50°38′41″N 3°38′13″W	1163425	Spara Bridge More images
Church House and Dove Cote	Bickington	House	1924	23 August 1955	SX7998772702; 50°32′30″N 3°41′42″W	1097153	Church House and Dove Cote More images
Manor House	Bickington	Farmhouse	Late 16th century	23 August 1955	SX7955172487; 50°32′23″N 3°42′04″W	1097156	Upload Photo
Cross House	Bishopsteignton	Villa	c. 1830	23 August 1955	SX9101973742; 50°33′12″N 3°32′23″W	1097762	Cross House More images
Green	Bishopsteignton	House	Early 17th century	2 December 1988	SX9106873620; 50°33′08″N 3°32′20″W	1147732	Green
Ruins of Bishop's Palace at Ash Hill Farm	Bishopsteignton	Bishops Palace	Probably Early 14th century	23 August 1955	SX9151074346; 50°33′32″N 3°31′59″W	1097789	Ruins of Bishop's Palace at Ash Hill Farm More images
Wear Farmhouse and Kitchen Garden Walls	Bishopsteignton	Farmhouse	Early 17th century	23 August 1955	SX8896173094; 50°32′49″N 3°34′07″W	1147196	Upload Photo
Chest Tomb 3 Metres South-east of South Aisle of Church of St Thomas	Bovey Tracey	Chest Tomb	1678	3 July 1986	SX8208478598; 50°35′43″N 3°40′02″W	1334078	Upload Photo
Chest Tomb 30 Metres South of Chancel of Church of St Thomas	Bovey Tracey	Chest Tomb	1655	3 July 1986	SX8208478604; 50°35′43″N 3°40′02″W	1097432	Upload Photo
Church of St John the Evangelist	Bovey Tracey	Church Hall	1851-53	3 July 1986	SX8131077775; 50°35′15″N 3°40′41″W	1097428	Church of St John the Evangelist More images
Nos. 20 (Manor Cottage), 22 (Cottage Retreat) and 24, East St	Bovey Tracey	House	19th century	3 July 1986	SX8184978586; 50°35′42″N 3°40′14″W	1097436	Upload Photo
Rumbling Tum Restaurant and Yew Tree Cottage, Fore St	Bovey Tracey	House	C20	23 August 1955	SX8161478526; 50°35′40″N 3°40′26″W	1317143	Rumbling Tum Restaurant and Yew Tree Cottage, Fore St
The Manor House	Bovey Tracey	House	Late medieval	23 August 1955	SX8184678570; 50°35′42″N 3°40′15″W	1097437	The Manor House More images
Cider House Adjoining Woodlands at the West	Bridford	Cider House	Probably 18th century	11 November 1952	SX8112687885; 50°40′42″N 3°41′02″W	1163575	Cider House Adjoining Woodlands at the West
Farmbuilding South of and Parallel to Woodlands Farmhouse	Bridford	Farm building	Probably late 17th century	11 November 1952	SX8115087909; 50°40′43″N 3°41′01″W	1163580	Upload Photo
Laployde Barton	Bridford	Farmhouse	Probably medieval	9 March 1988	SX8004385924; 50°39′38″N 3°41′55″W	1163456	Laployde Barton More images
Neadon Farm	Bridford	Farmhouse	Circa late medieval	9 March 1988	SX8258287226; 50°40′22″N 3°39′47″W	1163586	Neadon Farm
Woodlands Farmhouse and Barn adjoining at North East	Bridford	Farmhouse	Probably early 16th century	11 November 1952	SX8111987849; 50°40′41″N 3°41′02″W	1097829	Woodlands Farmhouse and Barn adjoining at North East More images
Ambrook Farmhouse including Courtyard Wall and Doorway to South	Broadhempston	Farmhouse	17th century	23 August 1955	SX8199265443; 50°28′37″N 3°39′52″W	1164219	Ambrook Farmhouse including Courtyard Wall and Doorway to South
Beaston, including Forecourt Containing Wall and Gate Piers to North-north-east	Beaston, Broadhempston	Manor House	1740-50	23 August 1955	SX7932566254; 50°29′01″N 3°42′08″W	1334142	Beaston, including Forecourt Containing Wall and Gate Piers to North-north-east More images
Buckfast Abbey, Main Block	Buckfast, Buckfastleigh	Abbey	Medieval	10 January 1951	SX7414167369; 50°29′33″N 3°46′33″W	1292865	Buckfast Abbey, Main Block More images
Church of St Mary (Buckfast Abbey)	Buckfast, Buckfastleigh	Abbey	Medieval	10 January 1951	SX7414767411; 50°29′35″N 3°46′32″W	1209774	Church of St Mary (Buckfast Abbey) More images
Parish Church of Holy Trinity	Buckfastleigh	Parish Church	13th century	10 January 1951	SX7424166572; 50°29′08″N 3°46′27″W	1209920	Parish Church of Holy Trinity More images
Church Ruins to East of Church of Holy Trinity	Buckfastleigh	Chapel	c. 1300	10 January 1951	SX7428666567; 50°29′07″N 3°46′24″W	1209046	Church Ruins to East of Church of Holy Trinity
Cabell Chest Tomb and Structure over Tomb to South of Church of Holy Trinity	Buckfastleigh	Chest Tomb	c. 1656	10 January 1951	SX7423266554; 50°29′07″N 3°46′27″W	1292829	Cabell Chest Tomb and Structure over Tomb to South of Church of Holy Trinity
26–29 Chapel Street	Buckfastleigh	Row	Late 17th century or early 18th century	6 January 1983	SX7379766127; 50°28′53″N 3°46′49″W	1292867	26–29 Chapel Street More images
Bowden Farmhouse	Buckland in the Moor	Cow House	late Medieval	23 August 1955	SX7270873650; 50°32′55″N 3°47′53″W	1292907	Bowden Farmhouse
Church of St Peter	Buckland in the Moor	Parish Church	15th century or early 16th century	23 August 1955	SX7204873135; 50°32′38″N 3°48′26″W	1209699	Church of St Peter More images
Aller Farmhouse	Christow	Farmhouse	Medieval roof	26 October 1983	SX8347884086; 50°38′41″N 3°38′58″W	1333894	Upload Photo
Barne End & New House	Christow	Farmhouse	Probably circa early 16th century	30 June 1961	SX8352284969; 50°39′10″N 3°38′57″W	1318044	Barne End & New House
Sea Hill	Christow	Farmhouse	Late medieval	11 November 1952	SX8314885478; 50°39′26″N 3°39′16″W	1097809	Upload Photo
Hams Barton	Chudleigh	House	Early 17th century	23 August 1955	SX8797480285; 50°36′41″N 3°35′05″W	1097128	Hams Barton More images
Remains of Bishops Palace at Palace Farmhouse	Chudleigh	Bishops Palace	Medieval	23 August 1955	SX8657278872; 50°35′55″N 3°36′15″W	1317585	Remains of Bishops Palace at Palace Farmhouse
The Bishop Lacy Public House	Chudleigh	Public House	Early 16th century	23 August 1955	SX8667479438; 50°36′13″N 3°36′10″W	1317670	The Bishop Lacy Public House More images
Whiteway House	Chudleigh	House	1770s	23 August 1955	SX8767682951; 50°38′07″N 3°35′23″W	1097095	Whiteway House More images
High Rixdale	Dawlish	House	17th century	17 July 1951	SX9431577680; 50°35′21″N 3°29′40″W	1096657	High Rixdale
Parish Church of St Gregory	Dawlish	Parish Church	Medieval	17 July 1951	SX9533076643; 50°34′48″N 3°28′47″W	1164203	Parish Church of St Gregory More images
Stonelands	Dawlish	Dower House	Early 19th century	17 July 1951	SX9496576884; 50°34′56″N 3°29′06″W	1096635	Upload Photo
Church House Inn	Torbryan Market, Denbury and Torbryan	Cross Passage House	Late 15th century or early 16th century	23 August 1955	SX8198966754; 50°29′19″N 3°39′54″W	1249793	Church House Inn More images
Lych Gate on South Side of Churchyard	Torbryan Hamlet, Denbury and Torbryan	Lych Gate	Probably 16th century	15 October 1984	SX8198466810; 50°29′21″N 3°39′54″W	1249659	Lych Gate on South Side of Churchyard
5 and 7 East Street	Denbury Village, Denbury and Torbryan	House	17th century addition	15 October 1984	SX8237168891; 50°30′29″N 3°39′37″W	1249653	Upload Photo
Lawrence Castle	Dunchideock	Tower	1788	12 February 1987	SX8753086148; 50°39′51″N 3°35′34″W	1097067	Lawrence Castle More images
Clifford Barton and adjoining Barn	Dunsford	Farmhouse	15th century and earlier	11 November 1952	SX7807790023; 50°41′49″N 3°43′40″W	1214299	Upload Photo
Lewis Hill	Dunsford	Kitchen	18th century	11 November 1952	SX8134689257; 50°41′27″N 3°40′52″W	1215492	Upload Photo
Sowton Barton	Dunsford	House	Medieval	4 September 1986	SX8336688845; 50°41′15″N 3°39′09″W	1214725	Sowton Barton
Westacombe Farmhouse	Dunsford	Farmhouse	Early 16th century	4 September 1986	SX7906690124; 50°41′53″N 3°42′49″W	1214815	Upload Photo
Devington Park (former Exe Vale Hospital)	Exminster	Hospital	1842-5	21 November 1985	SX9383188066; 50°40′57″N 3°30′15″W	1165495	Devington Park (former Exe Vale Hospital) More images
Church House	Combeinteignhead, Haccombe with Combe	Flats	1977	23 August 1955	SX9022071579; 50°32′01″N 3°33′01″W	1097737	Upload Photo
Church of All Saints	Combinteignhead, Haccombe with Combe	Parish Church	Medieval	2 December 1988	SX9018471535; 50°32′00″N 3°33′03″W	1147932	Church of All Saints More images
Tuckett's Farmhouse	Lower Netherton, Haccombe with Combe	Farmhouse	1904	2 December 1988	SX8903471830; 50°32′08″N 3°34′02″W	1097748	Tuckett's Farmhouse More images
Well-house immediately North-east of Tuckett's Farmhouse	Lower Netherton, Haccombe with Combe	Well	Early C20	2 December 1988	SX8904471834; 50°32′09″N 3°34′01″W	1307025	Upload Photo
Barn in the Farmyard at Tuckett's Farm	Lower Netherton, Haccombe with Combe	Barn	Early C20	23 August 1955	SX8907671834; 50°32′09″N 3°34′00″W	1333930	Upload Photo
Cider House and Store at Tuckett's Farm	Lower Netherton, Haccombe with Combe	Orchard	Probably Late 17th century	23 August 1955	SX8906071786; 50°32′07″N 3°34′00″W	1097750	Cider House and Store at Tuckett's Farm More images
Cider Press Basin in Farmyard at Tuckett's Farm	Lower Netherton, Haccombe with Combe	Cider Press	Probably 17th century	23 August 1955	SX8905571847; 50°32′09″N 3°34′01″W	1168392	Upload Photo
Cottage in the Farmyard at Tuckett's Farm	Lower Netherton, Haccombe with Combe	House	Probably Early 18th century	23 August 1955	SX8907171820; 50°32′08″N 3°34′00″W	1168400	Upload Photo
Former Stable at Tuckett's Farm	Lower Netherton, Haccombe with Combe	Cart Shed	Probably 18th century	23 August 1955	SX8904471795; 50°32′07″N 3°34′01″W	1307006	Upload Photo
Linhay about 5 Metres North-east of Tuckett's Farmhouse	Lower Netherton, Haccombe with Combe	Linhay	Probably 18th century or Early 19th century	23 August 1955	SX8904871844; 50°32′09″N 3°34′01″W	1097749	Upload Photo
Haccombe House	Haccombe, Haccombe with Combe	Apartment	18th century	23 August 1955	SX8982270124; 50°31′14″N 3°33′20″W	1168230	Haccombe House More images
Nos 1 and 2 Manor Cottages	Lower Netherton, Haccombe with Combe	House	Mid 17th century	23 August 1955	SX8919571715; 50°32′05″N 3°33′54″W	1097747	Nos 1 and 2 Manor Cottages More images
Clay Cutters Arms	Chudleigh Knighton, Hennock	Kitchen	C20	23 August 1955	SX8447277437; 50°35′07″N 3°38′00″W	1334111	Clay Cutters Arms More images
Pitt House	Hennock	Flats	1983	24 March 1983	SX8518778014; 50°35′26″N 3°37′24″W	1165950	Upload Photo
Warmhill Farmhouse	Warmhill, Hennock	Farmhouse	Late 16th century or 17th century	23 August 1955	SX8343880398; 50°36′42″N 3°38′56″W	1097386	Upload Photo
Church of St John the Baptist	Holcombe Burnell	Tower	Late 15th century	4 September 1986	SX8587491600; 50°42′46″N 3°37′04″W	1215659	Church of St John the Baptist More images
Culver House	Holcombe Burnell	Flats	1836	11 November 1952	SX8477890172; 50°41′59″N 3°37′58″W	1215572	Culver House
Holcombe Burnell Barton	Holcombe Burnell	Dairy	Former	11 November 1952	SX8591791607; 50°42′46″N 3°37′02″W	1215758	Holcombe Burnell Barton More images
Kingsford Farmhouse	Holcombe Burnell	Farmhouse	late Medieval	4 September 1986	SX8394591247; 50°42′33″N 3°38′42″W	1288023	Kingsford Farmhouse
Well	Ideford	House	late C16/early 17th century	23 August 1955	SX8797877006; 50°34′55″N 3°35′01″W	1165075	Upload Photo
Bagtor House	Ilsington	House	16th century	23 August 1955	SX7655175172; 50°33′48″N 3°44′40″W	1240450	Upload Photo
St Michael's Cottage	Ilsington	Row	1839	23 August 1955	SX7850876138; 50°34′20″N 3°43′01″W	1358910	Upload Photo
Sweet Sigford	Higher Sigford, Ilsington	House	Mid-late 16th century	13 December 2001	SX7813774501; 50°33′27″N 3°43′18″W	1389617	Upload Photo
Dornafield	Ipplepen	Farmhouse	Circa late 15th century	23 August 1955	SX8396768291; 50°30′10″N 3°38′15″W	1334134	Dornafield
Bickham House	Kenn	Country House	Early 18th century	11 November 1952	SX9152684351; 50°38′55″N 3°32′08″W	1333931	Bickham House More images
Trehill House	Kenn	Apartment	1950s	11 November 1952	SX9179984934; 50°39′14″N 3°31′55″W	1306949	Trehill House
Leslie House	Kenton South Town, Kenton	House	18th century	11 November 1952	SX9641083125; 50°38′19″N 3°27′59″W	1097682	Leslie House More images
Powderham Castle Bridge	Kenton	Bridge	18th century	2 December 1988	SX9658283445; 50°38′29″N 3°27′50″W	1169166	Powderham Castle Bridge More images
The White Bridge	Kenton	Road Bridge	c. 1830	2 December 1988	SX9303182605; 50°38′00″N 3°30′50″W	1263401	The White Bridge More images
Church of St Mary	Kingskerswell	Parish Church	Possibly 14th century	23 August 1955	SX8760867811; 50°29′57″N 3°35′10″W	1334161	Church of St Mary More images
Babcombe Manor	Kingsteignton	House	Mid 16th century	23 August 1955	SX8674276935; 50°34′52″N 3°36′04″W	1097081	Upload Photo
Bellamarsh Barton	Kingsteignton	Farmhouse	17th century	23 August 1955	SX8530477257; 50°35′02″N 3°37′17″W	1165120	Upload Photo
Church of St Michael	Kingsteignton	Parish Church	15th century	23 August 1955	SX8717472856; 50°32′40″N 3°35′37″W	1097088	Church of St Michael More images
The Chantry and Elmfield	Kingsteignton	House	1821	28 April 1987	SX8746072941; 50°32′43″N 3°35′23″W	1334282	Upload Photo
Caseley Court	Lustleigh	House	Late 16th century or early 17th century	23 August 1955	SX7858282118; 50°37′34″N 3°43′05″W	1309089	Upload Photo
Waye Farmhouse	Lustleigh	Farmhouse	Late medieval	3 July 1986	SX7763481264; 50°37′06″N 3°43′52″W	1166153	Waye Farmhouse
Church of St Thomas	Mamhead House, Mamhead	Parish Church	Probably 13th century or Earlier	30 June 1961	SX9312780814; 50°37′02″N 3°30′43″W	1170048	Church of St Thomas More images
Pool with Fountain in the Formal Garden south of Dawlish College (Mamhead House)	Mamhead House, Mamhead	Fountain	1827-1833	2 December 1988	SX9304081038; 50°37′09″N 3°30′48″W	1170185	Upload Photo
Stable Yard and Service Buildings north-west of Dawlish College (Mamhead House)	Mamhead House, Mamhead	Privy House	1828-1833	11 November 1952	SX9296781138; 50°37′12″N 3°30′52″W	1333960	Upload Photo
Sundial in the Formal Garden south of Dawlish College (Mamhead House)	Mamhead House, Mamhead	Sundial	1827-1833	2 December 1988	SX9305381036; 50°37′09″N 3°30′47″W	1097663	Upload Photo
Terrace Steps and Urns in the Formal Garden South of Dawlish College (Mamhead House)	Mamhead House, Mamhead	Steps	1827-1833	2 December 1988	SX9303181006; 50°37′08″N 3°30′48″W	1170200	Upload Photo
Terrace Wall to Terrace immediately south and east of Dawlish College (Mamhead House)	Mamhead House, Mamhead	Wall	1827-1833	2 December 1988	SX9307081091; 50°37′11″N 3°30′46″W	1097662	Upload Photo
The Obelisk	Mamhead	Obelisk	1742	2 December 1988	SX9252080752; 50°37′00″N 3°31′14″W	1333958	The Obelisk More images
The Orangery	Mamhead House, Mamhead	Estate Cottage	1740s	11 November 1952	SX9288780953; 50°37′06″N 3°30′56″W	1170208	Upload Photo
Easdon Farmhouse	Manaton	Farmhouse	Early 16th century	4 February 1987	SX7276881851; 50°37′21″N 3°48′00″W	1334180	Upload Photo
Great Houndtor Farmhouse	Manaton	Farmhouse	Early 17th century	23 August 1955	SX7492879565; 50°36′09″N 3°46′07″W	1166114	Upload Photo
Horsham	Manaton	Open Hall House	19th century	10 March 1977	SX7570281436; 50°37′10″N 3°45′30″W	1097256	Upload Photo
Outbuilding about 15m north of Neadon Upper Hall including Steps and Dog Kennel adjoining to north-east	Manaton	Cruck House	Late 15th century	4 February 1987	SX7503782450; 50°37′42″N 3°46′05″W	1308976	Upload Photo
(Pitt House) including Stable Range adjoining north	Moretonhampstead	Dairy	c. 1700	23 August 1955	SX7524586155; 50°39′42″N 3°45′59″W	1334202	Upload Photo
Fingle Bridge	Moretonhampstead	Bridge	Circa early 17th century	23 August 1955	SX7430989938; 50°41′44″N 3°46′52″W	1146775	Fingle Bridge More images
Hatherley	Sloncombe, Moretonhampstead	Farmhouse	Early 16th century	23 August 1955	SX7372786246; 50°39′44″N 3°47′17″W	1097187	Hatherley More images
Lowton Farmhouse	Moretonhampstead	Farmhouse	Early-mid 16th century	4 February 1987	SX7432385967; 50°39′35″N 3°46′46″W	1097238	Upload Photo
Mearsdon Manor	Moretonhampstead	House	Later 17th century	23 August 1955	SX7546586031; 50°39′38″N 3°45′48″W	1147008	Mearsdon Manor More images
Whiddon Park Deer Park Wall	Moretonhampstead	Wall	Probably medieval	4 February 1987	SX7272589338; 50°41′23″N 3°48′12″W	1146648	Whiddon Park Deer Park Wall More images
Church of St Mary Abbotsbury	Newton Abbot	Church	1904-1906	16 July 1949	SX8572971524; 50°31′56″N 3°36′49″W	1256768	Church of St Mary Abbotsbury More images
Church of St Paul	Newton Abbot	Church	1859-1861	16 July 1949	SX8642671192; 50°31′46″N 3°36′14″W	1257096	Church of St Paul More images
St Augustines Priory	Newton Abbot	House	Early 19th century	22 March 1983	SX8641069054; 50°30′37″N 3°36′12″W	1256845	St Augustines Priory More images
St Leonards Tower	Newton Abbot	Church tower	15th century	16 July 1949	SX8579871202; 50°31′46″N 3°36′45″W	1256725	St Leonards Tower More images
Bowden Farmhouse	North Bovey	Farmhouse	19th century	4 February 1987	SX7259983756; 50°38′22″N 3°48′11″W	1097194	Upload Photo
Gate House	North Bovey	Farmhouse	Mid to late 15th century	23 August 1955	SX7408083881; 50°38′28″N 3°46′56″W	1097177	Upload Photo
Lower West Coombe Farmhouse	West Coombe, North Bovey	Cross Passage House	Early 16th century	4 February 1987	SX7094882498; 50°37′40″N 3°49′33″W	1097138	Upload Photo
Manor House Hotel (Bovey Castle) including Terraces immediately to south-east	North Bovey	Country House	1907	16 January 1981	SX7314984472; 50°38′46″N 3°47′44″W	1097161	Manor House Hotel (Bovey Castle) including Terraces immediately to south-east More images
Church of St Clement	Powderham	Parish Church	15th century	30 June 1961	SX9725184413; 50°39′01″N 3°27′17″W	1333985	Church of St Clement More images
Stables House	Powderham	House	18th century	2 December 1988	SX9666183618; 50°38′35″N 3°27′46″W	1097668	Upload Photo
The Belvedere in Powderham Castle Park	Powderham	Estate Cottage	1771-1774	11 November 1952	SX9622184172; 50°38′53″N 3°28′09″W	1306164	The Belvedere in Powderham Castle Park More images
Church of St George	Shillingford St George, Shillingford St. George	Parish Church	Probably Medieval	30 June 1961	SX9038387801; 50°40′46″N 3°33′10″W	1165990	Church of St George More images
Brickhouse	Starcross	House	Probably Late 17th century	11 November 1952	SX9440780950; 50°37′07″N 3°29′38″W	1097698	Brickhouse More images
Mowlish Manor	Starcross	House	Late 16th century	2 December 1988	SX9508381022; 50°37′10″N 3°29′04″W	1097703	Mowlish Manor More images
Church of St Andrew	Stokeinteignhead	Parish Church	Late C14/C15	23 August 1955	SX9156170442; 50°31′25″N 3°31′52″W	1097645	Church of St Andrew More images
Church of St Mary	Tedburn St. Mary	Tower	late C14/early 15th century	4 September 1986	SX8062594468; 50°44′15″N 3°41′35″W	1215975	Church of St Mary More images
Little Hackworthy	Tedburn St. Mary	Farmhouse	circa late 15th century	6 February 1980	SX8015293264; 50°43′36″N 3°41′58″W	1216075	Upload Photo
Windout Farmhouse	Tedburn St. Mary	Kitchen	17th century	11 November 1952	SX8112391967; 50°42′55″N 3°41′07″W	1287701	Windout Farmhouse More images
Church of St Peter and St Paul	Teigngrace	Parish Church	1787	23 August 1955	SX8497673924; 50°33′13″N 3°37′30″W	1166346	Church of St Peter and St Paul More images
Clock House, Stover School	Stover Park, Teigngrace	Gate	c. 1830	23 August 1955	SX8365174111; 50°33′19″N 3°38′38″W	1308973	Upload Photo
Former Stables to Stover House about 50m to north	Stover Park, Teigngrace	Stable	1779	3 July 1986	SX8384174264; 50°33′24″N 3°38′28″W	1308968	Upload Photo
Stover House	Stover Park, Teigngrace	Country House	1776-81	3 July 1986	SX8384674204; 50°33′22″N 3°38′28″W	1334127	Stover House More images
The Granite Lodge adjacent A38 about 1550m north-north-west of Stover House	Stover Park, Teigngrace	Gate Lodge	Probably c1830	23 August 1955	SX8338075670; 50°34′09″N 3°38′53″W	1308943	The Granite Lodge adjacent A38 about 1550m north-north-west of Stover House More images
Bitton House	Teignmouth	House	Late 18th century	30 June 1949	SX9350173055; 50°32′51″N 3°30′16″W	1269155	Bitton House More images
Church of St James (Parish Church of West Teignmouth)	Teignmouth	Church	13th century	30 June 1949	SX9393973098; 50°32′53″N 3°29′54″W	1269111	Church of St James (Parish Church of West Teignmouth) More images
United Reformed Church and attached Wall	Teignmouth	Church	1903	29 July 1983	SX9434073117; 50°32′54″N 3°29′34″W	1269098	United Reformed Church and attached Wall More images
Chicks	Trusham	Farmhouse	Probably late 15th century	3 July 1986	SX8545182215; 50°37′42″N 3°37′15″W	1308907	Upload Photo
Church of Saint Michael	Trusham	Parish Church	1259	23 August 1955	SX8559282176; 50°37′41″N 3°37′08″W	1308904	Church of Saint Michael More images
The Old Rectory	Trusham	Farmhouse	Late C15-early 16th century	23 August 1955	SX8558882322; 50°37′46″N 3°37′08″W	1097345	Upload Photo
Barn to the East of Glebe House	Church Town, Whitestone	Garage	circa early 16th century	4 September 1986	SX8685494319; 50°44′15″N 3°36′17″W	1227870	Upload Photo
Glebe House	Whitestone	House	Late 16th century	11 November 1952	SX8682494326; 50°44′15″N 3°36′19″W	1287465	Upload Photo
Church House Sexton's Cottage	Widecombe in the Moor, Widecombe in the Moor	Clergy House	Early 16th century	23 August 1955	SX7183576780; 50°34′36″N 3°48′41″W	1259960	Church House Sexton's Cottage More images
Corndon Ford Farmhouse	Widecombe in the Moor	Farmhouse	15th century or 17th century or earlier	23 August 1955	SX6924574531; 50°33′21″N 3°50′50″W	1260487	Upload Photo
Cressen Hayes and Little Cressen Hayes	Lower Town, Widecombe in the Moor	House	Early 16th century	3 November 1986	SX7110072861; 50°32′29″N 3°49′14″W	1242408	Cressen Hayes and Little Cressen Hayes More images
Higher Tor Farmhouse	Widecombe in the Moor	House	1955	23 August 1955	SX6978272606; 50°32′19″N 3°50′20″W	1260392	Upload Photo
Lake Farmhouse	Poundsgate, Widecombe in the Moor	Farmhouse	Late 16th century or early 17th century	23 August 1955	SX7043872294; 50°32′10″N 3°49′47″W	1242528	Lake Farmhouse
Ley Farmhouse	Widecombe in the Moor	Cross Passage House	16th century or earlier	3 November 1986	SX7231279389; 50°36′01″N 3°48′20″W	1241844	Upload Photo
Lower Tor Farmhouse	Widecombe in the Moor		later alterations	23 August 1955	SX6978972586; 50°32′19″N 3°50′20″W	1241903	Upload Photo
Middle Bonehill Farmhouse, including Garden Wall in front of right hand side of House	Bonehill, Widecombe in the Moor	Cross Passage House	Early 19th century	23 August 1955	SX7253677508; 50°35′00″N 3°48′06″W	1242234	Middle Bonehill Farmhouse, including Garden Wall in front of right hand side of House
Middle Natsworthy Farmhouse	Widecombe in the Moor	Cross Passage House	Probably Late 17th century or early 18th century	16 January 1986	SX7226379680; 50°36′10″N 3°48′23″W	1260291	Upload Photo
New Bridge	Widecombe in the Moor	Bridge	15th century	23 August 1955	SX7114870881; 50°31′25″N 3°49′09″W	1241905	New Bridge More images
Outbuilding about 20m north-east of Sherwell Farmhouse	Widecombe in the Moor	Outbuilding	1986	3 November 1986	SX6789974919; 50°33′33″N 3°51′59″W	1260196	Upload Photo
Rowden Farmhouse	Widecombe in the Moor	Farmhouse	Late 17th century or early 18th century	3 November 1986	SX6996876375; 50°34′21″N 3°50′16″W	1242051	Rowden Farmhouse More images
Tunhill Farmhouse	Widecombe in the Moor	Farmhouse	Probably Late Medieval	3 November 1986	SX7271675789; 50°34′05″N 3°47′55″W	1260138	Upload Photo
Higher Woodland Cottages	Woodland Hamlet, Woodland	Farmhouse	Early 16th century	23 August 1955	SX7910768757; 50°30′22″N 3°42′22″W	1263534	Upload Photo

== See also ==
- Grade I listed buildings in Teignbridge
