= John Pike Jones =

English politician and antiquarian

- Born: 1790; Chudleigh
- Died: 1857 (aged 66–67); Cheadle, Staffordshire
- Occupations: Politician and antiquarian

John Pike Jones (1790 – 4 February 1857) was an English politician and antiquarian.

== Biography ==
Jones was the eldest son of John Jones, a tradesman at Chudleigh, Devonshire. John Pike Jones was born at Chudleigh in 1790. On 4 July 1809, he was admitted as sizar at Pembroke College, Cambridge, when his name was entered as John Jones only, and in 1813 he graduated B.A. Next year he took holy orders, and was curate of North Bovey in Devonshire from 1816 until 1831. In 1819 he was nominated to two benefices, one in the diocese of Peterborough and the other in that of Lincoln, and he produced to the respective bishops the three testimonials, from three beneficed clergymen, which are required before institution. His diocesan at Exeter declined to countersign them on the ground that Jones, at a county meeting at Exeter Castle on 23 April 1819, had used in his speech some improper expressions, apparently on the Athanasian Creed, and his institution to these livings, of the joint value of 500l. a year, was refused. The matter was brought before the House of Lords by Lord Holland (12 May 1820), on a petition from Jones; but a motion for a committee thereon was rejected by 18 votes to 35. On 12 May 1829, he was instituted, probably through his advocacy of Roman Catholic claims, to the vicarage of Alton, Staffordshire, in the gift of Lord Shrewsbury, and on 12 May 1832 he was instituted to the lord chancellor's benefice of Butterleigh, Devonshire. At Alton, where he lived, Jones was for many years an active politician. He died suddenly at Cheadle, Staffordshire, on 4 February 1857.

While in Devonshire, Jones published several political and antiquarian works. In politics his works were: 1. ‘A True and Impartial Account of the Parliamentary Conduct of Sir T. D. Acland. By a Freeholder of Devon,’ 1819. 2. ‘Substance of Speech at County Meeting at Exeter Castle, 16 March 1821’ [advocating catholic emancipation], 1821. 3. ‘Substance of Speech at Meeting of Devon County Club, 1 Aug. 1828,’ 1828. In antiquities he wrote: 1. ‘Botanical Tour through various parts of Devon and Cornwall,’ 1820; 2nd ed. 1821. 2. ‘Historical and Monumental Antiquities of Devonshire,’ 1823. 3. ‘Guide to Scenery in Neighbourhood of Ashburton,’ 1823; another ed. 1830. 4. ‘Observations on Scenery and Antiquities at Moreton-Hampstead and on Forest of Dartmoor,’ 1823. 5. ‘Ecclesiastical Antiquities of Devon,’ 1828. The introduction, ‘On the preservation and restoration of our churches,’ and the articles signed ‘Devoniensis’ were by Jones, the other portions by Dr. Oliver. In 1840 Oliver brought out three volumes of ‘Ecclesiastical Antiquities in Devon,’ and omitted the communications of Jones, with the exception of the introduction. 6. ‘Flora Devoniensis, or a Descriptive Catalogue of Plants growing wild in Devon. By the Rev. J. P. Jones and J. F. Kingston,’ 1829.

Some of Jones's unpublished manuscripts on Devonshire and Cornwall, formerly belonging to Mary Jones, his sister, who died on 25 April 1883, at the age of eighty-six, are now in the Bodleian Library, Oxford. Miss Jones published in 1852 a ‘History of Chudleigh.’
