= Bridford =

Village in Devon, England

Coordinates: 50.666°N 3.675°W

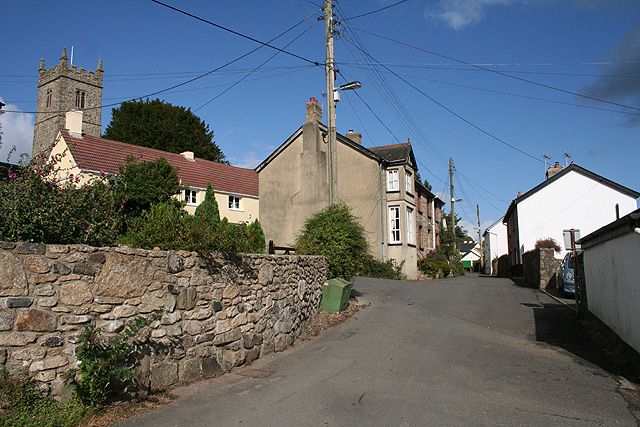
- Bridford: near the church

- Location within Devon
- Population: 503
- OS grid reference: SX816865
- Shire county: Devon
- Region: South West
- Country: England
- Sovereign state: United Kingdom
- Post town: Exeter
- Postcode district: EX6
- Dialling code: 01647
- Police: Devon and Cornwall
- Fire: Devon and Somerset
- Ambulance: South Western
- UK Parliament: Central Devon

Bridford is a village and civil parish in south west England, located in the Teign Valley, Devon on the edge of Dartmoor. The parish is surrounded (clockwise from the north) by the parishes of Dunsford, Doddiscombsleigh, Christow, and Moretonhampstead. At the 2011 census the population of the parish was 503, compared with 404 in 1901.

== History ==
The place-name 'Bridford' is first attested in a charter of circa 1080, where surprisingly it appears as Bridaford. It is recorded as Brideforda in the Domesday Book of 1086. The name means 'brides' ford', and has the same derivation as Britford in Wiltshire.

== Today ==
Bridford has a village pub called the Bridford Inn. The Post Office visits every Thursday afternoon for 2 hours in the village hall, and the doctor's surgery is open five days a week in neighbouring Christow. There is a MOT and general servicing garage and garden centre within 2 miles of Bridford. There is a children's play park, a village garden and a village hall. The village also has a two-acre Woodland Trust nature reserve and Rowdon Woods. It has a bus service to Exeter.

Bridford's church is dedicated to St Thomas Becket. There is also a tiny Methodist chapel in the centre of the village.

The village has clubs such as scouts, women's institute, darts and skittles teams. Teign Valley Golf Club is four miles away and there is a football pitch and tennis courts in Christow two miles distant.

Children from Bridford go to neighbouring primary schools in the neighbouring villages of Christow, Dunsford or Doddiscombsleigh. They then attend Teign school, an Academy.

Bridford has its annual village summer fête in July. It is twinned with Saint-Vaast-sur-Seulles, a village in the Normandy region of France.
