= Fresney-le-Puceux =

- Commune
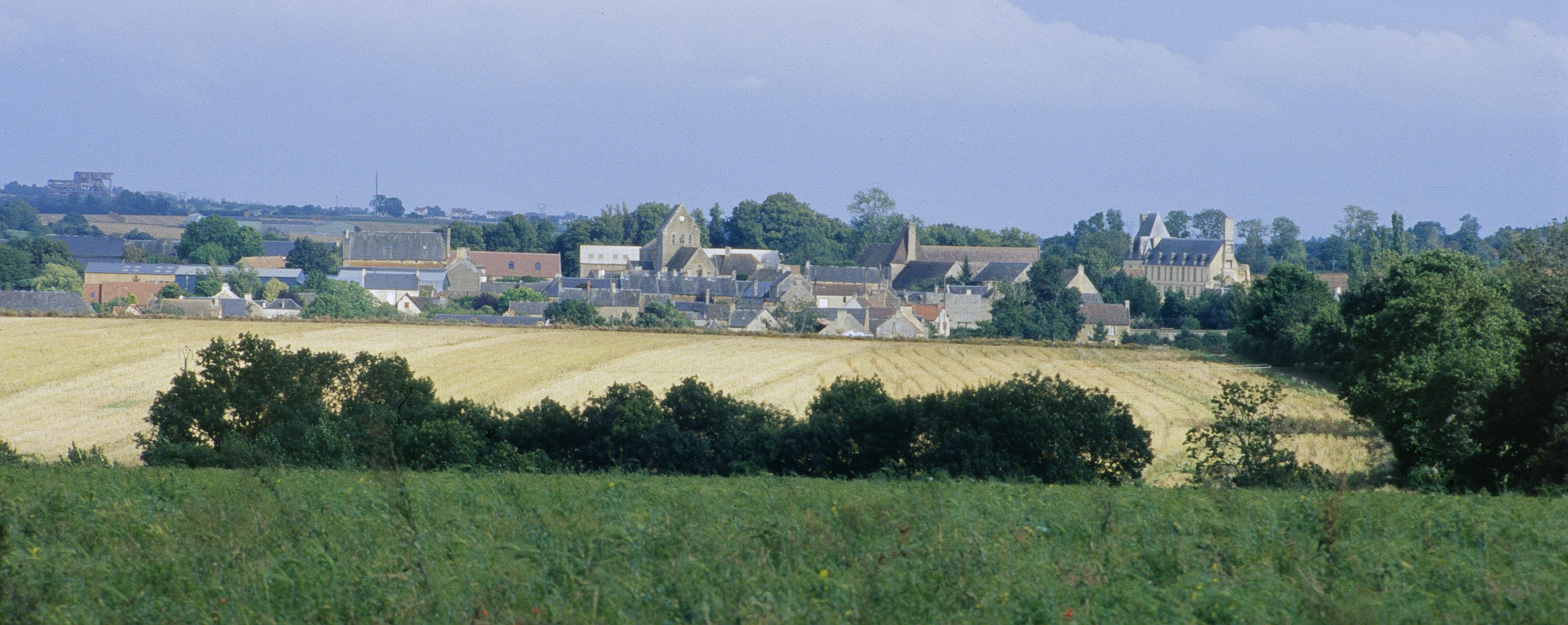
- A general view of Fresney-le-Puceux
- Location of Fresney-le-Puceux
- Location within France Location within Normandy
- Coordinates: 49°03′49″N 0°22′13″W
- Country: France
- Region: Normandy
- Department: Calvados
- Arrondissement: Caen
- Canton: Le Hom
- Intercommunality: Cingal-Suisse Normande

Government
  - Mayor (2020–2026): Jean-Pol Chavaria
- Area^{1}: 9.65 km^{2} (3.73 sq mi)
- Elevation: 60 m (200 ft)
- Highest elevation: 108 m (354 ft)
- Lowest elevation: 20 m (66 ft)
- Population (2023): 808
  - Density: 83.7/km^{2} (217/sq mi)
- Time zone: UTC+01:00 (CET)
  - Summer (DST): UTC+02:00 (CEST)
- INSEE/Postal code: 14290 /14680
- ^{1} French Land Register data, which excludes lakes, ponds, glaciers > 1 km^{2} (0.386 sq mi or 247 acres) and river estuaries.

Fresney-le Puceux (French pronunciation: [fʁɛnɛ lə pysø]) is a commune in the Calvados department in the Normandy region in northwestern France.

== Geography ==
The commune is made up of the following collection of villages and hamlets, Le Pont de Fresney, La Planche à la Housse and Fresney-le-Puceux.

The Commune with another 20 communes shares part of a 2,115 hectare, Natura 2000 conservation area, called the Vallée de l'Orne et ses affluents.

The river Laize, a tributary to the Orne, flows through the commune. in addition there is a 2 km stream called the Ruisseau du Val Distrait.

== Population ==
Historical population
Year	Pop.	±% p.a.
1968	524	—
1975	534	+0.27%
1982	587	+1.36%
1990	615	+0.58%
1999	657	+0.74%
2007	602	−1.09%
2012	757	+4.69%
2017	822	+1.66%
2023	808	−0.29%
Source: INSEE

== Points of Interest ==
=== National Heritage sites ===
The Commune has two buildings and areas listed as a Monument historique

- Château à Fresney-le-Puceux sixteenth century chateaux listed as a monument in 1930.
- La Pierre Tournante ou La Pierre du Camp Bérot Menhir a Neolithic Menhir, known by two names, La Pierre Tournante & La Pierre du Camp Bérot listed as a monument in 1956.

== Twin towns – sister cities ==
Fresney-le-Puceux along with Boulon & Saint-Laurent-de-Condel is twinned with:

- Dunsford & Doddiscombsleigh, England, United Kingdom

== See also ==
- Communes of the Calvados department
