= Stokelake =

School in Devon, England

Coordinates: 50.595°N 3.619°W

Stokelake Residential School was in Chudleigh, South Devon. It was classed as the senior school of Pitt House School Ltd and the chairman was Mr. M. C. Spedding who was also Chairman of Torquay United Football Club in the early 1960s.

The site was quite extensive, with a main block, dining with TV - cinema room, library, and dormitory block. It had a classroom complex, and large gymnasium as well as its own farm. Stokelake also had an excellent football team.

The school held 120 pupils at any one time. Its parental school was Pitt House, at Torquay, which held a further 180 pupils at any one time, and another school that was owned by Pitt House School Ltd was Rocklands in Newton Abbot.

Stokelake ceased to be a school when it closed down in 1980 and Pitt House School closed down on 15 May 1984.

In 2000, an investigation revealed possible widespread child abuse at Stokelake and other residential schools in Devon.
