= Saint-Laurent-de-Condel =

- Commune
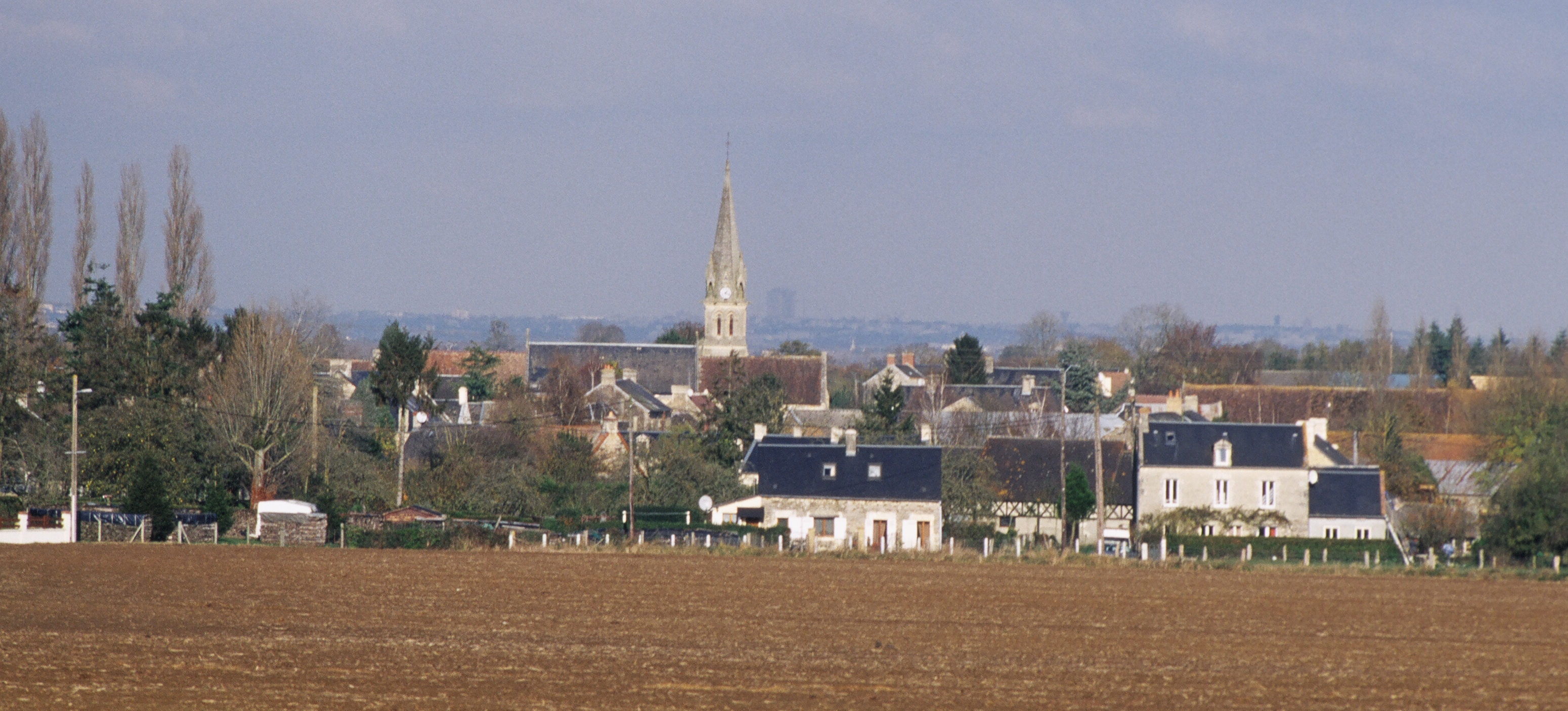
- A general view of Saint-Laurent-de-Condel
- Location of Saint-Laurent-de-Condel
- Location within France Location within Normandy
- Coordinates: 49°02′31″N 0°24′49″W
- Country: France
- Region: Normandy
- Department: Calvados
- Arrondissement: Caen
- Canton: Le Hom
- Intercommunality: Cingal-Suisse Normande

Government
  - Mayor (2020–2026): Vincent Chataigner
- Area^{1}: 12.31 km^{2} (4.75 sq mi)
- Elevation: 114 m (374 ft)
- Highest elevation: 187 m (614 ft)
- Lowest elevation: 85 m (279 ft)
- Population (2023): 512
  - Density: 41.6/km^{2} (108/sq mi)
- Time zone: UTC+01:00 (CET)
  - Summer (DST): UTC+02:00 (CEST)
- INSEE/Postal code: 14603 /14220
- ^{1} French Land Register data, which excludes lakes, ponds, glaciers > 1 km^{2} (0.386 sq mi or 247 acres) and river estuaries.

Saint-Laurent-de-Condel (French pronunciation: [sɛ̃ loʁɑ̃ də kɔ̃dɛl]) is a commune in the Calvados department in the Normandy region in northwestern France.

== Geography ==
The commune is part of the area known as Suisse Normande.

The Coupe-Gorge stream and La Grande Vallee stream are the only watercourses running through the commune.

== Population ==
Historical population
Year	Pop.	±% p.a.
1968	344	—
1975	386	+1.66%
1982	417	+1.11%
1990	413	−0.12%
1999	447	+0.88%
2007	515	+1.79%
2012	477	−1.52%
2017	501	+0.99%
2023	512	+0.36%
Source: INSEE

== Points of interest ==
=== National heritage sites ===
- Saint-Laurent-de-Condel Church is a thirteenth century church which was listed as a Monument historique in 1927.

== Twin towns – sister cities ==
Saint-Laurent-de-Condel along with Fresney-le-Puceux & Boulon is twinned with:

- Dunsford & Doddiscombsleigh, England, United Kingdom

== See also ==
- Communes of the Calvados department
