= Castle Dyke =

Iron Age hill fort in Devon, England

Coordinates: 50.5826°N 3.5249°W

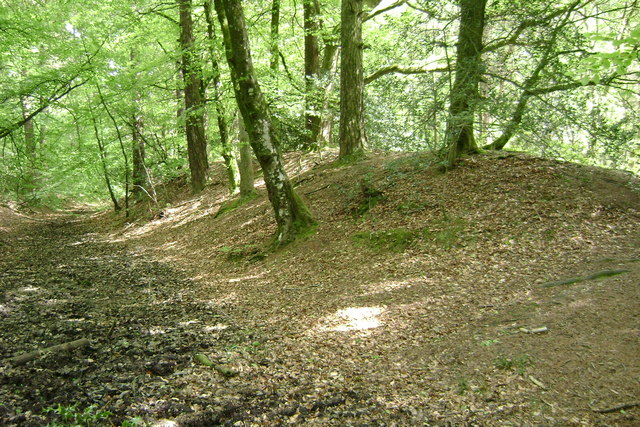
Rampart and ditch inside Castle Dyke

Location of Castle Dyke in Devon

Castle Dyke is an Iron Age hill fort situated between Chudleigh and Dawlish in Devon, England. The fort is situated on a hilltop at approximately 140 metres (460 ft) above sea level.
