= Boulon =

- Commune
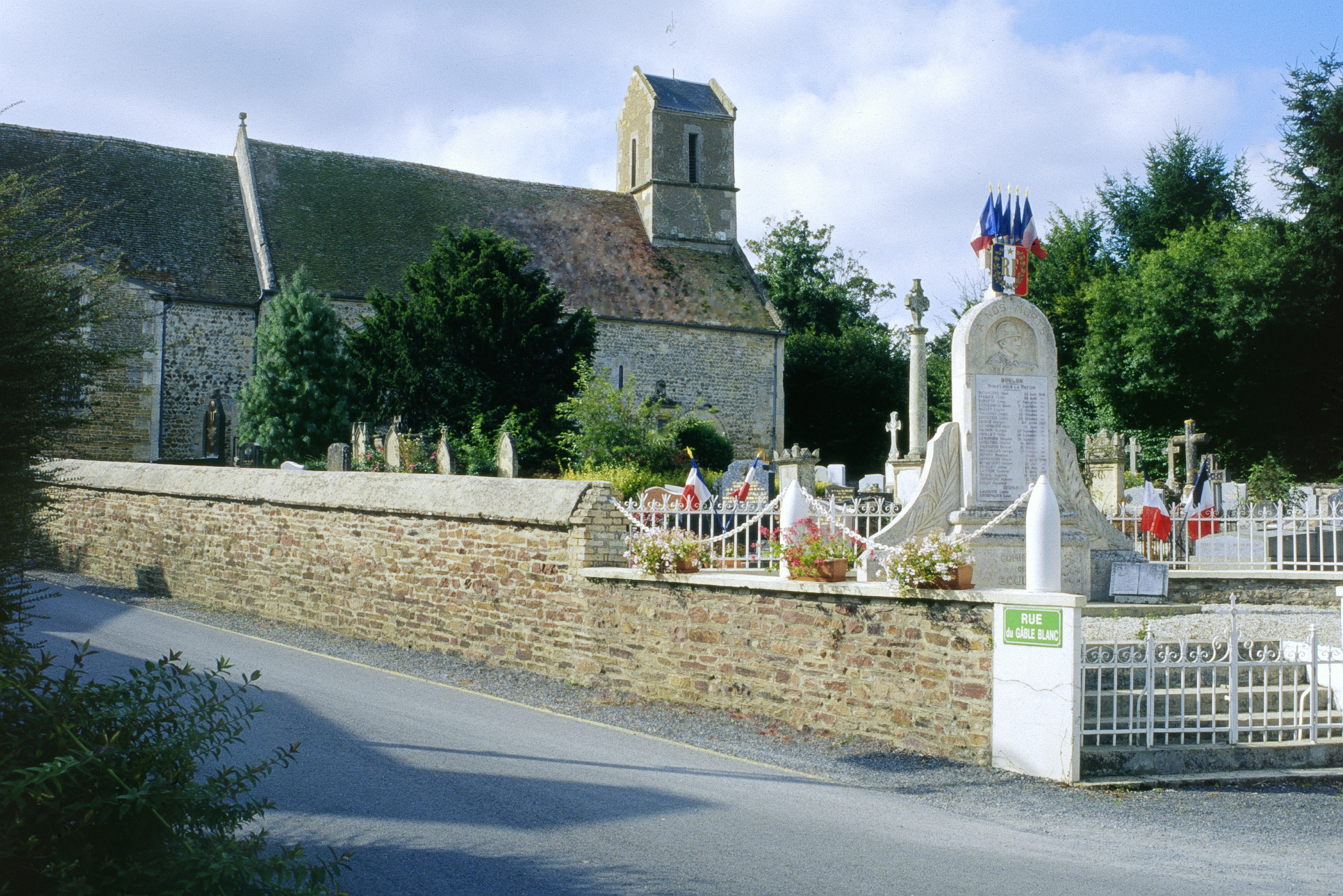
- The church in Boulon
- Location of Boulon
- Location within France Location within Normandy
- Coordinates: 49°02′55″N 0°23′30″W
- Country: France
- Region: Normandy
- Department: Calvados
- Arrondissement: Caen
- Canton: Le Hom
- Intercommunality: Cingal-Suisse Normande

Government
  - Mayor (2020–2026): Bernard Leblanc
- Area^{1}: 14.96 km^{2} (5.78 sq mi)
- Elevation: 100 m (330 ft)
- Highest elevation: 142 m (466 ft)
- Lowest elevation: 29 m (95 ft)
- Population (2023): 844
  - Density: 56.4/km^{2} (146/sq mi)
- Time zone: UTC+01:00 (CET)
  - Summer (DST): UTC+02:00 (CEST)
- INSEE/Postal code: 14090 /14220
- ^{1} French Land Register data, which excludes lakes, ponds, glaciers > 1 km^{2} (0.386 sq mi or 247 acres) and river estuaries.

Boulon (French pronunciation: [bulɔ̃]) is a commune in the Calvados department in the Normandy region in northwestern France.

== Geography ==
The commune is made up of the following collection of villages and hamlets, Le Hutray, Gable-Blanc and Boulon.

Two watercourses, Le Tourtous and the Ruisseau du Val Distrait flows through the commune.

The commune borders the area known as Suisse Normande.

== Points of Interest ==
=== National Heritage sites ===
- Eglise Saint-Pierre twelfth century church listed as a monument in 1913.

== Twin towns – sister cities ==
Boulon along with Fresney-le-Puceux & Saint-Laurent-de-Condel is twinned with:

- Dunsford & Doddiscombsleigh, England, United Kingdom
