= Moretonhampstead =

Town in Devon, England

Coordinates: 50.6603°N 3.7671°W

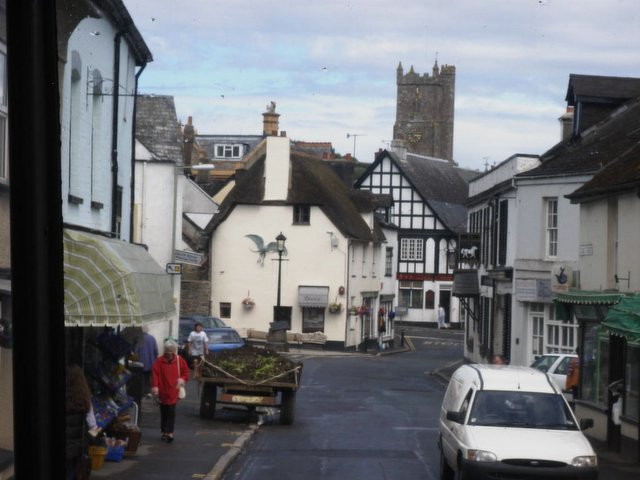
- Town centre

- Location within Devon
- Population: 1,728 (2021 Census)
- OS grid reference: SX752860
  - London: 215 miles (346 km)
- Civil parish: Moretonhampstead
- District: Teignbridge
- Shire county: Devon
- Region: South West
- Country: England
- Sovereign state: United Kingdom
- Post town: NEWTON ABBOT
- Postcode district: TQ13
- Dialling code: 01647
- Police: Devon and Cornwall
- Fire: Devon and Somerset
- Ambulance: South Western
- UK Parliament: Central Devon
- Website: http://www.moretonhampstead.com/

Moretonhampstead is a market town, (Note: Since 1207, Moretonhampstead has held the right to hold a regular market, making it a market town. However, the parish council has not elected to give itself the status of a town as it could do under s.245(6) of the Local Government Act 1972, so it does not have a town council and cannot elect a Mayor.) parish and ancient manor in Devon, situated on the north-eastern edge of Dartmoor, within the Dartmoor National Park. The parish now includes the hamlet Doccombe (/ˈdɒkəm/), and it is surrounded clockwise from the north by the parishes Drewsteignton, Dunsford, Bridford, Bovey Tracey, Lustleigh, North Bovey and Chagford.

According to the 2021 census, it had a population of 1,728, which was slightly more than the 1,703 recorded at the 2011 census. The Moretonhampstead electoral ward had a population of 2,880 in 2021. The parish church is dedicated to St. Andrew. Along with a few other places in Devon, it has one of the longest place names in England, with 16 letters. Moretonhampstead is twinned with Betton in France.

== Toponymy ==
The Domesday Book of 1086 records the manor as MORTONE. This part of the name derives from the Old English for a town or village in moorland, referring to the town's situation on Dartmoor.

Moreton is the moor town, and the moor is Dartmoor; but the old spelling is retained in Moreton, though in Dartmoor it is obsolete – nobody writes Dartmore now. Such a name as Moretonhampstead is absurd, for tun and ham and stede are Anglo-Saxon words, all meaning the same thing.

— Cecil Torr, Small Talk at Wreyland Vol II

In 1493 the town was recorded as "Morton Hampstead" in the Calendar of Inquisitions Post Mortem, with 'ham' and 'stede' both being Anglo-Saxon words for a home or enclosed area, but seemingly unnecessary to the historical context of the settlement.

The Oxford Names Companion (1991) speculates this may be a family name, or a nearby place. However The Cambridge Dictionary of English Place-Names (2004) simply says the reason for the addition is unknown.

The 'Hampstead' part of the name was not always used, with the Recovery Rolls from the Court of Common Pleas in 1692 noting it as "Moreton al. Moreton Hampstead", indicating that both long and short forms may be used. Local noted antiquarian Cecil Torr states that the town continued to be known simply as Moreton to the majority of people prior to the arrival of the railway, which made the station Moretonhampstead in order to distinguish it from other towns called Moreton on the railways network, with 45 other settlements called Moreton or Morton.

== History ==
The central region of Devon was occupied by the Saxons sometime after 710. Over time, it was divided into a number of estates, and one of these divisions included all land within the boundaries of the rivers Teign and Bovey, with Moreton as its major settlement.

The present parish of over 6,000 acres (24 km^{2}) is the remainder of an ancient royal estate. It remained a royal estate immediately after the Norman Conquest of 1066, as is recorded in the Domesday Book of 1086, where it is listed as the 45th of the 72 Devonshire holdings of King William the Conqueror. The manor was held by grand serjeanty from the king by Richard de Burgh, 2nd Earl of Ulster (1259–1326) during the reign of King Edward I (1272–1307), for the annual yielding of one sparrow hawk.

After that time it was the seat of Sir Philip de Courtenay (killed at Stirling 1314), second son of Sir Hugh de Courtenay (died 1292), feudal baron of Okehampton, by his wife Eleanor le Despenser (died 1328), sister of Hugh le Despenser, 1st Earl of Winchester, and younger brother of Hugh de Courtenay, 1st/9th Earl of Devon (1276–1340) of Tiverton Castle. When he died childless Moretonhampstead was inherited by his elder brother the Earl of Devon, who gave Moretonhampstead to his third son Robert de Courtenay, who made it his seat. Robert's grandson William de Courtenay (1377–1388) died childless, and eventually the manor became the property of Sir Philip Courtenay (1340–1406) of Powderham, 5th or 6th son of Hugh Courtenay, 2nd Earl of Devon (1303–1377). Thenceforth it descended with the Powderham estate and, in the time of Pole (died 1635), belonged to Francis Courtenay (1576–1638), de jure 4th Earl of Devon.

Wool and (in later years) the manufacture of woollen cloth formed the basis of the town's economy for over 700 years. The economy was evidently healthy when Moretonhampstead established a water-powered fulling mill before the end of the 13th century.

In 1207 King John granted a weekly market and an annual five-day fair, indicating that Moretonhampstead had developed into an important local community. The town grew steadily through the Middle Ages and remained prosperous until the end of the 17th century, when the wool industry began to decline. The town continued to be a local trading centre and a rest stop for travellers on the difficult routes across Dartmoor and from Exeter and Newton Abbot.

The population of the town in the 1841 census was 1,450 inhabitants.

A series of fires in the 20th century destroyed many of Moretonhampstead's ancient buildings, but sufficient still remain to demonstrate the Saxon and medieval heritage, and its later industrial prosperity. Much of the town is a designated conservation area, with many listed buildings being of architectural and historic interest. The whole parish lies within Dartmoor National Park.

=== The sparrowhawk ===
When King John granted the town its charter during the 13th century, the rent was set as one sparrowhawk per year. The bird has become something of a symbol for the town and is to be incorporated into works of public art under development by an artist in residence, Roger Dean.

=== Notable residents ===
- Rev Dr James Fynes (1695 – 1774), a kinsman of the Dukes of Newcastle, served as Rector from 1735 until his death. Previously Vice-President of Magdalen College, Oxford.
- Matthew Towgood III (1727–1791), an English Presbyterian minister and banker.
- James Jackson (1757–1806), an early British-born Georgia politician, 23rd governor of Georgia.
- George Parker Bidder (1806–1878), known as "the calculating boy", a calculating prodigy and engineer.
- Reginald Engelbach (1888–1946), an English Egyptologist and engineer, has works in the Egyptian Museum in Cairo

== Places of interest ==
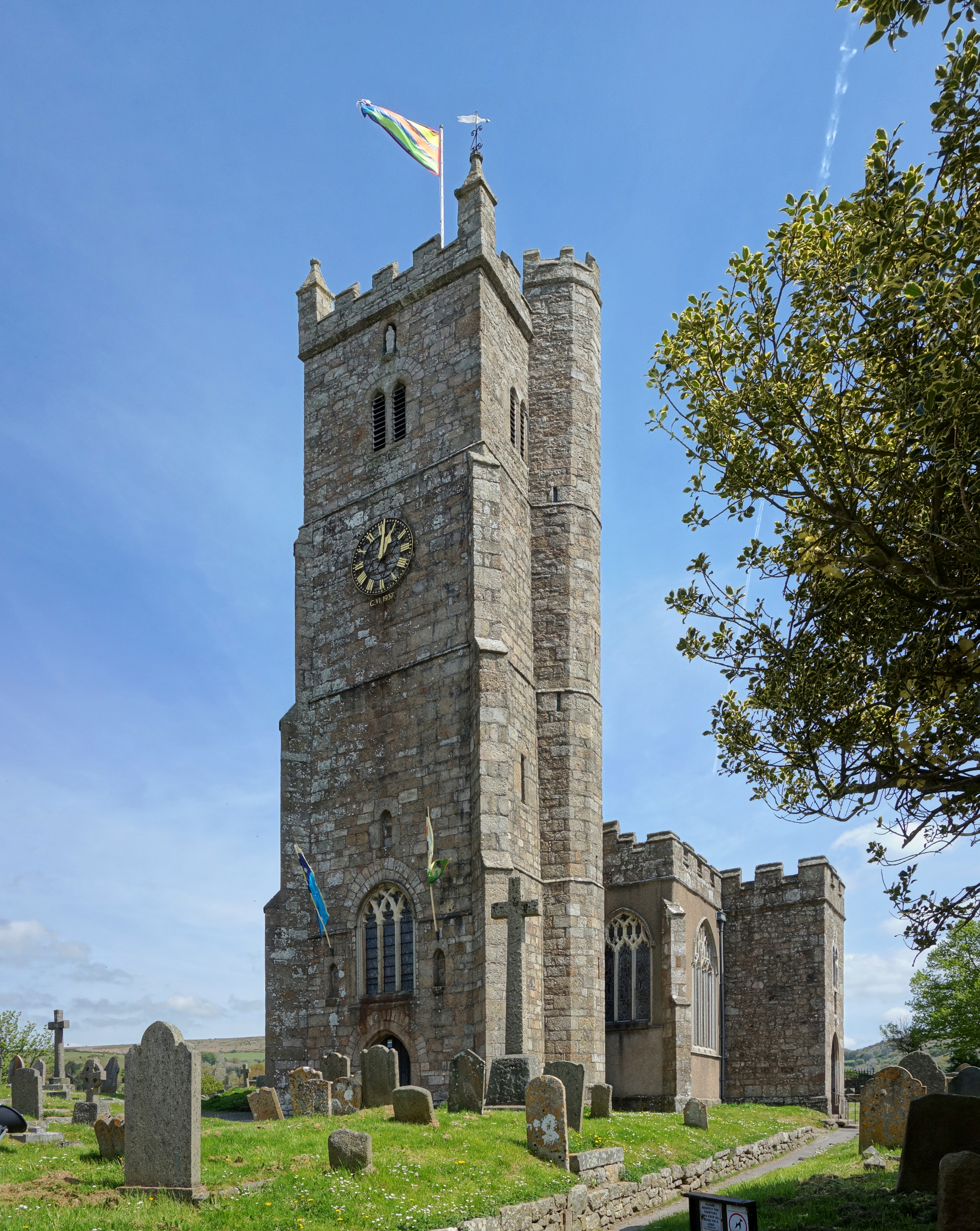
The Church of St Andrew, Moretonhampstead

=== The Cross Tree ===
The Cross Tree, immortalised by R. D. Blackmore in his 1882 novel Christowell, is now only represented by a cross minus its shaft, which is enclosed near the almshouses. This famous dancing tree, a fine old elm, cut and clipped in the form of a punch bowl (by which name it was also known), has long since disappeared, and in its place a beech tree has been planted. It was around the original tree that the village lads and lasses would dance and it recorded that French officers on parole from Dartmoor Prison at Princetown during the Napoleonic Wars, "did assemble around the Cross Tree with their Band".

=== Almshouses ===
Standing behind the Cross Tree are the famous almshouses, built in solid granite. The date of 1637 on the outside is actually the date they were refurbished. Recent research has shown that the main core of these buildings are at least two hundred years older. Early in the 19th century the building was converted from two tenements into four and the facade was damaged. By 1938 they had fallen into disrepair. In 1940 they were purchased for the town and converted back into two tenements. In 1952 they were purchased by the National Trust.

=== St Andrew's Church ===
The Grade I listed parish church, dedicated to St. Andrew, is at the eastern end of the town. Its imposing four-stage tower with pentagonal stair-turret was being built by 1418. The entire church is built of granite blocks although the body is roughcast. It has a two-storey porch, battlemented like the tower. Inside, the north and south aisles are separated from the nave by arcades of five bays, constructed of octagonal granite piers. All the windows are of standard Perpendicular design, and according to Pevsner there is "a singular absence of fitments of interest", due to the heavy restorations the church was subjected to in 1856 and in 1904–5. All the ledger stones were removed with the floor flagstones in the first restoration, but above the south door a wall memorial to Rev Francis Whiddon, MA (died 1656) who "was 32 years minister of this parish" survives. There is also a classical monument by Edward Bowring Stephens to a Captain John Newcombe (died 1855), and a tower screen of wood and glass of 1980.

== Tourism ==
Moretonhampstead relies heavily on tourism, and has done so for a long time. Its position makes it a base to explore both Dartmoor and Devon. The central part of the town stands at an altitude of 700 feet (210 m) but a short stroll within the parish will elevate the walker to beyond 1,100 feet (340 m) and afford views of the surrounding area. Moretonhampstead has four pubs and three cafes. There is a wide selection of hotels, bed and breakfast, self-catering and camping accommodation.

Moretonhampstead has a good range of sporting facilities and the proximity of Dartmoor makes it popular with ramblers and cyclists, in particular for mountain biking.

=== Events ===
Moretonhampstead has an annual carnival, held in the fourth week in August which raises funds for local groups and associations. Since 2012 it has also held an annual flag festival: in 2017 it took place in mid-June. Other events include a fireworks night, annual pantomime, food and drink festival and music events spread throughout the year.

== Transport ==
The town lies on the A382 road, connecting it to the trunk A38 and A30 roads.

Moretonhampstead railway station was opened by the Moretonhampstead and South Devon Railway on the south side of the town on 26 June 1866. It closed to passengers on 28 February 1959, although goods trains continued until 6 April 1964. After this the goods shed and engine shed continued to be used for many years by a commercial road haulage business.

Bus services are from the car park just west of the town centre and include services to Exeter (359/173) and Okehampton/Newton Abbot (178).

== Sport and recreation ==
Moretonhampstead has King George's Field, a memorial to King George V. This facility includes indoor courts for basketball etc., a gym and also conference rooms to rent. It has cricket fields a camping site, football facilities and a skate park.

== See also ==
- Tozer, a family surname believed to have arisen in Moretonhampstead in the 15th century.
