= Lower Ashton =

Village in Devon, England

Coordinates: 50°38′46″N 3°38′09″W

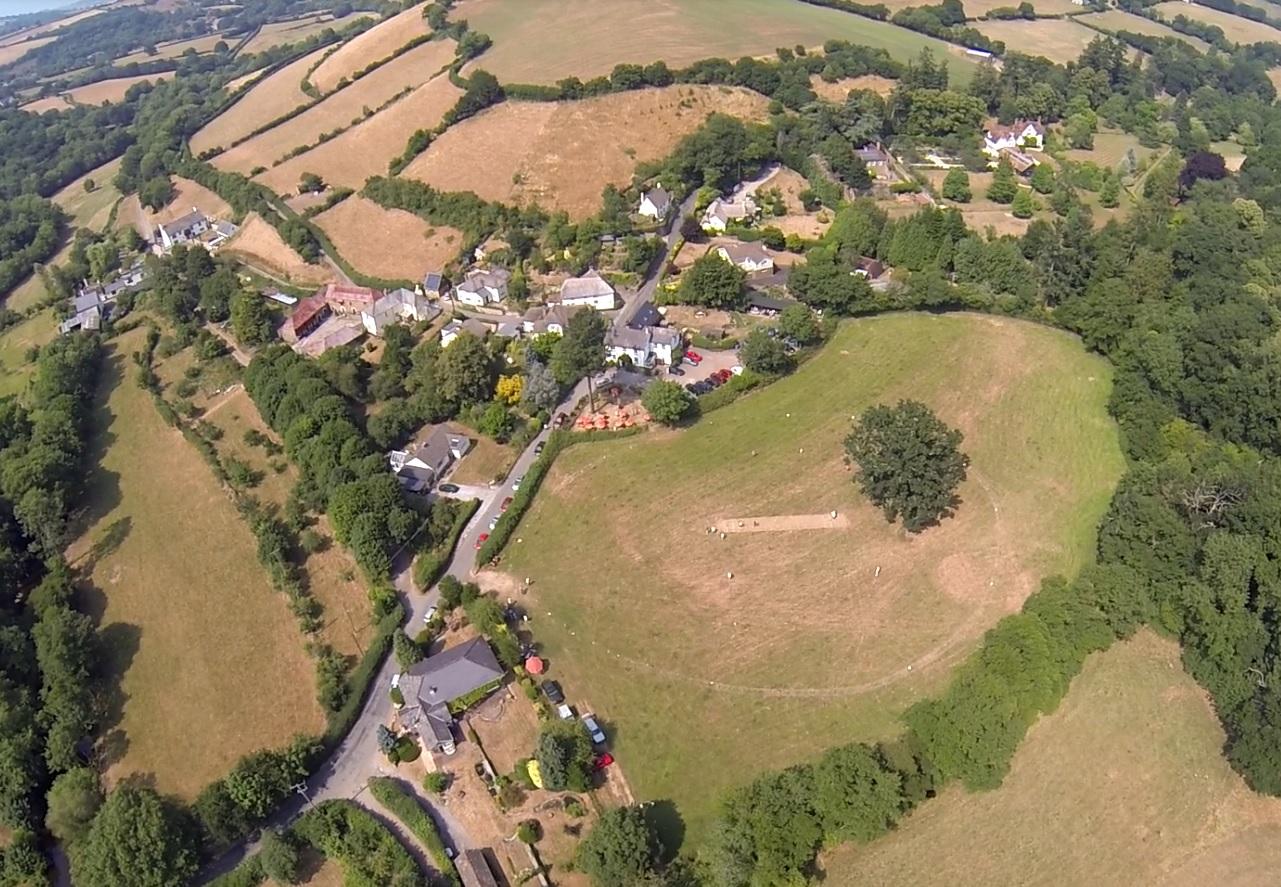
Lower Ashton from UAV during village cricket

Lower Ashton is a village on the western slopes of Haldon in Teignbridge, Devon, England. Along with Higher Ashton it is part of the civil parish of Ashton, which in 2001 had a population of 174. Its bridge across the River Teign, known as Spara Bridge, was built in 1660 and is a grade II* listed structure.
