= St Andrew's Church, Moretonhampstead =

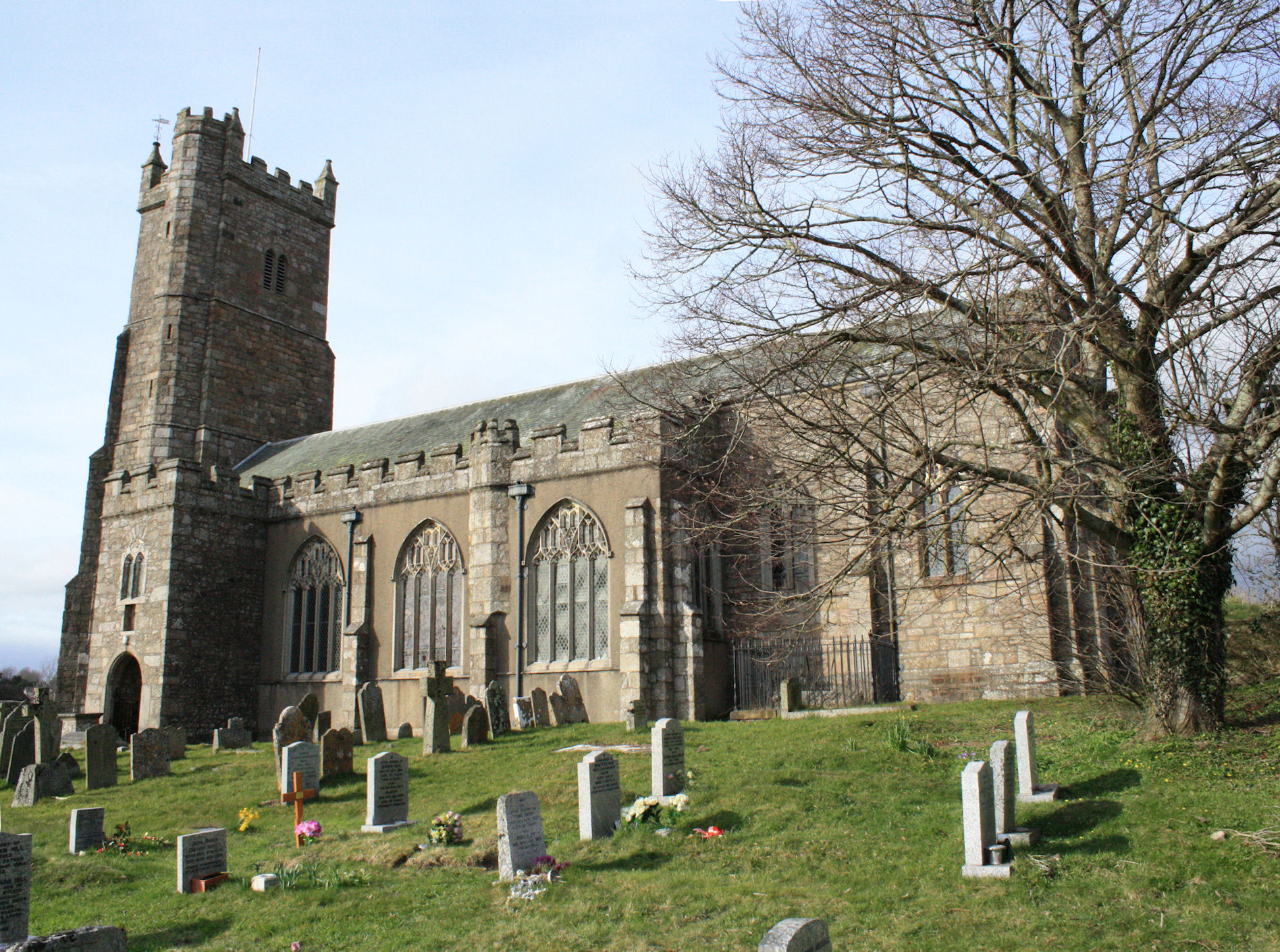
- St Andrew's Church, Moretonhampstead

- Location within Devon
- 50°39′40.1″N 3°45′44.5″W
- OS grid reference: SX 75532 86092
- Location: Moretonhampstead
- Country: England
- Denomination: Church of England

History
- Dedication: Saint Andrew

Architecture
- Heritage designation: Grade I listed
- Designated: 23 August 1955

Administration
- Province: Canterbury
- Diocese: Exeter
- Archdeaconry: Totnes
- Deanery: Moreton
- Parish: Moretonhampstead

St Andrew's Church, Moretonhampstead is a Grade I listed parish church in the Church of England Diocese of Exeter in Moretonhampstead, Devon.

== History ==
The church comprises an early 15th-century tower, with a late 15th-century nave and aisles.

In 1856–57, the church was re-pewed. The north side was started in October 1856 and the south side completed shortly afterwards. The medieval chancel screen was reportedly in a poor condition and removed.

A further restoration was carried out between 1904 and 1905. The chancel was lengthened by 9 feet (2.7 m) to make room for an organ which was the gift of Mr Tilby of Teignmouth in memory of his wife. A stained glass window was added to the chancel in memory of William Henry Smith. A new chancel screen was erected to a similar design to that removed in 1856. All of the seating was replaced with oak pews. The wooden flooring in the aisles was replaced with Minton tiling. The old gallery at the west end of the church was removed, and the roof replaced by an oak wagon roof. The walls of the church had the plaster removed, and central heating was installed. The new altar was consecrated by the Bishop of Exeter on 6 April 1905.

=== Rectors ===
- 1276 Robert de Cumbe I
- 1298 Robert de Cumbe II
- 1303 Edmund de Burgo
- 1309 Philip de Valletort
- 1362 Richard Holewill
- 1381 John Colyer
- 1381 Henry Brokeland
- 1404 William Bruter
- 1416 Richard Penels
- 1419 Thomas Byrd
- 1438 Walter Colles
- 1453 Peter Courtenay
- 1456 John Combe
- 1459 Roger Keys
- 1459 John Combe
- 1478 Thomas Beke
- 1491 Thomas Combe
- 1499 Christopher Speke
- 1502 John Wenman
- 1504 Thomas Haydon
- 1519 John Rogland
- 1526 Richard Parker
- 1539 Thomas Parker
- 1544 John Lyb
- 1560 Robert James
- 1581 Nicholas Marston
- 1624 Francis Whiddon
- 1656 Robert Woolcombe
- 1663 Robert Manly
- 1672 Lewis Sharpe
- 1696 Matthew Atwell
- 1721 Joseph Shebbeare
- 1735 James Fynes
- 1774 Thomas Clack
- 1508 George Crowther
- 1807 William Charles Clack
- 1865 William Courtenay Clack
- 1901 Stanley Daws Dewey
- 1927 Matthew Graham Leadbitter
- 1956 Anthony Derwent Coleridge
- 1968 John Anthony Benton
- 1974 Roland Denys Peek
- 1985 John H. Heath
- ???? Simon Franklin

== Organ ==
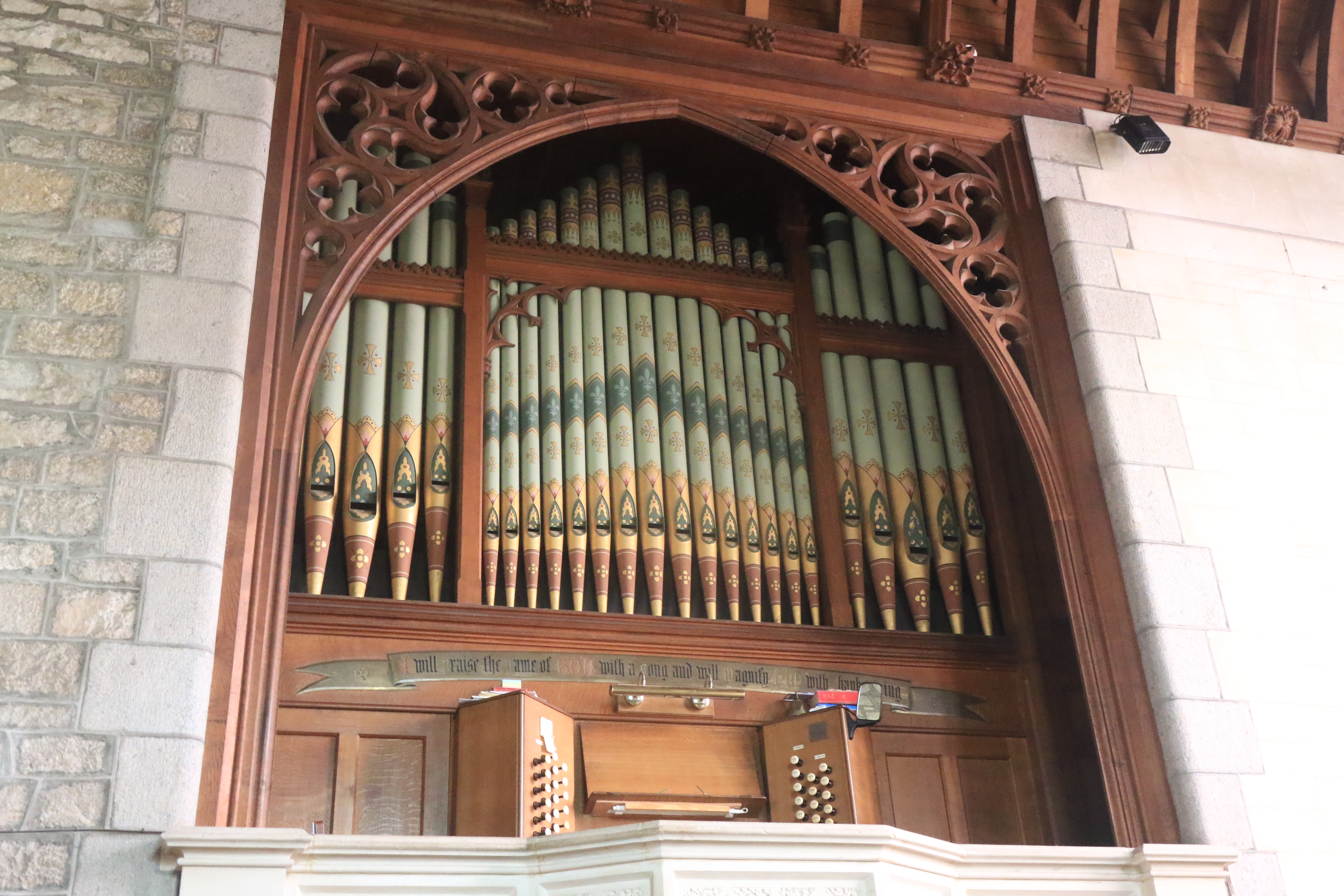
The organ of 1905

The organ was installed by Hele & Co of Plymouth in 1905 at a cost of £800 given in memory of Pauline Eugenie Tilby. The organ was opened on Thursday 15 June 1905 by Daniel Joseph Wood, organist of Exeter Cathedral. An electric blower was fitted in 1946.

It now comprises 3 manuals and 34 speaking stops. A specification of the organ can be found in the National Pipe Organ Register.

=== Organists ===
- George Osborne Brown 1854 – 1860
- Miss E.A. Treleaven 1860 – 1867
- Mr. Rihill 1867 – ca. 1871
- Miss Clack ???? – 1876 (daughter of the Rector)
- W. Sanders 1876 – 1877
- George Satterley 1877 – 1902
- A.E. Chapman 1902 – 1903 (afterwards organist at St Barnabas’ Church, Dartmouth)
- Miss Esther West
- A.W. Cooper 1906 – ???? (formerly organist at Lustleigh, and St Saviour's Cathedral, Pietermaritzburg, Natal).
- A. Theodore Sanger 1909 – 1913 (afterwards organist at Cathedral Church of the Redeemer Calgary)
- W.R. Weaver 1914 – 1916
- Irene Chudleigh 1916 – 1924
- W.R. Weaver 1924 – 1932
- Mr. Cross ca. 1934
- Keith Hortop Late 1970s (approx) – 1986
- Henry Brinkworth 1986 – 2007

== Bells ==
The tower contains a peal of 8 bells cast by Gillett & Johnston in 1922. They were dedicated by the Bishop of Exeter on 1 December 1922.
