= Church of St Mary the Virgin, Bickington =

Church of St Mary the Virgin
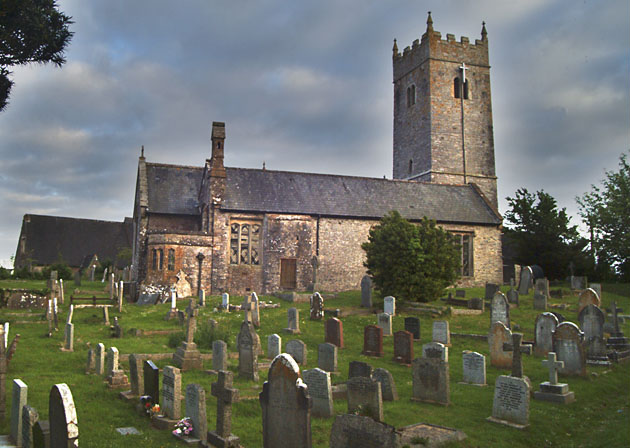
- North face of Bickington Village Church
- Church of St Mary the Virgin
- 50.5415°N 3.6953°W
- OS grid reference: SX 79970 72679
- Location: Bickington, Devon
- Country: England
- Denomination: Church of England

History
- Founded: 1443

Architecture
- Heritage designation: Listed Building Grade I

Administration
- Diocese: Exeter
- Parish: Ashburton St Andrew

The Church of St Mary the Virgin, in Bickington, Devon, England, dates from the fifteenth century. The church is part of the Ashburton benefice, of the Church of England Diocese of Exeter, and the building is Grade I listed.

== History ==
The church dates from the fifteenth century; it is first mentioned in the register of Bishop Lacey in 1420 when it was described as a daughter Church of Ashburton.

It is suspected the church is built on a pre-Norman Christian burial ground. The clues being the deviation of an old lane from Chipley to the moor which doglegs past the building, and the circular raised churchyard.

The present church was built in 1443, and the north aisle built in the 16th century; although there are references to an earlier church.

It is not known who financed the building of the church at Bickington. The only house with features of the period is East Burn although in both Herebere and Ramshorn we also find carved mantles, an indication of a fair amount of disposable wealth. These are very difficult to date precisely, but are similar to that found in Church House which is dated to around 1500. These are but possibilities. It is likely that Thomas Shabbetour and John Majour made their contribution to the building of the church, but the task, even in a small church such as Bickington's, called for a considerable amount of money.

In 1842 Bickington was constituted as a Parish by order in Council. However, in 1952 by order of the Church Commissioners the Parish was ecclesiastically reunited with Ashburton and the vicarage was sold. The church once again became a daughter Church of Ashburton in 2006.

The church was extensively restored in 1884 and the vicarage was built at the same time on the site of a fifteenth century Curate's house which was pulled down. The total cost of restoring the church and building the vicarage was £2,114.

The church itself is built of limestone and has an embattled tower of two stages complete with restored pinnacles a stair turret on the south side. All the exterior of the church and the whole of the south walls were renewed at the time of the restoration. The stalls were restored by Hems of Exeter and Harry Hems was responsible for most of the carving in the church including the lectern and credence table. The Reredos carving which is particularly worthy of note was designed by R. Medley Fulford of Exeter. It was a gift of the Reverend William Smith who was the vicar at this time (1887).

The screen was demolished in 1825 and only a few portions remain, some showing linen fold carving which was incorporated into the sedila on the south side and into the modern low screen and the choir stalls. The screen extends across the north chapel which is known as the "Wrigwell Pew". The Bickford family owned estates including Wrigwell in Bickington for 600 years and many memorials to the family can be seen around the church.

The building was recorded as Grade I listed in 1955.

== Lych gate ==
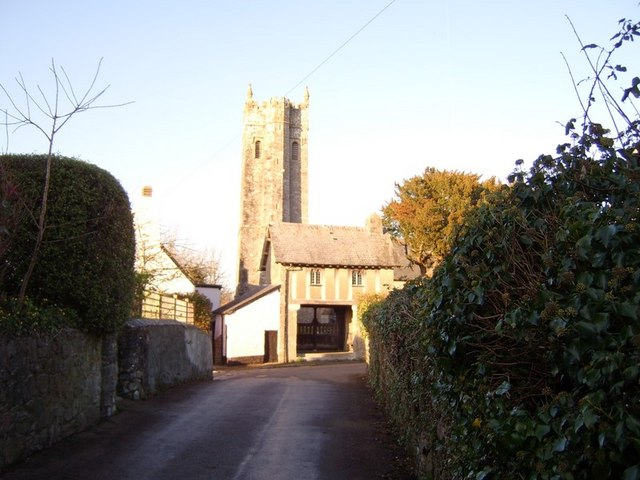
Lychgate as seen approaching from the Barton

The 15th-century lych gate on the south side was rebuilt in 1901. It was designed by the Reverend R. M. Fulford to resemble as near as possible the original gate; the carved beams of the wooden structure were retained but all the rest was replaced.

On the east side of the gate is a small chamber on the ground floor, whilst the upper floor is approached by a flight of steps. This room has been used variously to house two of the poor of the parish, as a changing room for the priest-in-charge when he came from Ashburton, as a meeting room by the Mothers Union, a meeting place for the Parochial Church Council, a venue for the youth club and as a cobbler's shop.

== Bells ==
Of the church bells Ellacombe recorded "In 1553 there were at Beckunton 111 belles in the tower”.

Two of the bells were recast in the seventeenth century and all the bells were overhauled in 1960 and retuned, quarter turned and rehung in a new wooden frame with new fittings for the hand chimes, this was done by John Taylor of Loughborough. The fifth tenor bell has a crowned headstock.

- Tenor Bell - Scobell Nicholas Harell Church Warden 1664
- Fifth Bell - Soli DeoDevtr Gloria I.P. Exon 1664
- Fourth Bell - Cast by John Warner and Sons 1774 and recast in 1888 W Smith Vicar.
- Third Bell - AD 1887
- Second Bell - Cast by John Warner. London 1888 W. Smith Vicar.
- Treble Bell - Cast by Mears and Stainbank, P H 0 Presbyter 1906–1908.
