= Hams, Chudleigh =

Historic estate in Devon, England

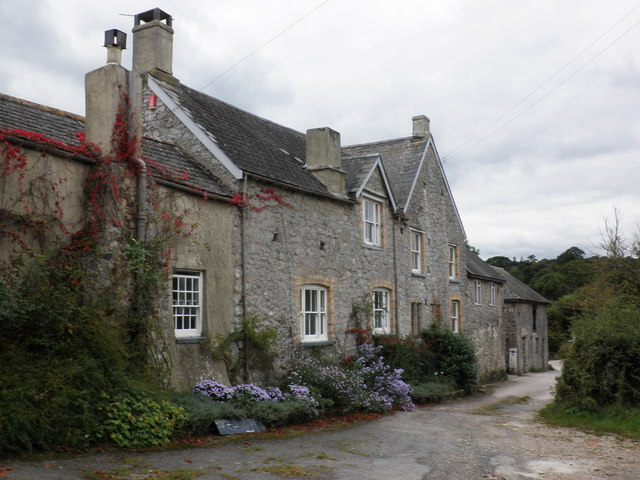
Hams Barton in 2009

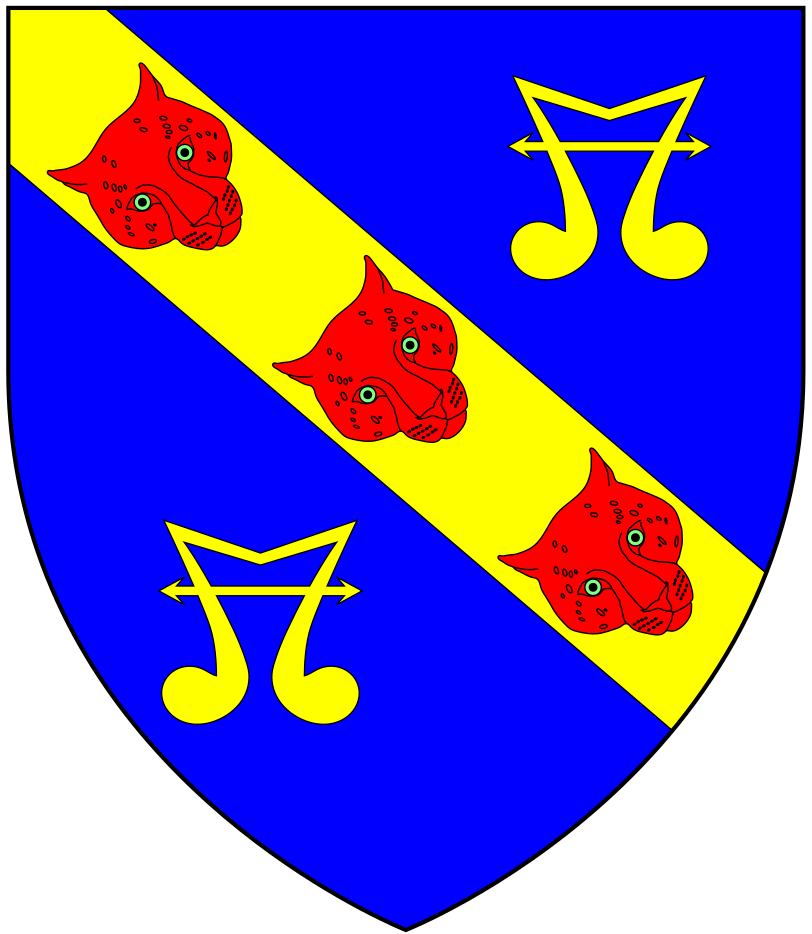
Arms of Hunt: Azure, on a bend between two water bougets or three leopard's faces gules

Hams is an historic estate situated within the parish of Chudleigh in Devon. The surviving remnant of the former mansion house of the Hunt family, known as Hams Barton is a grade II* listed building, situated one mile north-east of the town of Chudleigh, near Kate Brook.

== History ==
The Hunt family was settled at Hams before the reign of Queen Elizabeth I (1558-1603). Thomas Hunt (d.1548) was thrice Mayor of Exeter, including in 1517 and 1537. The last entry of the name in the Parish Register is the burial of Thomas Hunt in 1730. According to the Devonshire historian Polwhele: "Hams was an estate of very considerable extent when in possession of the Hunts". It afterwards belonged to the Inglett family (later Fortescue-Inglett) of Buckland Filleigh, who sold it to a certain Mr Beech, who sold it to Sir Robert Palk, 1st Baronet (1717-1798) of Haldon House in the parish of Kenn, Devon. It was sold by Palk to Charles Clifford, 6th Baron Clifford of Chudleigh (1759–1831), of Ugbrooke within the parish of Chudleigh, and in 1852 belonged to his son Hugh Clifford, 7th Baron Clifford of Chudleigh (1790–1858). Hams was originally a large Elizabethan structure, approached by an avenue. In 1852 it had descended in status to a farm house, situated in a court, and surrounded by a few chestnut trees. The principal doorway and several others are arched and made of granite. The ceilings of some of the rooms are supported by oak beams, smoothed and jointed and in 1852 the windows were "of the ancient form, some of them are now blocked up or modernized". A fine banquetting room survives, called by Pevsner "the sumptuous first-floor great chamber, one of the best of its date in the county", with fireplace overmantle inscribed with the date "1621" and displaying the arms of Hunt (Azure, on a bend between two water bougets or three leopard's faces gules) impaling Meredith commemorating the marriage of Bennett Hunt (1573-1643), Mayor of Exeter, and Elizabeth Meredith (d.1659), a daughter of Thomas Meredith of Slapton. The Bennett family at that time resided at nearby Whiteway. On the opposite wall are the royal arms. The couple's mural monument survives in Chudleigh Church inscribed: "Here lyeth the body of Bennett Hunt of Hams, in this p'ish, esqr. who was buried ye first day of July, Anno Dom. 1643, aged 70 years. Also the body of Elizabeth Hunt, the wife of Bennett Hunt, was buried the 2d day of November, 1659. Also the body of Nicholas Hunt, son of Bennett Hunt, was buried the 19h day of October, 1639, aged 22 years. Also the body of Frances, ye wife of John Hunt of Hams, esqr. was buried the 26h day of March, 1672." Other monuments to the family also survive in the church.
