= Ashton, Devon =

Coordinates: 50.65°N 3.616667°W

Higher Ashton
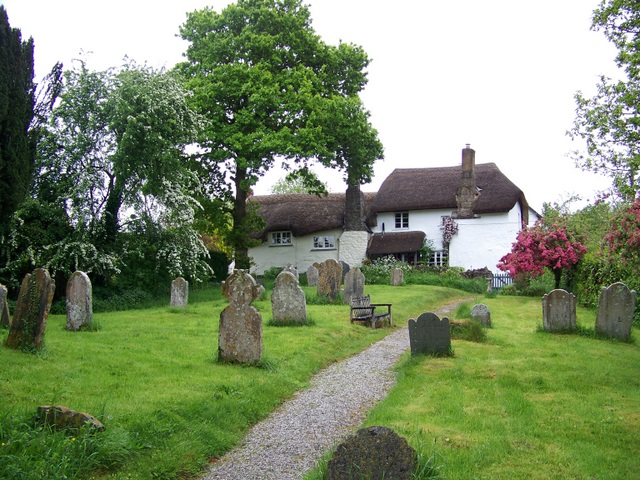
- Cottages viewed from the graveyard of the church of St John the Baptist

- Location within Devon
- Population: 203 (2011 Census)
- Civil parish: Ashton
- District: Teignbridge
- Shire county: Devon
- Region: South West
- Country: England
- Sovereign state: United Kingdom
- Post town: Exeter
- Postcode district: EX6
- Police: Devon and Cornwall
- Fire: Devon and Somerset
- Ambulance: South Western

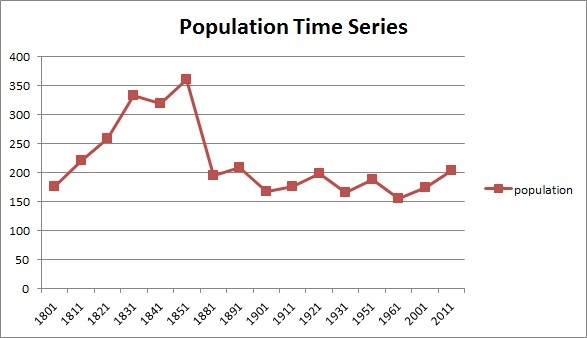
Total population of Ashton civil parish, Devon, as reported by the Census of Population from 1801 to 2011.

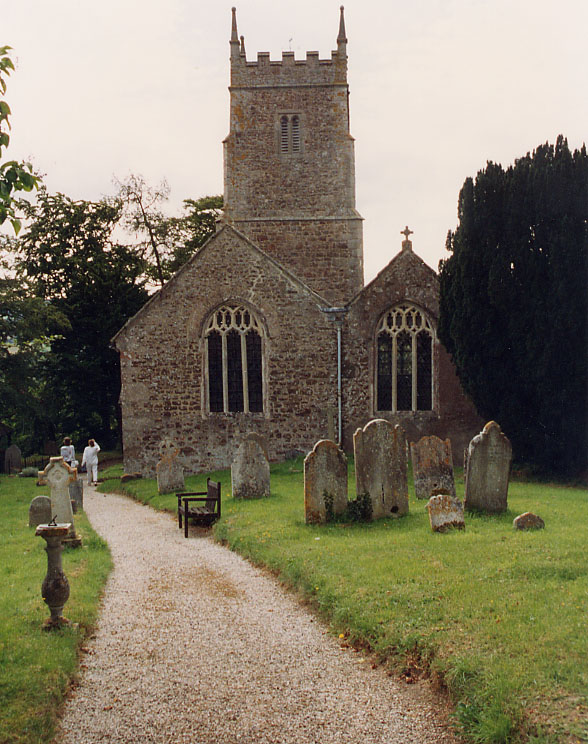
Outside view of St John the Baptist's church

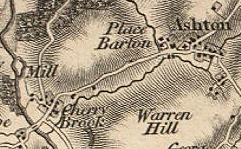
Historical map exert from 1809 Ordnance Survey map of Ashton

Ashton is a civil parish in the Teignbridge district of Devon, England. According to the 2001 census it had a population of 174, and it had a population of 203 according to the 2011 census. The parish consists of two villages, Higher Ashton and Lower Ashton, and is on the edge of the Dartmoor National Park. The France Brook flows through most of Ashton just south of its main road, and along Ashton's eastern boundary flows the River Teign. The parish is located approximately 13 km north of Newton Abbot, and roughly 10 km to the south west of its nearest city, Exeter. Historically, Ashton has primarily been based inside the agricultural sector, but one of its most notifiable landmarks is the St John the Baptists church located in the Higher Ashton district.

In 1887, John Bartholomew's Gazetteer of the British Isles described Ashton as:

"Ashton, par. with ry. sta., E. Devon, 4 miles N. of Chudleigh, 1709 ac., pop. 195."

== History ==
The manor was long the seat of the Chudleigh family, from about 1320 to 1745, which originated at the manor of Chudleigh, 3 miles south of Ashton, and for which was created the Chudleigh baronetcy in 1622. It was Sir George Chudleigh who was the 1st Baronet during the English Civil War and sided with Parliament first and then with the Royalists later on. Ashton became the birthplace of a long line of Chudleigh family members.

== Geography ==
In relation to London, Ashton is approximately 176 miles to the south west. Typically, Ashton's height above sea level is around 100m, but this varies as along the main road the elevation is lower in general. The majority of urban land in Ashton lies near to the France Brook river through the middle of Ashton, but directly north and south of the main road that follows the river are two small hills of elevated land. The majority of the geology of the land is built up from Permian breccias, sandstones and volcanics, but small amounts of greensand and gault can also be found nearby. Most of Ashton's residential land is located in the Lower Ashton area, near or behind the Manor Inn, but the church, great barn and a few cottages are located in Higher Ashton.

== Demography ==
According to the census reports for Ashton, the largest increase in population since 1801 occurred in 1831 with an increase of population of 75 over the previous 10 years. The largest decline in population occurred over a timescale of 30 years with a total population 165 people less than the last report 30 years beforehand. The gender ratios have stayed almost consistent since 1801, with the number of males generally 10-20% higher than that of the female residence. Anomalies to this pattern include the year 1801, where the number of males was 111, yet the number of females was nearly half that at 65. The only years where there has been a greater number of female residents are 1881 by a value of 1, and 1951 by a value of 7. The reported area of the parish in acres has expanded with time starting at 1,560 in 1831 and increasing to 1,709 by 1851. By 1891 this changed to a value of 2,182 and since stayed constant through to 1961.

== Economy ==
Historically, Ashton appears to have primarily been an agriculturally focused area as according to the 1831 census the number of males over 20 in labor based occupation was 41, and the number of males defined under Middling sorts was 27, which covers 76.40% of the overall male population over 20 that was in occupation at the time. At this time, Middling sorts was defined as middle class, normally small scale farmers not employing their own workers or those with the skills of manufacturing or handcrafting. However, since the census data for occupational categories shows us that 57 workers were into agriculture and 15 into handicraft and there has only been records of farmhouses and large areas of farmland on the land of Ashton it is most likely that these middle class workers owned their own farmland. The record of 21 employers and professionals in Ashton in 1831 therefore were most likely upper class land owners employing the laborers to work the land.

According to the 1881 census of occupational structure, 72% or 39 out of 54 males were working in agriculture which largely dominated the workforce of Ashton, with the next highest category workers in mineral substances at 5 male workers. For the female occupational structure of Ashton at this time, 76% or 44 out of 58 females were unemployed, with the next highest category being domestic services or offices with 9 female workers.

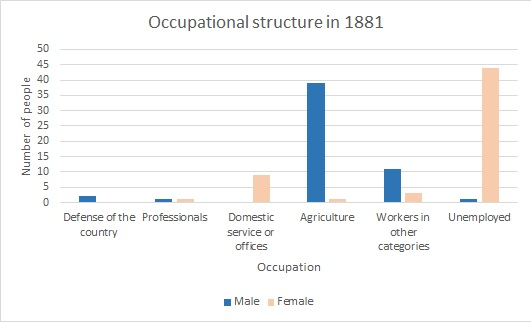
Bar chart showing the numbers of male and female occupants into different classes of occupation in 1881 in Ashton

Currently in Ashton according to the 2011 census, the amount of those of working age between 16 and 74 in employment is 101 people. Of these, only 18 are classed as managers, directors or senior officials. 29 people are in to professional occupations covering health, teaching, business, media and work in the public sector. Only 15 people are classified as working in skilled trade, and only 9 of these people are in agricultural based work. In direct comparison to the 1831 census it is clear to see Ashton has broken away from its agricultural background and has become much more balanced in its economy.

== Landmarks ==
Approximately 140m east of the church is The Great Barn of Devon. The structure itself is approximately 23 meters long and 7 meters wide, and whilst no longer used for any agricultural purposes the barn does provide a social aspect for the community and nearby locations as now its primary function is hosting wedding ceremonies. The barn was previously derelict and it wasn't until September 2004 that the barn was reconstructed through private business investments. Just under a kilometer east down the road small businesses such as Oxen Park Farm and Cunnington D&A post office can be found in the district of Lower Ashton, and like the Great Barn the Manor inn has only been recently constructed in June 2008, again from independent investment suggesting that local businesses in Ashton have been growing slowly since 2000.

== Notable people ==
- Chudleigh baronets (1662-1745)
- Gladys Calthrop (1894–1980), an artist and leading British stage designer.
