= Woodland, Devon =

Hamlet in Devon, England

Coordinates: 50.503°N 3.709°W

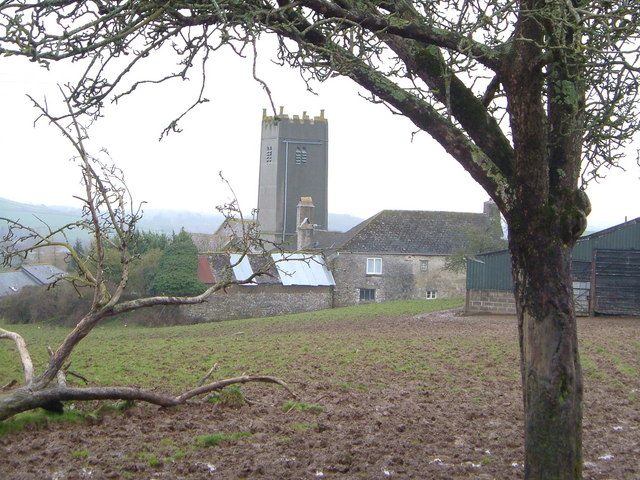
View of the village from the west, with Higher Woodland Farm and St John's church

Woodland is a small hamlet and civil parish in Teignbridge, Devon, England. The parish lies just east of the town of Ashburton; the hamlet is about 2.25 miles (3.6 km) from the town.
