= Broadhempston =

Village in Devon, England

Coordinates: 50°29′N 3°41′W

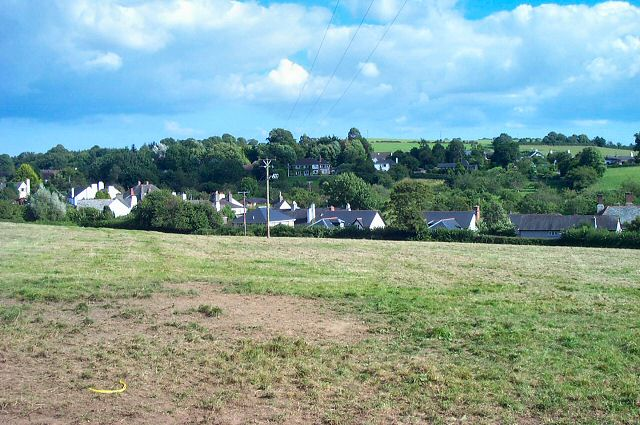
- Broadhempston
- Population: 641 (2001)
- OS grid reference: SX8066
- Civil parish: Broadhempston
- District: Teignbridge
- Shire county: Devon
- Region: South West
- Country: England
- Sovereign state: United Kingdom
- Post town: TOTNES
- Postcode district: TQ9
- Dialling code: 01803
- Police: Devon and Cornwall
- Fire: Devon and Somerset
- Ambulance: South Western
- UK Parliament: Newton Abbot

Broadhempston (alias Broad Hempston, anciently Great Hempston, Hempston Cauntelow) is a village, parish and former manor in Devon, England, situated about 4 miles north of Totnes. It is now administered by Teignbridge District Council. According to the 2001 census the parish contained 257 houses with a population of 641.

== Description ==
The village contains a parish church, a primary school, two public houses (the Monk's Retreat and the Coppa Dolla) and a shop/post office. The working population mainly commutes to the neighbouring town of Torquay, and to the cities of Exeter and Plymouth, including many who work in the medical sector.

Many of the villagers are "incomers" and now outnumber "natives". The proportion of professional and managerial grade employees resident in the parish is higher than the national average for comparable sized areas. House ownership levels, as a measure of prosperity, is also high. Until recently there were five farmhouses and yards within the village itself, but these have been converted to residential uses. A "Community Woodland” has public access for pedestrians and is widely used for leisure as well as a community educational resource.

=== Notable buildings ===
- Parish church of St Peter and St Paul, which has a 13th-century chancel with 15th-century arcades, beams and bosses. The fine chancel screen is ancient, although the top part was made in 1903. The baptismal font is 15th century. Giles Hussey, artist and theorist, is buried in the churchyard.
- The 15th-century almshouse is now an inn.
- Village Hall, recently rebuilt to cater for all age groups from the village and surrounding areas.

== Manor ==
The manor is listed in the Domesday Book of 1086 as Hamistone and was held by Robert, Count of Mortain, 2nd Earl of Cornwall. It was later held successively by the families of Cantilupe (from whom it became known as Hempston Cauntelow), West, Rowe, Martin, Champion, Duntze and Tozer.
