= Bickington =

Village and civil parish in Devon, England

Coordinates: 50°32′N 3°42′W

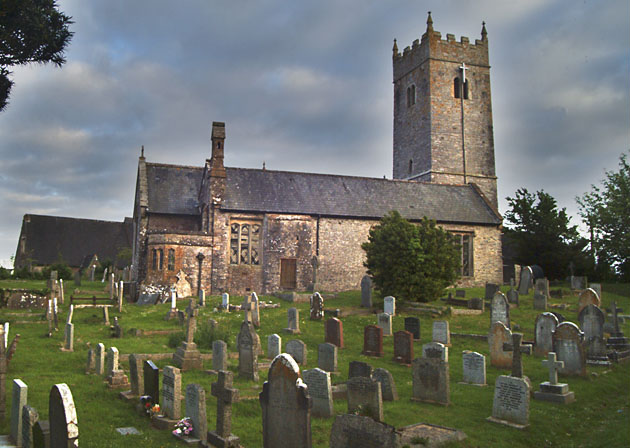
- Church of St Mary the Virgin, Bickington

- Location within Devon
- Population: 311 (2001 census)
- Civil parish: Bickington
- District: Teignbridge
- Shire county: Devon
- Region: South West
- Country: England
- Sovereign state: United Kingdom

Bickington is a village and civil parish in the Teignbridge district of Devon, England, on the east edge of the Dartmoor National Park. At the 2001 census it had a population of 311. The village is about five miles west of Newton Abbot, on the River Lemon. The church is 15th century but was built on the site of an earlier church; its lychgate has a room over it.

The village was historically known as "Bichentone" or "Buketon". Whilst it was previously a manor, the manorial estate was "dismembered" (dissolved and split between neighbouring manors), likely sometime in the 16th century.

The primary landowners were the Bickford family, who by 1850 had owned estates in Bickington, including their main seat in the area Wrigwell, for over 600 years. Many memorials to the family can be seen in the church.

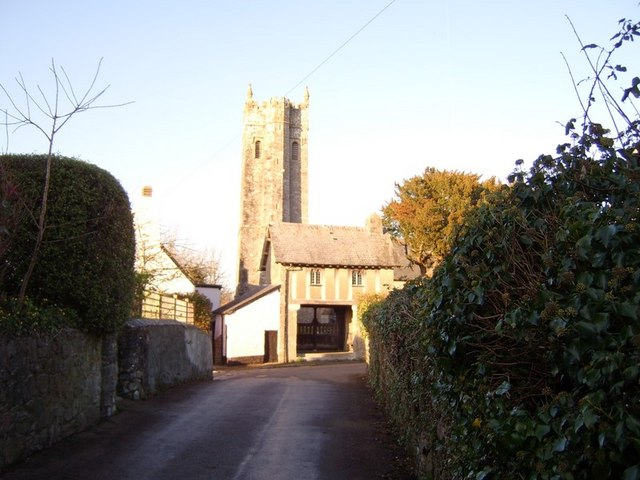
Church and lychgate, Bickington

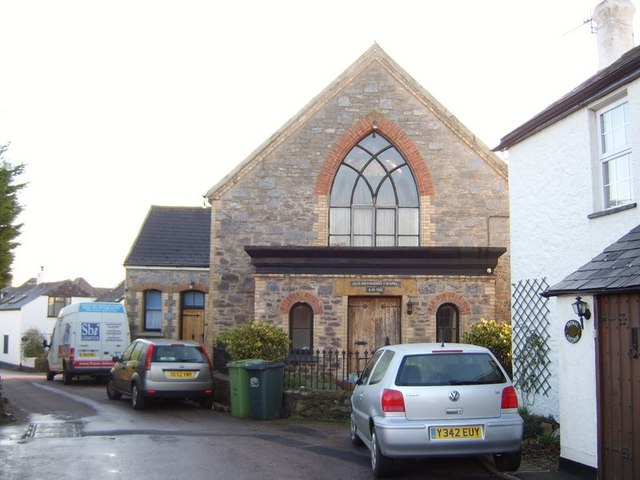
Bickington Methodist church

== Amenities ==
- Church of St Mary the Virgin (Church of England – Grade I listed)
- Village Hall
- Public House (Dartmoor Half Way Inn)
- Camp site
- Common land (Ramshorn Down)
- Farm shop (Granny Pat's)
- Picnic area

== In media ==
The village appeared on the BBC's Countryfile programme in November 2017, where its apparent decline was the subject of the feature. Local media expanded on the BBC feature.

A book about Bickington, The Book of Bickington, was published in 2000.
