= Higher Ashton =

Village in Devon, England

- Village
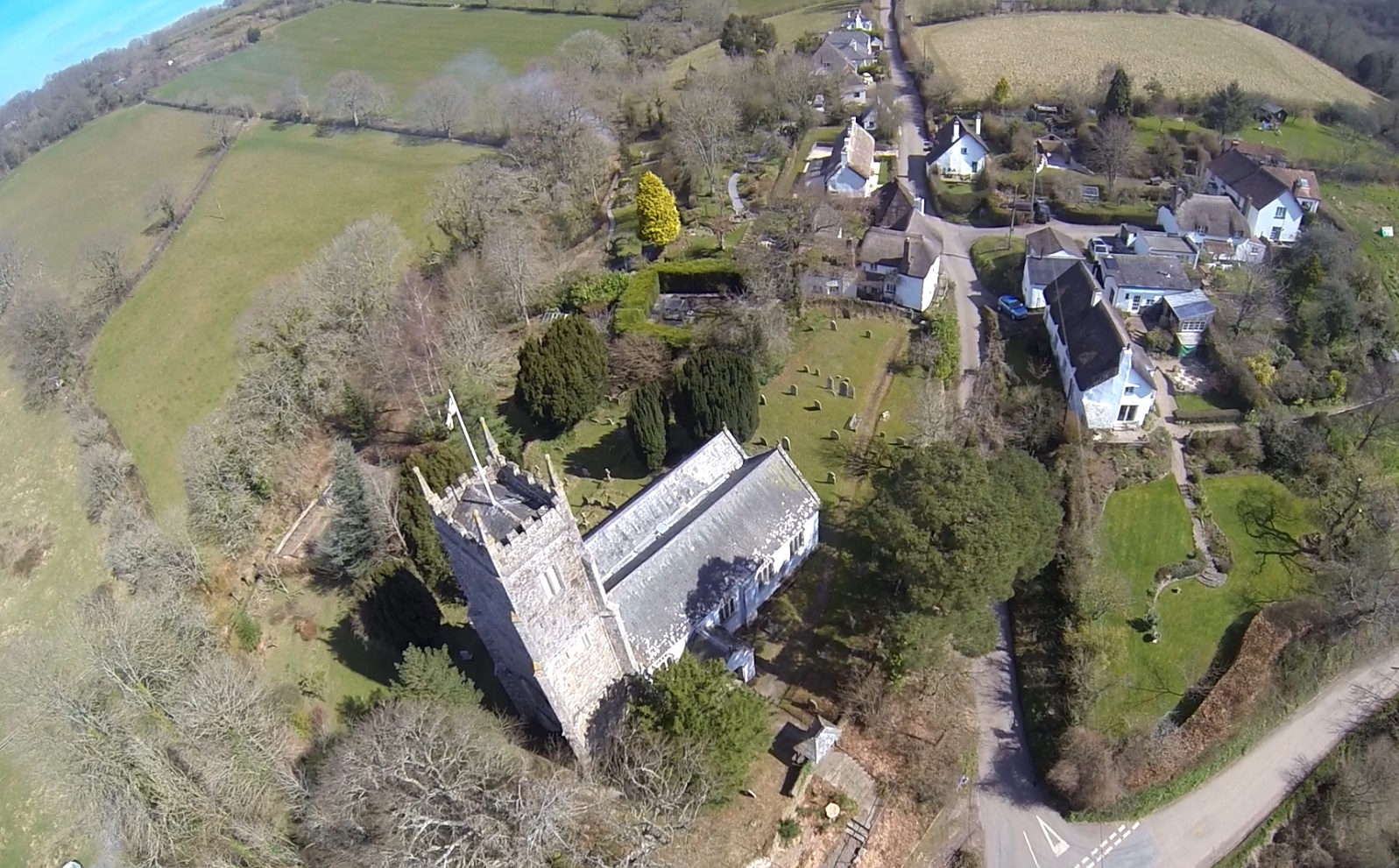
- Higher Ashton

- Location within Devon Location within the United Kingdom
- Coordinates: 50°39′02″N 3°37′09″W
- Country: England
- County: Devon
- Parish: Ashton

Population (2001)
  - Total: 174
- Time zone: UTC+0:00 (GST)

Higher Ashton is a village in the countryside between Haldon Hills and the Teign Valley in Devon, England. Along with Lower Ashton it is part of the civil parish of Ashton, which in 2001 had a population of 174.

It features remains of the Chudleigh family manor whose most complete surviving range has been converted into the house Place Barton.

The church of St John the Baptist in Higher Ashton is well known for its intricately carved medieval rood screen with painted saints. It also has an Elizabethan pulpit. The fifteenth-century font still has a bar to lock it against witchcraft. Other fifteenth-century features are the benches and some stained glass.
