= Dunsford =

Village in Devon, England

Coordinates: 50.690°N 3.682°W

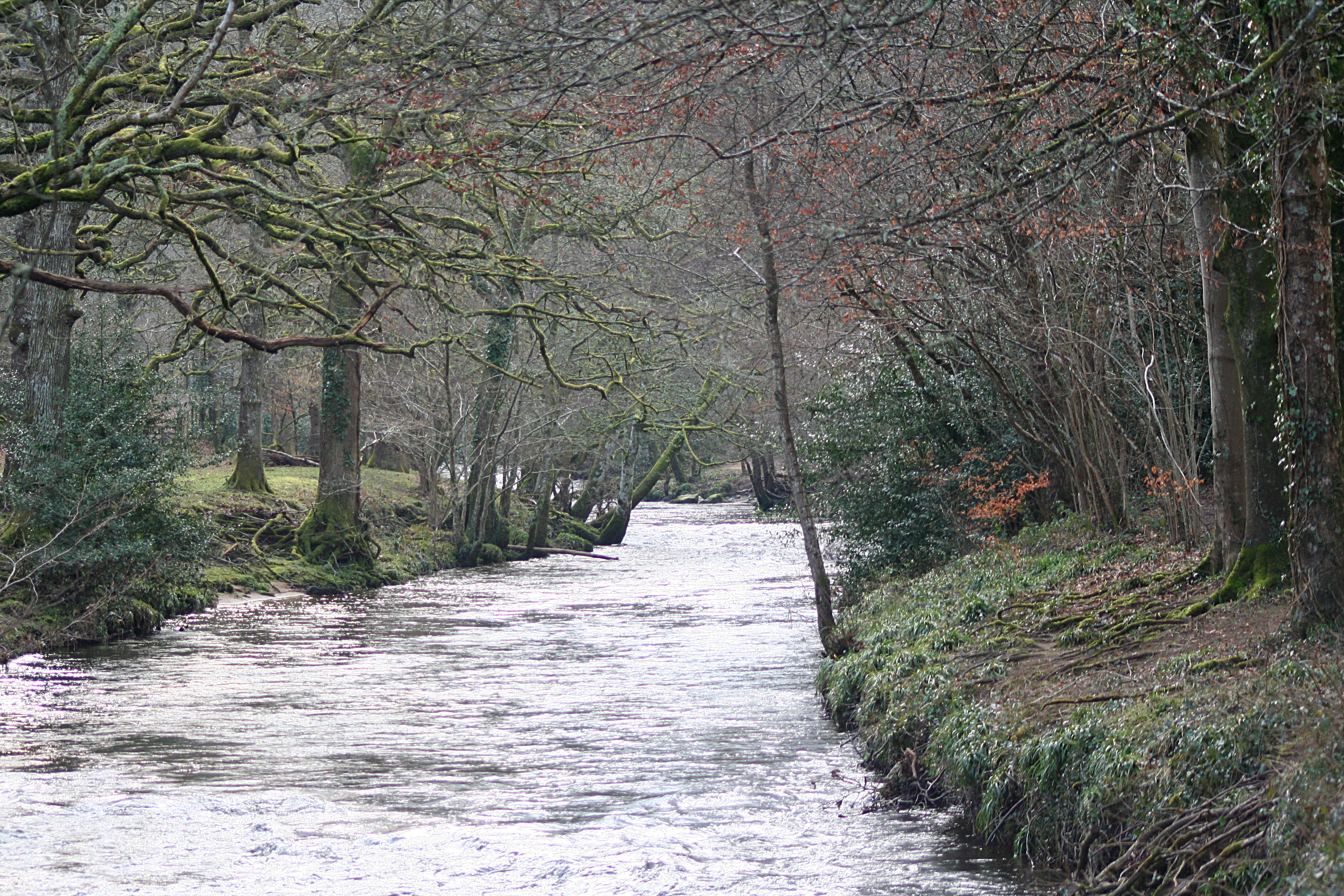
- The river Teign, as it passes through Dunsford Nature Reserve

- Location within Devon
- Population: 688
- OS grid reference: SX813892
- Civil parish: Dunsford
- District: Teignbridge
- Shire county: Devon
- Region: South West
- Country: England
- Sovereign state: United Kingdom
- Post town: EXETER
- Postcode district: EX6
- Police: Devon and Cornwall
- Fire: Devon and Somerset
- Ambulance: South Western
- UK Parliament: Central Devon

Dunsford is a village in Devon, England; it is located just inside the Dartmoor National Park. The hamlet of Butts is sited about one mile to the west; it generally considered to be part of the village, as is Reedy, which is a similar distance to the east.

== History ==
The place name is first attested in the Domesday Book of 1086, where it appears as Dunesforda, meaning 'Dunn's ford'.

The village has a number of traditional thatched cottages; a primary school which has a swimming pool, climbing wall and sports field; one village shop and post office; a tea room and a public house. St Mary's Church, built between 1420 and 1455, is located in the village centre.

Dunsford Halt was a station on the Teign Valley Line from Exeter St Thomas to Heathfield station that served the village from 1928 to 1958.

Great Fulford House lies to the west of Dunsford; a Domesday manor which has been the home of the Fulford family since at least 1190. The present house was mainly built in the early 16th century and is a semi-fortified mansion house built round a central courtyard. It was the backdrop to the 2014 reality-television programme, Life Is Toff.

== Geography ==
Dunsford Woods nature reserve is nearby, which is managed by Devon Wildlife Trust; it consists of 57 hectares of river valley woodland, heath-covered rocky slopes and fertile flood-plain scrub and grassland. It is known especially for its wild daffodils and six species of fritillary butterfly.

== Events ==
Dunsford holds a village show at the beginning of July every year. Dunsford Amateur Dramatic Society (DADS) produces a pantomime in the village hall in early January. The villagers also hold an annual fancy dress pancake race in the streets.

== Twin towns – sister cities ==
Dunsford along with Doddiscombsleigh is twinned with:

- Fresney-le-Puceux, Boulon & Saint-Laurent-de-Condel, France, United Kingdom
