= Chudleigh =

Town in Devon, England

Coordinates: 50.604°N 3.605°W

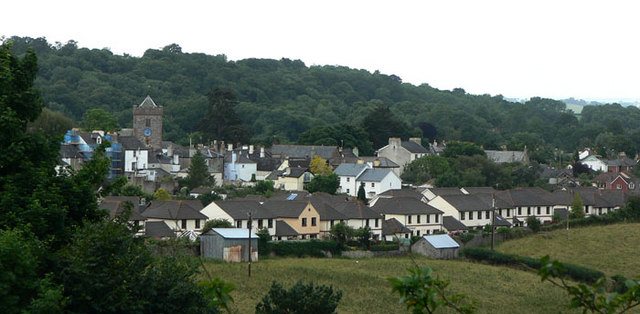
- Chudleigh

- Location within Devon
- Population: 4,586 (2021 census)
- OS grid reference: SX865795
- District: Teignbridge
- Shire county: Devon
- Region: South West
- Country: England
- Sovereign state: United Kingdom
- Post town: NEWTON ABBOT
- Postcode district: TQ13
- Dialling code: 01626
- Police: Devon and Cornwall
- Fire: Devon and Somerset
- Ambulance: South Western
- UK Parliament: Central Devon

Chudleigh (/ˈtʃʌdli/) is an ancient wool town located within the Teignbridge District Council area of Devon, England; it is sited between Newton Abbot and Exeter. The electoral ward with the same name had a population of 5,919 at the 2021 census, however, that also includes the neighbouring village of Chudleigh Knighton.

The name Chudleigh is derived from either the Old English cieddalēah meaning 'Ciedda's wood or clearing', or cēodlēah meaning 'bag wood or clearing', probably referring to a hollow.

== Geography ==
Chudleigh is located in the Teign Valley and is close to the edge of Dartmoor. Nearby Castle Dyke is an Iron Age hillfort which demonstrates far earlier settlement in the area. It is also near to Haldon Forest, a Forestry Commission property. The town has been bypassed by the A38 road since 1972.

== Great Fire of Chudleigh ==
Chudleigh Rebuilding Act 1808
- Act of Parliament
- Parliament of the United Kingdom
- Long title: An Act for the better and more easy rebuilding of the Town of Chudleigh, in the County of Devon; for determining Differences touching Houses demolished by the late Fire there; and for preventing future Danger by Fire.
- Citation: 48 Geo. 3. c. lxxxix

Dates
- Royal assent: 1 June 1808

Text of statute as originally enacted

The weather conditions in Devon in the year 1807 have been described as a drought. Weeks without rain left many people short of water and had farmers worrying about their crops. At around noon on 22 May, a small fire broke out in a pile of furze stacked near the ovens at a bakery in Culver Street (now New Exeter Street). According to later reports, the staff in the bakery seemed unaware of the danger this posed, but the fire, fed by the exceptionally dry fuel, exploded. In the shortest time imaginable, the fire had spread to the roof of the bakery (thatched, as were 90% of the houses in Chudleigh at the time) and huge hunks of burning reed and straw were swept aloft by a rapidly growing north-easterly wind. The fire destroyed around 180 of the 300 houses in the town.

== Parish church ==
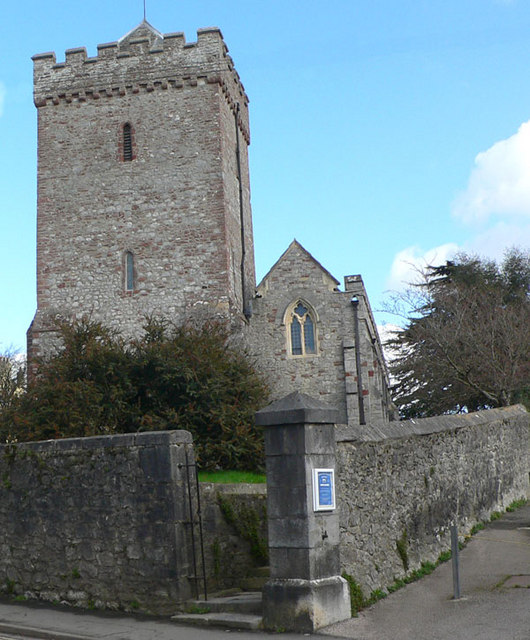
Chudleigh church

The church of St Martin and St Mary was consecrated in 1259. The structure is medieval but was heavily restored in 1868. The rood screen has paintings of saints and prophets and the Courtenay family coat of arms.

In 1887, St Bridget's Abbey of Syon built a monastery, known as Chudleigh Abbey, which they occupied until 1925.

== Town hall ==
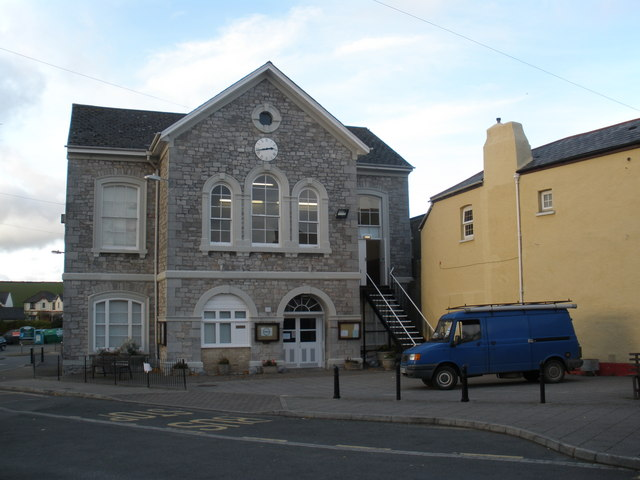
Chudleigh Town Hall

Chudleigh Town Hall, which was designed in the Italianate style, dates from 1865.

== Historic estates ==
Various historic estates are situated in the parish of Chudleigh, including:

=== Ugbrooke House ===
Property of the Clifford family since 1604, Ugbrooke is an important stately house and family seat of the Barons Clifford of Chudleigh (a title created in 1672).

=== Whiteway ===
Whiteway House is a Grade II* listed Georgian house set in parkland 2 1/2 miles north of Chudleigh, at the foot of the Haldon Hills, built in the 1770s by John Parker, 1st Baron Boringdon (1735–1788) of Saltram House, Plympton, Devon.

=== Hams ===
Hams Barton is a grade II* listed building, formerly the seat of the Hunt family, situated one-mile north-east of the town, near Kate Brook. The Hunt family was settled there before the reign of Queen Elizabeth I (1558–1603). Thomas Hunt (d.1548) was thrice Mayor of Exeter, including in 1517 and 1537. A fine banqueting room survives, called by Pevsner "the sumptuous first-floor great chamber, one of the best of its date in the county". Several monuments to the Hunt family survive in the Hunt Aisle in Chudleigh church.

== Chudleigh Carnival ==
The Chudleigh Carnival is an annual week-long community festival, usually during the second week of July. In its modern format, the carnival dates back to 1973 and is organised by the volunteer Chudleigh Carnival Committee to raise funds for local community causes and charities.

The carnival week includes a range of community events, notably the Chudleigh Carnival Road Race (a 6-mile road race and fun run), family activities, and live music performances. The week concludes on Saturday with a parade along Fore Street, featuring floats, costume processions, marching bands, and participants from the wider South Devon carnival circuit.

After a three-year hiatus from 2020 to 2022 due to the COVID-19 pandemic, the event returned in July 2023.

== Climate ==
Climate data for Chudleigh, 1981–2010 normals
Month	Jan	Feb	Mar	Apr	May	Jun	Jul	Aug	Sep	Oct	Nov	Dec	Year
Mean daily maximum °C (°F)	8 (46)	8 (46)	10 (50)	13 (55)	16 (61)	19 (66)	21 (70)	21 (70)	18 (64)	15 (59)	11 (52)	9 (48)	14 (57)
Mean daily minimum °C (°F)	2 (36)	2 (36)	3 (37)	4 (39)	7 (45)	10 (50)	12 (54)	11 (52)	9 (48)	7 (45)	4 (39)	3 (37)	6 (43)
Average precipitation mm (inches)	110.0 (4.33)	83.9 (3.30)	80.5 (3.17)	63.2 (2.49)	66.1 (2.60)	56.1 (2.21)	57.0 (2.24)	62.9 (2.48)	69.5 (2.74)	108.6 (4.28)	104.8 (4.13)	121.8 (4.80)	984.4 (38.77)
Source: Chelsa Climate

== See also ==
- Stokelake – School in Devon, England
