= Devon heraldry =

Arms of English families from Devon

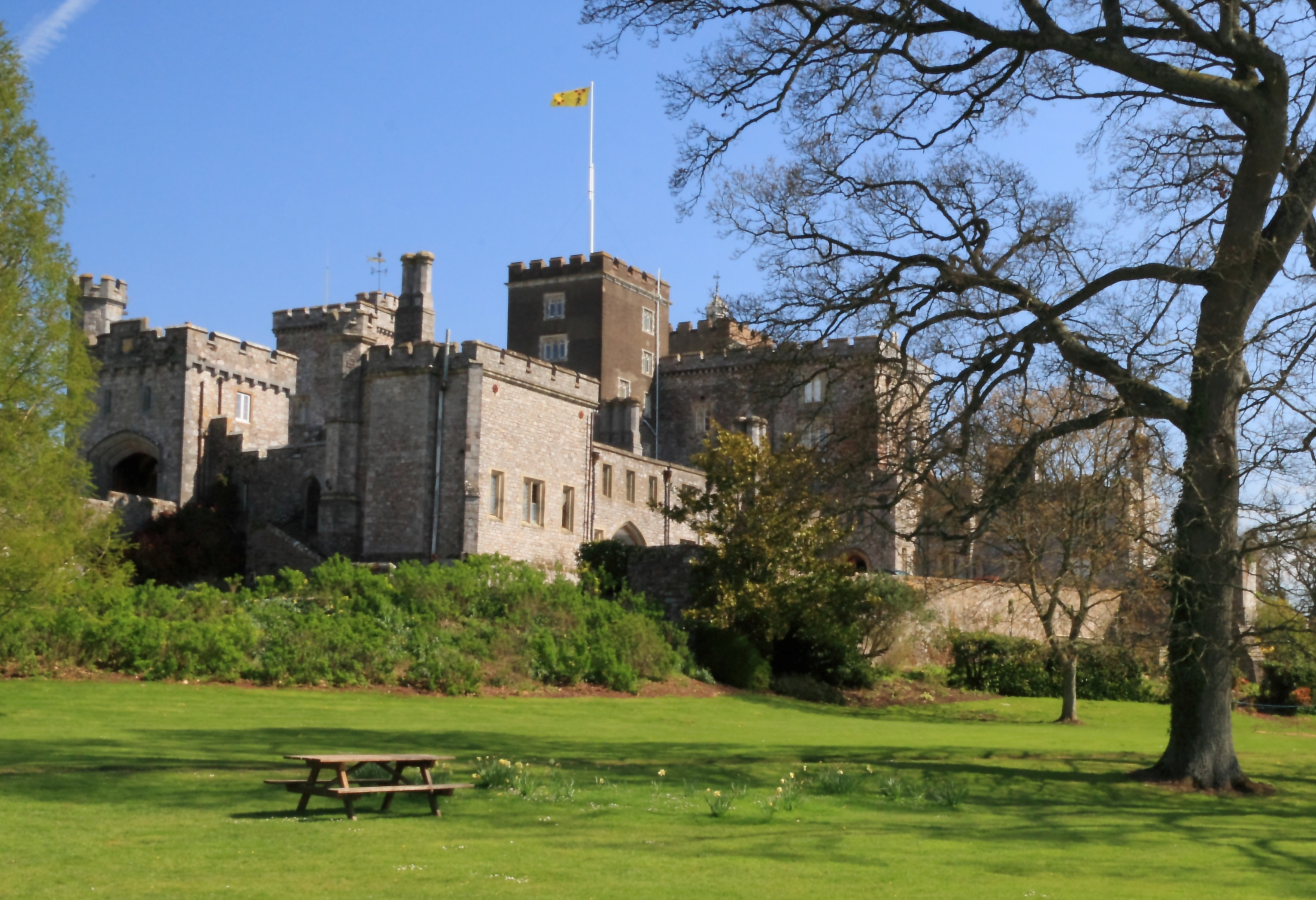
The arms of Courtenay on display above Powderham Castle in Devon in 2015, a seat of that family since the 14th century

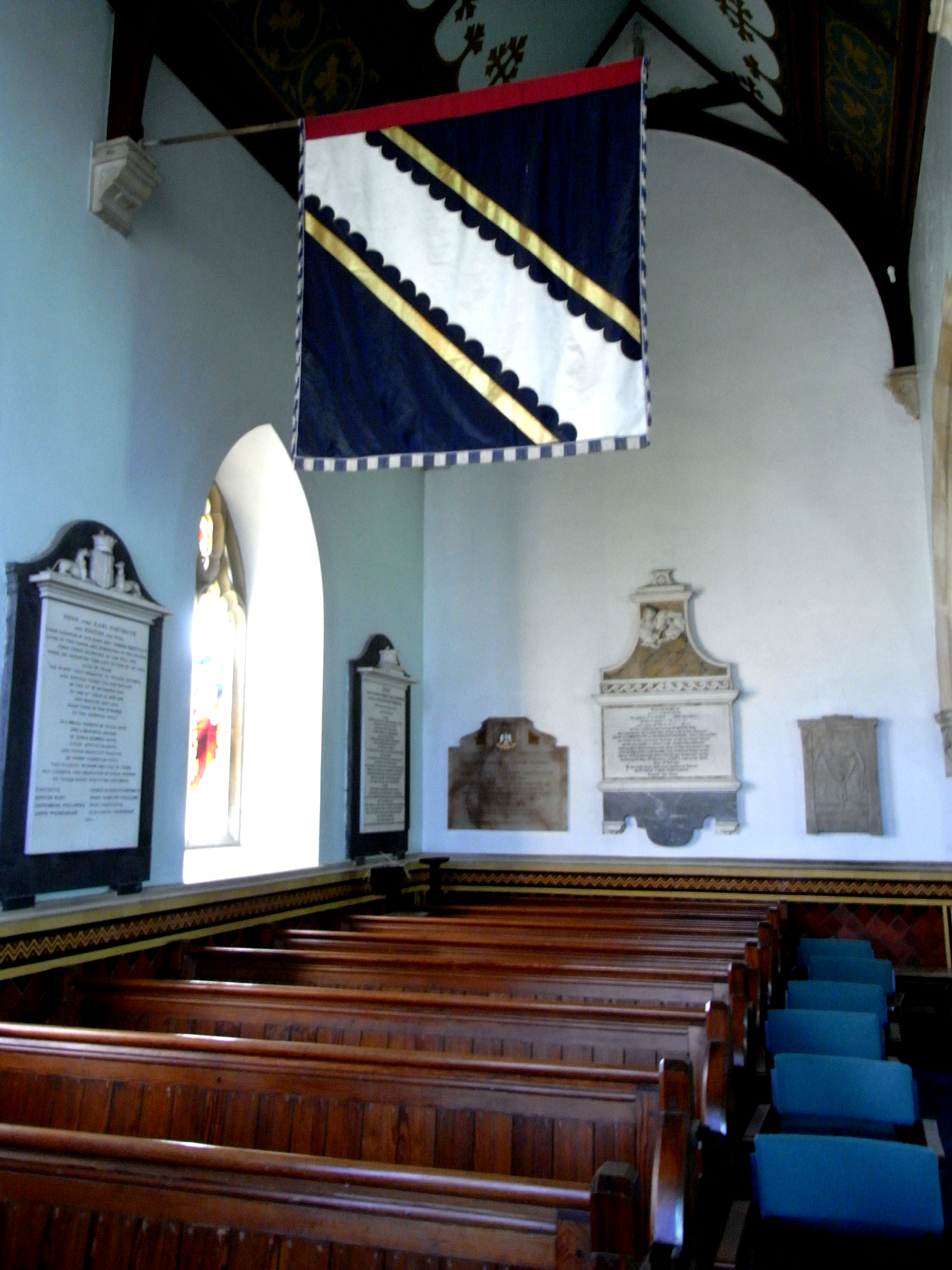
Fortescue banner of arms in the Fortescue Chapel of St Paul's Church, Filleigh, Devon.

The landed gentry and nobility of Devonshire, like the rest of the English and European gentry, bore heraldic arms from the start of the age of heraldry circa 1200–1215. The fashion for the display of heraldry ceased about the end of the Victorian era (1901) by which time most of the ancient arms-bearing families of Devonshire had died out, moved away or parted with their landed estates.

In the 21st century, a very few ancient families remain in the county represented by direct male descendants, including Courtenay of Powderham, Fulford of Fulford, Kelly of Kelly, Cruwys of Cruwys Morchard, Clifford of Chudleigh, Acland of Killerton and Broadclyst, Wrey of Tawstock. A few ancient Devon estates are still owned by descendants via female lines, for example Castle Hill, Filleigh, Molland, Incledon, Braunton, Hall, Bishop's Tawton, Newnham Park. In most cases, the laws of English heraldry preclude the transmission of paternal arms via a female heiress (other than in the form of quartering), thus most of these inheritors via female lines bring their own paternal heraldry to the estates inherited.

For example, the Irish arms of Gore (Earl of Arran) are now associated with Castle Hill, Filleigh, until 1958 the seat of the last male representative of the Fortescue family, which originated in Devon in the 12th century. In a few cases, however, male heirs via female lines have been required by the legator to seek royal licence to adopt his own arms and surname, otherwise destined to disappearance, in lieu of the legatees own. This was the case with the families most notably of Rolle, Basset, Stucley, Walrond, etc.

The antiquary Sir William Pole (died 1635) compiled a list of blazons of Devon families. It was published with much other material in 1791 as Collections Towards a Description of the County of Devon.

== List of Devon arms ==
The following armorials are listed in the Heraldic Visitations of Devon, 1531, 1564 & 1620:

=== A ===
Name	Escutcheon	Blazon	Seat, parish
Abbott		Sable, a cross voided between four eagles displayed or	Hartland Abbey; Luffincott
Acland		Chequy argent and sable, a fesse gules	Acland Barton, Landkey; Holnicote, Somerset; Killerton, Devon; Fremington House, Fremington; Hawkridge, Chittlehampton; Combe, Goodleigh; Sprydon, Broadclyst
Adams		Or, a lion rampant between six crosses crosslet within a bordure engrailed sable	Townstal, Dartmouth; Bowden, Ashprington(?); (Charlton Adam, Ilchester, Somerset)
Addington		Per pale ermine and ermines, on a chevron between three fleurs-de-lys four lozenges all counterchanged	Leigh
Aleyn		Per bend rompu argent and sable, six martlets counterchanged	Bampton
Amadas		Azure, a chevron ermine between three oaken slips acorned proper	Plymouth
Amerideth		Gules, a lion rampant regardant or	Pole, Slapton
Amory		Barry nebulé of six argent and gules, over all a bend azure	Whitechapel, Bishops Nympton
Arscott		Per chevron azure and ermine in chief two buck's heads cabossed or	Arscott, Holsworthy; Dunsland, Bradford; Tetcott; Annery, Monkleigh
Ashe/Aysshe/Esse		Argent, two chevrons sable	Sowton, alias Clist Fomeson/Somson
Atwill		Argent, a chevron sable over all a pile counterchanged	Mamhead; Walkhampton
Ayre		Gules, on a bend between six crosses formée fitchée argent three mullets sable	Wotton, Atherington
Ayshford		Argent, between two chevrons sable three ashen keys vert	Ayshford, Burlescombe

=== B ===
Name	Escutcheon	Blazon	Seat, parish
Babington		Argent, ten torteaux in chief a label of three points azure	Ottery St Mary
Badcocke		Sable, on a pale argent three cocks gules	Shebbear
Bagg		Lozengy argent and gules, on a chief or three cinquefoils azure	Plymouth; Saltram, Plympton St Mary
Ball		Argent, a chevron gules between three fire balls proper (Note: As seen in 19th c. stained glass window in Mamhead Church. Blazoned with chevron sable and with difference of a martlet, per Vivian, p. 35)	Mamhead
Bampfylde/Bampfield		Or, on a bend gules three mullets argent	Poltimore; North Molton; Warleigh, Tamerton Foliot; Bampfield House, Exeter
Barby		Argent, a chevron between three garbs or	Washfield
Barkley		Sable, a fess ermine between three cinquefoils argent (Note: Barkley arms identical to Potter arms, see Vivian pp. 43, 612. Escallops in place of cinqufoils per Pole, p. 469)	Okenbury, Ringmore
Barry		Barry of six argent and gules	Winscott, St Giles in the Wood
Bartlett		Ermine, on a pale nebulée azure three sinister gloves pendent tasselated argent the whole between two flaunches of the second each charged with two crescents palewise of the third	Ludbrooke, Ermington
Basset		Barry wavy of six or and gules	Whitechapel, Bishops Nympton; Umberleigh; Heanton Punchardon; Watermouth Castle
Bastard		Or, a chevron azure	Efford, Egg Buckland; Garston, West Alvington; Kitley, Yealmpton; Sharpham, Ashprington; Lyneham, Yealmpton; Buckland Court, Buckland-in-the-Moor
Battishill		Azure, a cross-crosslet in saltire between four owls argent legged and beaked or	South Tawton; Drewsteignton; Spreyton
Beaple		Gules, a bend vairy between six escallops argent	Barnstaple; Knowstone;
Beaumont		Barry vair and gules	Youlston, Shirwell; Gittisham
Bellew		Sable fretty or	Stockleigh English; Ash, Braunton
Bellot		Argent, on a chief sable three cinquefoils of the field	Downton (Note: Location of this estate unknown)
Bennett		Sable, a chevron engrailed erminois between three ears of wheat or	Whiteway, Chudleigh
Bere (alias Beare)		Argent, three bear's heads erased sable muzzled or	Huntsham; Morebath
Berry		Or, three bars gules	Berrynarbor
Beryman		Argent, a chevron between three horses trippant sable	Berrie, (Dunsford?)
Bickford		Argent, a chevron engrailed between three martlets sable	Bickington, Dunsland
Bidlake		Gules, a fess between three pigeons argent	Great Bidlake, Bridestowe
Bishop		Gules, three lozenges argent each charged with an eagle displayed of the field	"Coldash/Choldashe"
Blackall (Note: The mural monument survives in St Mary's Church, Totnes, Devon, to Christopher Blackall (1581-1633) of Hampsted in the parish of Totnes, and his four wives, see File:ChristopherBlackall Died1633 TotnesChurch Devon.jpg. Christopher Blackall (1581–1633) donated 50 books to Totnes Church, many of which were used by John Prince (1643–1723) in writing his Worthies of Devon)		Paly of six or and sable on a chief gules three bezants	Cowick; Hampsted, Totnes
Blackmore		Or, on a fess sable between three Moor's heads in profile couped of the last as many crescents argent	Bishop's Nympton
Blagdon / Blackdon		Azure, three trefoils slipped argent on a chief indented gules two annulets or	Blackdon, Ashwater (?)
Blewett		Or, a chevron between three eagles displayed vert	Holcombe Rogus; (And in Somerset: Greenham Barton; Cothay Manor; Kittisford)
Bodley		Argent, five martlets saltirewise sable on a chief azure three ducal crowns or	Dunscombe, Crediton; Exeter
Bogan		Sable, a cockatrice (displayed) argent crested membered and jelloped gules	Totnes
Bolitho		Ermine, on a plain chevron between two chevronels engrailed and three fleurs-de-lys sable five bezants	Exeter; Holcombe Burnell
Bonville		Sable, six mullets argent pierced gules	Shute
Bourchier		Argent, a cross engrailed gules between four water bougets sable	Tawstock; Bampton
Bowerman		Ermine, on a bend cotised sable three boar's heads couped or	Culm Davy, Hemyock; Whitehall, Hemyock
Broughton		Argent, on a chevron between three crosses pommée sable as many buck's heads cabossed or on a chief of the second a goat passant of the first	Warbrightley (modern: Waspley), Stoodleigh
Browne		Gules, a chevron ermine between two chevronells and three escallops or	Brown's Ilash, Langtree
Bruton		Per pale gules and azure, a fess between two chevrons argent	Heavitree
Budockshed		Sable, three fusils in fess between three buck's faces argent	Budockshed, St Budeaux
Burgoyne		Azure, a hound passant argent	South Tawton
Burnard (Note: Charles Frederick Burnard (1816-post 1894) of Chatsworth Lodge in the parish of Compton Gifford, near Plymouth, Devon, was Mayor of Plymouth in 1882 (Vivian, p. 849))		Argent, three escallops in bend between two bendlets azure in chief and in base a leopard's face jessant-de-lys of the last	Chatsworth Lodge, Compton Gifford
Burnby		Argent, two bars counter-embattled ermines	Burnby, Bratton Clovelly
Burrington		Argent, a lion rampant sable flory or	Idford, Chudleigh; Sandford
Bury		Ermine, on a bend engrailed azure three fleurs-de-lys or	Colleton, Chulmleigh
Butler (Note: Although Thomas Butler, 7th Earl of Ormonde (d.1515) (whose wife was Anne Hankford the heiress of Annery, Monkleigh, Devon, and whose heraldry survives on a bench-end in Monkleigh Church) is known to have died without male progeny (the earldom descended to his distant male cousin), the family of Butler of Parkham submitted a pedigree to the heralds at the Heraldic Visitation of Devon of 1620 which claimed descent from a certain Humfridus Boteler de Annery (Vivian, p. 104), whose identity is therefore uncertain. The arms however of Butler of Parkham are the arms of Butler, Earl of Ormond (Gules, three covered cups or) differenced with a field azure.)		Azure, three covered cups or	Parkham; Littleham

=== C ===
Name	Escutcheon	Blazon	Seat, parish
Cabell		Vert fretty argent, over all a fess gules	Brook, Buckfastleigh
Cade		Argent, three piles in point wavy sable	Fremington; Barnstaple
Callard		Gyronny of six or and sable, three Moor's heads sidefaced couped proper wreathed round the temples (argent)	Callard, Burrington (?); (Note: Location of Callard uncertain, however an ancient farmhouse of than name survives in the parish of Burrington (see listed building text )) Southcott House, Winkleigh
Calmady		Azure, a chevron between three pears or	Calmady, Penfound, Poundstock, Cornwall;Langdon, Wembury; Stoke Climsland, Cornwall; Leawood, Bridestowe;
Calwoodleigh		Azure, two wings conjoined argent over all on a fess gules three bezants	Calwoodleigh (mod:Calverleigh); Cove, Stoodleigh; Uplowman
Carew		Or, three lions passant sable	Crowcombe; Antony, Cornwall; Tiverton Castle; Haccombe; Bickleigh Castle; Mohuns Ottery
Carswell		Sable, a bend or	Carswell, Holbeton
Carwythan		Argent, a fleur-de-lys gules a bordure engrailed of the second	Panston, Sydenham Damerel; St Petrock, Exeter; Manaton; (Carwythan, Cornwall)
Cary		Argent, on a bend sable three roses of the field	Cary, St Giles on the Heath; Clovelly; Cockington; Torr Abbey
Champernowne		Gules, a saltire vair between twelve billets or	Modbury; Bere Ferrers; Dartington; Ilfracombe
Champneys		Argent, a lion rampant gules a bordure engrailed sable	Cockworthy, (Note: Former seat of the Cockworthy family, today "Cogworthy" Farm Yarnscombe)
Chanon		Argent, on a chevron gules two couple closes or	Escot, Talaton
Chappell		Or, an anchor in pale sable	Barnstaple; Whitston
Charles		Ermine, on a chief wavy gules an eagle displayed or	Tavistock
Cheney		Gules, four fusils in fess argent on each an escallop sable	Pinhoe
Chichester		Chequy or and gules, a chief vair	Raleigh, Pilton; Eggesford; Hall, Bishop's Tawton; Pill, Bishop's Tawton; Arlington; Youlston, Shirwell; Widworthy; Ruxford, Sandford; Westcott, Marwood Hearsdon, Swimbridge; Stowford, Swimbridge
Cholmeley		Gules, in chief two close helmets argent in base a garb or	Tiverton
Cholwill		Argent, on a bend sable three arrow shafts of the field heads and feathers or	Lutsford, Hartland
Chudleigh		Ermine, three lions rampant gules	Ashton; Haldon
Clapham		Argent, on a bend azure six fleurs-de-lys or, two, two and two	Barnstaple; (Beamsley Hall, (Note: The home from 1980-2005 of the son and heir of the 11th Duke of Devonshire, and today part of the Bolton Hall estate of the Duke of Devonshire) Yorkshire)
Clement (Note: John Clement was a member of the Corporation of Plymouth in 1620 and married Judith Sparke, a sister of John Sparke (c. 1574–1640), MP, of The Friary, in the parish of St Jude, Plymouth, Devon (Vivian, pp. 193, 856))		Argent, two bends wavy gules on a chief of the last three estoiles or	Plymouth
Clifford		Chequy or and azure a fess gules	Chudleigh; Kingsteignton.
Clobbery		Argent, a chevron between three bats displayed sable	Bradstone
Clotworthy		Azure, a chevron ermine between three chaplets or	Clotworthy, Wembworthy; Rashleigh, Wembworthy
Cockeram		Argent, on a bend sable three leopard's faces of the field	Hillersdon, Cullompton; Growen, Cullompton
Cockshead		Azure, a cinquefoil argent a chief lozengy of the second and gules	Chulmleigh
Coffin		Azure, three bezants between eight crosses crosslet or	Portledge, Alwington; Monkleigh; Inwardleigh
Cogan		Gules, three (mulbery) leaves argent (Note: As blazoned by Sir William Pole (d.1635), Collections Towards a Description of the County of Devon, Sir John-William de la Pole (ed.), London, 1791, p. 447 and as depicted quartered on monument of Lady Frances Bourchier (1587-1612), daughter of William Bourchier, 3rd Earl of Bath (d.1623), in the Bedford Chapel at Chenies, Buckinghamshire. The arms of Cogan (a branch of which later became known as Goggin) are variously blazoned elsewhere as oak leaves, aspen leaves, etc.)	Bampton
Cole		Argent, a bull passant sable armed or a bordure of the second bezantée	Nethway, Brixham; Slade, Cornwood; Bucks, Woolfardisworthy
Collamore		Gules billetée or, three crescents of the second	Saunton, Braunton
Colleton		Or, three stag's heads couped proper	Exeter
Collins		Azure, three torches or enflamed proper	Ottery St Mary; Offwell
Colman		Per fess argent and sable, a cross flory between four mullets all counterchanged	Gornhay, Tiverton
Cooke		Ermine, on a bend cotised gules three cats-a-mountain passant guardant or	Thorne, Ottery St Mary
Coplestone		Argent, a chevron engrailed gules between three leopard's faces azure	Copplestone, Colebrooke; Warleigh, Tamerton Foliot; Eggesford
Coram		Argent, a cross sable between four eagles displayed gules	Ottery St Mary
Cory		Argent, a saltire sable on a chief azure three cinquefoils or	Cory, West Putford
Cottell		Or, a bend gules	Yealmbridge, Yealmpton; Sampford Peverell; Cottles Barton, North Tawton
Cotton		Argent, a bend sable between three pellets	Bishop's Palace, Exeter; Shobrooke; Silverton
Courtenay		Or, three torteaux	Okehampton Castle; Tiverton Castle; Powderham; Molland; Colcombe, Colyton; Upcott, Cheriton Fitzpaine; Moreton Hampstead
Croker		Argent, a chevron engrailed gules between three crows proper	Croker's Hele, Meeth; Lyneham, Yealmpton
Crossing		Or, on a chevron azure between three crosses crosslet fitchée gules as many bezants	Exeter
Cruwys		Azure, a bend per bend indented argent and gules between six escallops or	Cruwys Morchard
Crymes / Grymes		Or, three bars gules each charged with as many martlets of the field on a chief azure two bars nebulée argent	Crapstone, Buckland Monachorum; Meavy
Cudmore		Argent, a fess nebulee gules between three eagles displayed sable armed of the second	Templeton
Culme		Azure, a chevron ermine between 3 pelicans vulning their breasts or	Molland Champson; Canonsleigh Abbey
Cutcliffe		Gules, three pruning hooks argent	Damage, Mortehoe; Weach, Westleigh; Webbery, Alverdiscott; Coombe, Witheridge

=== D ===
Name	Escutcheon	Blazon	Seat, parish
Davie (Bardolph arms)		Azure, three cinquefoils or on a chief of the last a lion passant gules	Creedy, Sandford; Canonteign, Christow; Ruxford, Sandford;
Davie (de Way arms) (see also Davy of Ebberly below)		Argent, a chevron sable between three mullets pierced gules	Way, St Giles in the Wood; Creedy, Sandford; Canonteign, Christow; Ruxford, Sandford;
Daviles		Argent, a chevron embattled erminois between three fleurs-de-lys azure	Marland, Petrockstowe (Note: Location of Marland in parish of Petrockstowe per Vivian, p. 497)
Davy alias Dewy (de Way arms) (see also Davie of Creedy above)		Argent, two chevronells sable between three mullets gules	Way, St Giles in the Wood; Ebberly, Roborough; "Beauford" (Beaford); Owlacombe, Roborough;
Delves		Argent, a chevron gules fretty or between three delves sable (a "delve" being a "sod of turf")	Crediton
Dene		Argent, a lion rampant purpure	Newton St Petrock
Denys/Dennis		Ermine, three battle-axes gules	Holcombe Burnell; Bicton
Denys/Dennis		Azure, three Danish battle axes erect or	Orleigh
Diamond		Gules, three fusils conjoined in fess argent over all a fess gules (sic)	Tiverton
Dillon		Argent, a lion rampant between three crescents an estoile issuant from each gules over all a fess azure (Note: As stated in Vivian, p. 284, with obvious printer's error ("Az" in place of "Ar") in that the field is given erroneously as azure, with a fess also azure, in contravention of the "Rule of Tinctures", and would not show fully against the same background. Pole (p. 480) gives the field as argent, but gives the location of the crescents incorrectly as on the fess. A relief-sculpted image of these arms survives on the large monument of John Chichester (died 1569) of Raleigh, Pilton, Devon, see image:File:HeraldicPanelChichesterMonumentPiltonDevon1569.JPG, which shows the correct arrangement of the crescents and estoiles, although the tincture of the field has been wrongly re-painted as or)	Chymwell, Bratton Fleming; Hart, Heanton Punchardon
Docton		Per fess gules and argent, two crescents in chief or another in base sable	Docton, Hartland
Downe		Gules, a buck's head cabossed ermine attired or	Tushill, Pilton
Dowrish		Argent, a bend cotised sable a bordure engrailed of the last	Dowrish, Sandford
Drake		Argent, a wyvern wings displayed and tail nowed gules	Ash, Musbury; Mount Drake, Musbury
Drake		Sable, a fess wavy between two estoiles argent	Buckland Abbey, Buckland Monachorum; Nutwell, Woodbury
Drewe		Ermine, a lion passant gules	Sharpham, Ashprington; Killerton, Broadclyst; The Grange, Broadhembury
Duck		Or, on a fess wavy sable three lozenges of the field	Heavitree, Exeter; Mount Radford, Exeter
Duke		Per fesse argent and azure, three chaplets counterchanged	Otterton
Dyer (Note: Richard Dyer c.1545/54 purchased Yarde from the Yarde family, whose longtime seat it had been, following their removal to Bradley (Risdon, p. 176; Allan et al., p. 244). His great-great-great-grandson was the botanist Richard Dyer (born 1651), a Fellow of Oriel College, Oxford, who inherited Yarde from his elder brother William Dyer (d.1714) and rebuilt it in 1718 (John Allan, Nat Alcock, David Dawson, West Country Households, 1500-1700, p. 244 The Stained Hangings at Yarde Farm))		Or, a chief indented gules a mullet for difference	Yarde, Malborough
Dynham		Gules, four fusils in fess a bordure ermine	Wortham, Lifton

=== E ===
Name	Escutcheon	Blazon	Seat, parish
Edgcumbe		Gules, on a bend ermines cotised or three boar's heads couped argent	Edgcumbe, Milton Abbot; Tavistock; Ottery, Lamerton (Mount Edgcumbe, Cornwall; Cotehele, Cornwall)
Edmonds		Or, a chevron azure on a canton of the second a boar's head couped between three fleurs-de-lys of the first	Plymouth
Edwards		Per bend sinister ermine and ermines, a lion rampant or	St Mary Major, Exeter
Elford		Per pale argent and azure, a lion rampant gules	Sheepstor, Yelverton
Eliot		Azure, a fess or	Tavistock
Ellacott		Lozengy or and azure, a bordure gules	Milbury; (Note: Location of Milbury unknown. Several streets in Exminster are named "Milbury") Exeter, St Petrock's
Ellyot		Argent, a fess gules between two bars gemelles wavy azure	Farringdon
English		Sable, three lioncels rampant argent	Stockleigh English
Eveleigh		Per pale or and sable, two chevronels between three griffins passant counterchanged	Holcombe, Ottery St Mary

=== F ===
Name	Escutcheon	Blazon	Seat, parish
Farringdon		Sable, three unicorns courant in pale argent armed and crined or (Note: Courant, per Pole, p. 482)	Little Farringdon, Farringdon
Fenner / Venner		Azure, on a cross argent between four eagles displayed or a cross formée sable	Rose Ash
Fitz		Argent guttée de sang, a cross engrailed gules	Fitz-Ford, Tavistock
Flay (Note: Thomas Flay (d.1634) of Exeter, 2nd son of John Flay of Charlton, was Mayor of Exeter. A portrait of his wife Elizabeth Spicer was hanging in the Guildhall, Exeter, in 1895 (Vivian, p. 343, note 3))		Ermine, on a pale azure three birds argent	Charlton, Payhembury
Floyer		Sable, a chevron between three arrows points downward argent	Floyer Hayes
Ford		Party per fesse or and sable, in chief a greyhound courant in base an owl within a bordure engrailed all counter-changed	Nutwell; Chagford; Ashburton; Bagtor, Ilsington
Ford		Gules, a castle argent crowned or on the port a cross formée of the third	Ford's Moore (modern: "Fordmore"), Plymtree
Fortescue		Azure, a bend engrailed argent cotised or	Whympston, Modbury; Castle Hill, Filleigh; Weare Giffard; Fallapit, East Allington; Buckland Filleigh; Preston, Devon; Wood, Woodleigh; Spridleston, Brixton;
Fountayne		Argent, three bars gemelles gules on a canton azure a lion passant guardant or	Bawcombe
Fowell		Argent, a chevron sable on a chief gules three mullets pierced of the first	Fowelscombe, Ugborough; Black Hall, North Huish
Fownes		Azure, two eagles displayed in chief and a mullet in base argent	Plymouth; Whitleigh, St Budeaux; Kittery Court, Kingswear; Nethway, Brixham; (Dunster Castle, Somerset)
Fry		Gules, three horses courant in pale argent	Yarty, Membury; Fry's Hele, (Note: Today "Friars Hele Farm"; the arms of Fry of Fry's Hele are differenced by a field vert (Pole, p. 484) see image File:Fry (of Fry's Hele) arms.svg) Meeth; Buckerell
Fulford		Gules, a chevron argent	Great Fulford, Dunsford
Furlong		Argent, two bars between eight martlets sable	Tamerton Foliot; Bawcombe, Ugborough
Fursdon		Argent, a chevron azure between three fireballs sable fired proper	Fursdon, Cadbury;
Furse		Gules, a chevron embattled counter-embattled between six halberds in pairs saltire-wise or	Morshead, (Dean Prior (?) (Note: Vivian's pedigree, p. 385, shows a long history of baptisms, marriages and burials at Dean Prior of members of this family))
Fursland		Or, a lion rampant sable between three crosses pattée gules	Bickington

=== G ===
Name	Escutcheon	Blazon	Seat, parish
Gale		Azure, a fesse argent fretty of the field	Crediton
Garland		Or, three pales gules on a chief per pale gules and sable a chaplet and a demi-lion issuant argent	Whitfield, Marwood
Gay		Or, a chevron between three escallops azure	Goldworthy, Parkham; Frithelstock
Geere		Gules, two bars or each charged with three mascles azure on a canton of the second a leopard's face of the third	Heavitree; Holloway, Kenn
Giffard		Sable, three fusils conjoined in fesse ermine	Brightley, Chittlehampton; Tiverton Castle; Halsbury, Parkham
Gilbert		Argent, on a chevron gules three roses of the field (Note: Gilbert: Argent, on a chevron gules three roses of the field. These are the ancient arms of the family, as evidenced on monuments in Marldon Church 1496 and 1530 and in Churston Ferrers Church c.1575 (Source: Burke's Landed Gentry, 1937, p. 886). In the 1620 Heraldic Visitation of Devon by William Camden, Clarenceux King of Arms, the following arms were allowed to Raleigh Gilbert (1584–1634) of Compton: Ermine, on a chevron sable three roses argent. (Source: Burke's Landed Gentry, 1937, p. 886). The family's arms are very confused, for example as given in Vivian, p.405: Or, on a chevron sable three roses of the field leaved proper a bordure gules. Pole, p. 484, gives: Argent, on a chevron sable three roses of the field)	Compton, Marldon; Sandridge, Stoke Gabriel; Greenway, Churston Ferrers; Bovey Tracey; (Bodmin Priory, Cornwall)
Giles		Per chevron argent and azure, a lion rampant counterchanged collared or	Bowden, Ashprington; Sharpham, Ashprington; Dean Court, Dean Prior
Glanville		Azure, three saltires or	Holwell; Kilworthy, Tavistock
Godwyn/Goodwyn		Or, on a fess between six lion's heads erased gules an annulet of the field	Clistwill, Plymtree; Torrington
Goodridge		Argent, a fess sable in chief three cross crosslets fitchée of the last	Totnes
Gould		Per saltire azure and or a lion rampant counterchanged	Downes, Crediton; Floyer Hayes; Lew Trenchard
Gourney		Argent, a cross engrailed gules in the first quarter a cinquefoil vert	Townstal; Dartmouth
Gove		Azure, a cross lozengy (argent and sable?) between four eagles displayed sable	Woodbury
Greenwood		Paly of six argent and sable, on a bend gules three escallops or	Torrington
Grylls		Or, three bendlets enhanced gules	Tavistock

=== H ===
Name	Escutcheon	Blazon	Seat, parish
Hakewill		Or, a bend between six trefoils slipped purpure	Exeter
Hals		Argent, a fess between three griffin's heads erased sable	Kenedon, Sherford; Efford, Egg Buckland
Hamlyn		Gules, a lion rampant ermine crowned or	Widecombe; Buckfastleigh; Woolfardisworthy; Clovelly
Hancock		Gules, on a chief argent three cocks of the field	Combe Martin; Mount Radford, Exeter
Harewood (Note: Henry Harewood (d.1631) by his will donated £100 as the "Harewood Gift", a charity for the poor of South Molton (Report of the Commissioners Appointed ...: To Inquire Concerning Charities ..., 1825, pp. 125-6 ))		Sable, on a chief argent three hart's heads erased of the field	South Molton
Harlewyn		Azure, a fess argent in base three apples of the last	Sidmouth
Harper		Argent, a lion rampant a bordure engrailed sable a crescent for difference	Berry Narbor; (Swarkestone Hall, Derbyshire)
Harris (of Radford)		Sable, three crescents argent	Radford, Plymstock
Harris (of Hayne)		Sable, three crescents argent a bordure of the last	Hayne, Stowford
Harris (of Cornworthy)		Sable, an antelope salient argent armed and crined or	Cornworthy Priory, Cornworthy
Harvey		Gules, on a bend argent three trefoils slipped vert	Aylesbeare
Hatch		Gules, two demi-lions passant guardant in pale or	Hatch/Hacche, South Molton; Aller, South Molton; Woolleigh, Beaford
Haydon		Argent, three bars gemels azure on a chief gules a fess dansettée or	Cadhay, Ottery St Mary; Ebford, Woodbury
Hele		Gules, five fusils in bend argent on each an ermine spot	Hele, Cornwood; Flete, Holbeton; Wembury
Helman		Vert, a chevron argent guttée de sang between three pheons or	Furland
Hext		Or, a tower triple-turreted between three battle axes sable	Kingston; Kingston, Staverton (?) (Note: The family of Hext resided at a place named "Kingston", which although Pole (d.1635) suggests (almost as a post scriptum) is Kingston in the parish of Staverton ("At Kingston their also dwelled Thomas Hext in King Edw 4 tyme" (Pole, Sir William (d.1635), Collections Towards a Description of the County of Devon, Sir John-William de la Pole (ed.), London, 1791, p. 277), cannot be reconciled with the well documented contemporaneous tenure of Kingston, Staverton, by the Barnhous family, whose heiress is known to have married John Rowe of Totnes. (During the reign of King Edward IV (1461–1483) "Kingston" was the seat of Thomas Hext, (Pole, Sir William (d.1635), Collections Towards a Description of the County of Devon, Sir John-William de la Pole (ed.), London, 1791, p. 277; Vivian, p. 484, pedigree of Hext of Kingston) one of whose daughters, Agnes Hext, married Sir Lewis Pollard (Vivian, p. 598, pedigree of Pollard) (c.1465-1526) of Grilstone in the parish of Bishop's Nympton, Devon, Justice of the Common Pleas from 1514 to 1526 (Hoskins, W.G., A New Survey of England: Devon, London, 1959 (first published 1954), p. 338) and an MP for Totnes in 1491) There is however a parish and village named Kingston in South Devon, about 14 miles south-west of Kingston, Staverton, and Thomas Hext "of Kingston", the first member of the family recorded in the Heraldic Visitations of Devon, married a member of the Fortescue family of Whympston, Modbury, about 2 1/2 miles north-west of the village of Kingston.)
Hill		Argent, a chevron between three water bougets sable	Shilston, Modbury (Note: Today, see Shilston Barton or Shilstone near Modbury. Sir Robert Hill jCP of Shilston and Houndstone, the father of Robert Hill Sheriff of Devon was kinsman to Sir John Hill jKB of Hill's Court, Exeter and Houndstone, the father of Robert Hill of Spaxton MP)
Hill		Gules, a chevron ermine between three garbs or	Plymouth; Cotleigh
Hillersdon		Argent, on a chevron sable three bull's heads cabossed of the field	Hillersdon, Cullompton; Membland, Holbeton
Hockmore		Per chevron sable and or, in chief two pairs of reaping hooks endorsed and entwined blades azure handles of the second in base a moorcock of the first combed and wattled gules	Buckland Baron, Combe-in-Teignhead (Note: In the parish of Combe-in-Teignhead per Lysons, Magna Britannia, Vol.6, p. 135)
Hody		Argent, a fess per fess indented vert and sable between two cotises counterchanged of the fess	Nethway, Brixham; (Pilsdon, Dorset) (Note: Sir John Hody (d.1441) of Pilsdon in Dorset and Stowell, Wiveliscombe, Somerset, Chief Justice of the King's Bench, married Margaret Cole, heiress of Nethway (Pole, pp. 282-3))
Holbeame		Argent, a chevron enarched sable	Holbeame, West Ogwell; Bawcombe, Ugborough(?)
Holland (Note: This family was descended from Robert de Holland, 1st Baron Holand (c. 1283 – 1328), son of Sir Robert de Holland of Upholland, Lancashire (See Vivian, p. 475))		Azure semée-de-lys argent, a lion rampant of the second	Countess Wear; Upcott, Sheepwash
Holway of Waton (Note: Not to be confused with arms of Holway of Holway, Tor Bryan, Devon (see Pole, p. 488))		Sable, two swords in saltire hilts and pommels in chief the dexter surmounted by the sinister	Waton (alias Wadeton, Wayton, etc.), Stoke Gabriel
Hooker alias Vowell		Or, a fess vair between two lions passant guardant sable	St Mary Major, Exeter
Hore		Sable, an eagle double-headed displayed argent a bordure engrailed of the last	Chagford
Howper/Hooper		Gyronny of eight or and ermine, over all a castle triple-towered sable	Musbury; Fullabrook, Braunton; Raleigh, Pilton
Howpill		Argent, on a pale gules three lion's faces or	Exeter, St Mary Arches (?)
Hunkin		Argent, a mascle sable over all a fess of the last	Gatherleigh, Lifton
Hunt (Note: Thomas Hunt (d.1548) was thrice Mayor of Exeter (Vivian, p. 494))		Azure, on a bend between two water bougets or three leopard's faces gules	Hams, Chudleigh (Note: For Hams as the seat of Hunt see: Jones, Mary, History of Chudleigh, 1852)

=== I ===
Name	Escutcheon	Blazon	Seat, parish
Incledon		Argent, a chevron engrailed between three tuns sable fire issuing from the bung hole proper	Incledon, Braunton; Buckland, Braunton; Colleton, Chulmleigh; Pilton House, Pilton; Yeotown, Goodleigh
Inglett		Sable, a bend argent between three escallops or	Alwington; Lamerton
Isack		Per pale azure and purpure, a cross flory or between four lambs argent	Boreat, Atherington

=== J ===
Name	Escutcheon	Blazon	Seat, parish
Jarvys		Argent, six ostrich feathers sable, three, two and one	Stralling (Note: "Stralling" (Vivian, p. 504), location unknown; ? Stalling Thorne in the parish of Huntsham ?)
Jewell		Or, on a chevron azure between three gillyflowers gules stalked and leaved vert a maiden's head of the first ducally crowned of the third on a chief sable a hawk's lure double stringed between two falcons argent beaked and legged of the first	Bowden, Berry Narbor

=== K ===
Name	Escutcheon	Blazon	Seat, parish
Kellond		Sable, a fess argent in chief three fleurs-de-lys of the last	Painsford, Ashprington
Kelloway		Argent, two grozing irons in saltire sable between four Kelway pears proper (Note: Vivian, p. 510 adds a bordure engrailed of the second. No such border is visible in any of the many depictions of the Kelloway arms surviving in the churches of Dolton, Iddisleigh, and Dowland; However, the bordure does appear in the Kelloway arms shown in Branscombe Church, Devon, on the Mural monument to Joan Tregarthin (d.1583) widow successively of John Kelloway of Cornwall and John Wadham (d.1578) of Merifield, Ilton, Somerset and Edge, Branscombe. See File:JoanTregarthinMonument BranscombeChurch Devon.PNG)	Stowford/Stafford, Dolton
Kelly		Argent, a chevron between three billets gules	Kelly
Kendall		Argent, a chevron between three dolphins naiant embowed sable	Kingsbridge; Cofton, nr. Dawlish
Kirkham		Argent, three lions rampant gules a bordure engrailed sable	Blagdon, Paignton; Bidwell, Newton St Cyres
Knapman		Or, on a cross gules between four Cornish choughs proper five blocks of tin marked with the letter W	Wonson, (Note: Residence at Wonson per Baring-Gould, Sabine, An English Home, p. 277, Scapegraces) Throwleigh

=== L ===
Name	Escutcheon	Blazon	Seat, parish
Land		Gyronny of eight or and sable a bend gules	Silverton
Langford		Paly of six argent and gules, on a chief of the first a lion passant sable	Bratton Clovelly
Lante (Note: John Lante (d.1614) was Mayor of Exeter and has a monument in Exeter Cathedral (Vivian, p. 523))		Per pale argent and gules, a cross engrailed counterchanged	Exeter
Larder		Argent, three piles sable each charged with as many bezants	Upton Pyne
Leach		Ermine, on a chief engrailed gules three ducal coronets or	Cadeleigh; All Hallows, Goldsmith Street, Exeter
Lee (Note: Richard Lee (d.1620) of Totnes was Mayor of Totnes in 1620 (Vivian, p. 527))		Azure, on a fess cotised or three leopard's faces of the field	Pinhoe; Totnes
Leigh		Argent, a lion rampant gules on a sinister canton azure an escallop or	Borough, Northam
Leigh		Argent, two bars azure over all a bend compony or and gules	Rudge, Morchard Bishop
Lippingcott		Per fess embattled gules and sable, three leopards passant argent	Luffincott/Lippingcott; Wibbery, Alverdiscott
Longe (Note: In 1620 Anthonie Longe (born 1597) was a servant of the Earl of Bath (Vivian, p. 532) at Tawstock in North Devon. A junior branch of the prominent Long family (Vivian, p. 532) of South Wraxall and Draycot Cerne in Wiltshire, descended from Robert Long (died 1447))		Sable semée of crosses pattée, a lion rampant argent	North Molton
Lowman		Argent, three escutcheons sable each charged with a dexter gauntlet back affrontée or	Whitestone; Netherton, Farway
Luscombe		Argent, on a pile azure a lion rampant guardant crowned or	Luscombe, Rattery
Lutton		Vert, an eagle displayed with two heads within an orle of trefoils or	Cofford, Kenton
Luttrell		Or, a bend between six martlets sable	Hartland Abbey; Saunton; (Dunster Castle, Somerset)
Lynn		Gules, a demi-lion rampant argent a bordure sable bezantée	Exeter

=== M ===
Name	Escutcheon	Blazon	Seat, parish
Mainwaring		Argent, two bars gules within a bordure gobony or and sable	Exeter
Mallet		Azure, three escallops or	Ash, Iddesleigh; Curry Mallet; Woolleigh, Beaford; Deandon and St Audries; Widdecombe; Hatch, South Molton; West Quantoxhead;
Mallock		Per chevron engrailed or and sable, on three roundels three fleurs-de-lys all counterchanged	Cockington
Mapowder		Barry gules and argent, on the chief of the second a greyhound courant sable	Holsworthy
Martyn		Argent, two bars gules	Feudal barony of Barnstaple; Oxton, Kenton; Lindridge; (Athelhampton, Dorset).
Martyn (Note: The first member of this family (whose arms are a differenced version of FitzMartin, feudal barons of Barnstaple in Devon and Lords of Cemais in Wales) was Thomas Martin (d.1588) of Salisbury, Wiltshire, Mayor of Totnes, who married Christiana Savery of Totnes (Vivian, p. 558))		Argent, on two bars gules three crosses formée or	Broad Hempston
Marwood		Gules, a chevron between three goat's heads erased ermine attired or	Westcot, Marwood
Maynard		Argent, three sinister hands couped at the wrist gules	Sherford, Brixton
Menyfie		Vert, on a chevron between three martlets argent as many eagles displayed of the first	Collumpton; Harberton
Milford		Argent, three oak leaves in pale all proper	Wickington, South Tawton
Minshull		Azure, an estoile of six points issuing from a crescent argent	Exeter
Molford		Sable, a fess ermine between three swans argent	South Molton
Mohun		Or, a cross engrailed sable	Tavistock; Mohuns Ottery, Luppitt; Tor Mohun (Dunster Castle, Somerset; Hall, Lanteglos-by-Fowey, Cornwall; Boconnoc, Cornwall)
Monck		Gules, a chevron between three lion's heads erased argent	Potheridge, Merton
Moore		Argent, a chevron between three moorcocks sable crested gules	Moore, "near Tavistock"; Broadwoodwidger; Upcott, Cheriton Fitzpaine
Moore		Ermine, on a chevron azure three cinquefoils or	Moor Hayes, Cullompton
More		Sable, three garbs argent a bordure gobony or and gules	Broadclyst
Moulton		Per pale argent and ermine three bars gules	Cullompton

=== N ===
Name	Escutcheon	Blazon	Seat, parish
Newcombe		Argent, a fess embattled between two escallops in pale sable	Great Worthy, Drewsteignton; Easton, South Teign, Drewsteignton?; Exeter, St David's; Starcross, Kenton
Newcourt		Sable, a bend ermine between two eagles with two heads displayed or	Pickwell, Georgeham
Newton (Note: Col.John Newton (d.1655) of Crabaton (mod: Crabadon) was a Royalist in the Civil War (Burke's General Armory). Difference of arms of Newton baronets of Barrs Court, Gloucestershire (1660), of which family Sir Isaac Newton claimed to be a member)		Vert, two shinbones in saltire the sinister surmounted by the dexter argent	Crabadon, Diptford
Noble		Or, two lions passant guardant in pale azure between as many flaunches of the last on a fess gules three bezants	Bishop's Tawton
Northcote		Argent, three cross-crosslets in bend sable	Northcote, East Down; Newton St Cyres; Pynes, Upton Pyne
Northleigh		Argent, a chevron sable between three roses gules	Northleigh, Inwardleigh; Peamore, Exminster; Matford, Alphington
Northmore		Gules, a lion rampant or armed and langued azure crowned with an eastern crown argent	Cleve, St Thomas, Exeter; Well, South Tawton
Nutcombe		Or, a fess embattled between two escallops gules	Nutcombe, Clayhanger (Note: In Clayhanger parish (not Combe Martin), see: Extract of 1785 will of Buckland Nutcombe Bluett of Nutcombe, Clayhanger and Holcombe Court, Holcombe Rogus, archives of North Devon Record Office, Reference: 1777 B/FW8)

=== O ===
Name	Escutcheon	Blazon	Seat, parish
Osmond		Sable, a fess dancettée ermine in chief an eagle displayed or	Stagmill, Uplowman; Exeter

=== P ===
Name	Escutcheon	Blazon	Seat, parish
Parker		Sable, a stag's head cabossed between two flaunches argent	North Molton; Boringdon; Saltram; Whiteway, Chudleigh
Passmore		Or, a fess between three escutcheons gules on each a bend vair between two cinquefoils of the first all within a bordure azure bezantée (Note: Per Burke's Genealogical and Heraldic History of the Landed Gentry, 15th Edition, ed. Pirie-Gordon, H., London, 1937, p. 1761, pedigree of Passmore of Withyshaw, with drawing of arms confirming this blazon; The arms of Passmore are blazoned incorrectly in Vivian, Lt.Col. J.L., (Ed.) The Visitations of the County of Devon: Comprising the Heralds' Visitations of 1531, 1564 & 1620, Exeter, 1895, p. 589, pedigree of Passmore of Passmore Hayes as: Or, on a fess between three escutcheons gules each charged with a bend vair two cinquefoils of the first all within a bordure azure bezantée, which gives File:PassmoreArms.png)	Passmore Hayes, Tiverton; (Note: Passmore Hayes, now a small cottage 3.75 miles N-NE of Tiverton, at the end of the farm track to Longhayne Farm, approaching the Town Leat in an eastward direction. Passmore Hayes was in the parish of Tiverton, per: The topographer: containing a variety of original articles ..., Volume 1 edited by Sir Egerton Brydges, p. 142) Sutton, Halberton; Grilstone, Bishop's Nympton; (Withyshaw, Merstham, Surrey)
Pearse		Argent, two bars sable between six estoiles gules 3, 2 and 1	Blackmore, Plympton St Mary
Perry		Quarterly gules and or, on a bend argent three lions passant azure	Water (mod: Waterhouse), Membury
Petre		Gules, on a bend or between two escallops argent a Cornish chough proper between two cinquefoils azure	Bowhay, Dunchideock; Tor Newton, Tor Bryan, (and Ingatestone Hall, Essex).
Phillips		Or, on a chevron engrailed sable three eagle's heads erased argent	Alverdiscott
Pincombe		Per pale gules and azure, three close helmets argent garnished or	South Molton; North Molton; Filleigh; East Buckland
Plumleigh (Note: Several members of the Plumleigh family served as Mayor of Dartmouth)		(Argent?), a bend fusily gules	Dartmouth
Pointington		Argent, a bend gules between six fleurs-de-lys vert	Penicott, Shobrooke
Pole		Azure semée of fleurs de lis or, a lion rampant argent	Shute; Colcombe Castle
Pollard		Argent, a chevron sable between three escallops gules	Way, St Giles in the Wood; Grilstone, Bishop's Nympton; King's Nympton; Langley, Yarnscombe; Abbots Bickington; Horwood
Pollard (de Way arms) (Note: de Via arms, as also used by the Davie family of Creedy, Sandford, who claimed common origin with the Pollards from the de Way family, were quartered by Pollard with their escallop arms, (Prince, pp. 284 (footnote), 783) but were sometimes used alone, as evidenced most notably by all the surviving Pollard monuments and ledger stones in Horwood Church)		Argent, a chevron sable between three mullets pierced gules	Way, St Giles in the Wood; Grilstone, Bishop's Nympton; King's Nympton; Langley, Yarnscombe; Abbots Bickington; Horwood; Ford Abbey, Thorncombe; Knowstone
Pollexfen		Quarterly argent and azure, in the 1 and 4 quarter a lion rampant gules	Kitley, Yealmpton; Mothecombe, Holbeton; Caleston, Holbeton; Nutwell, Woodbury; Wembury
Pomeroy		Or, a lion rampant gardant gules armed and langued azure within a bordure engrailed sable	Berry Pomeroy Castle; Bowden, Ashprington; Sandridge, Stoke Gabriel; Beenleigh, (Note: "Bingley" or "Bindley" (Vivian, p. 609)) Harberton Ford, Harberton
Popham		Argent, on a chief gules two stag's heads cabosed or	Lynton; (Huntworth in Somerset; Popham in Hampshire; Littlecote in Wiltshire)
Pote		Azure, a chevron engrailed cotised argent between three doves of the second	Clawton
Potter (Note: Hugh Potter (1596-1661/2) (eldest son and heir of Tobias Potter of Iddesleigh) was a lawyer of Lincoln's Inn and a member of the household of the Earl of Northumberland (Vivian, p. 612))		Sable, a fess ermine between three cinquefoils argent (Note: Potter arms identical to Barkley arms, see Vivian pp. 43, 612)	Iddesleigh
Preston (Note: The Preston family of Devon was a junior branch of the de Preston family which during the reign of King Henry II (1154–1189) was seated at Preston Richard and Preston Patrick in Westmorland. On 1 April 1644, George Preston (of same ancient descent, same arms) was created a baronet "of Furness in the County of Lancaster". (Burke, Bernard, Genealogical and Heraldic History of the Extinct and Dormant Baronetcies ..., 2nd ed, 1844, pp. 424 et seq ))		Argent, two bars gules on a canton of the last a cinquefoil or	Upottery
Prestwood		Sable, a lion rampant between two flaunches or	Exeter
Prideaux		Argent, a chevron sable in chief a label of three points gules	Orcheton, Modbury; Adeston, Holbeton; Thuborough, Sutcombe; Soldon, Holsworthy; Netherton, Farway; Ashburton; Nutwell, Woodbury; Ford Abbey, Thorncombe; (also Prideaux Place, Padstow and Prideaux Castle, Luxulyan, Cornwall)
Prouse		Sable, three lions rampant argent	Gidleigh Castle; Chagford; Lustleigh; Barnstaple; Tiverton
Prouse (Note: Members of this family include Richard Prouse (d.1608), Mayor of Exeter, and his son John Prouse (d.1624/5), Mayor of Exeter in 1620, whose memorial exists in Exeter Cathedral (Vivian, p. 628, "MI"))		Ermine, three lions rampant argent	Exeter
Prust		Gules, on a chief argent two estoiles sable	Thorry, Hartland; Gorven, Hartland; Annery, Monkleigh
Prye		Ermine, a chevron sable a chief azure fretty or (Note: per Pole, Sir William (d.1635), Collections Towards a Description of the County of Devon, Sir John-William de la Pole (ed.), London, 1791, p. 498. Alternatively: Ermine, a chevron gules a chief azure fretty or (per Vivian, p. 631, pedigree of Prye of Horwell). These arms are visible on the monument to John Wrey (d.1597) in Tawstock Church, Devon. John Wrey's son Edmond Wrey married Katherine Prye, daughter of Roger Prye of Horwell (Vivian, p. 631))	Horwell, Colebrooke
Pyne (Note: This family was the heir of Coffin of Portledge, Alwington, Devon, and in 1796 assumed the additional surname and arms of Coffin, resulting in the name Pine-Coffin (Vivian, p. 211))		Gules, a chevron ermine between three pine apples or	East Down; Portledge, Alwington

=== Q ===
Name	Escutcheon	Blazon	Seat, parish
Quicke		Sable, a chevron vaire or and of the first between three griffin's heads erased of the second	Newton House, Newton St Cyres; Sherwood, (Note: Lauder, Rosemary, Devon Families, Tiverton, 2002, p. 129, sold by Savilles estate agent February 2017, £1.5M) Newton St Cyres

=== R ===
Name	Escutcheon	Blazon	Seat, parish
Radford		Sable, three lampagoes passant coward in pale argent	Upcott, Cheriton Fitzpaine; Okeford; Rockbeare
Raleigh		Gules crusilly or, a bend vair or Gules, a bend vair between six cross-crosslets or	Raleigh, Pilton
Raleigh		Gules, five fusils conjoined in bend argent (Note: Raleigh of Fardel arms per Pole, Sir William (d.1635), Collections Towards a Description of the County of Devon, Sir John-William de la Pole (ed.), London, 1791, p. 499; Pedigree given in Vivian (pp. 638-9) with same descent as Raleigh of Pilton, but with wrong arms)	Fardel, Cornwood; Colaton Raleigh; Smallridge, Axminster; (Nettlecombe Raleigh, Somerset)
Randall		Sable, three demi-lions rampant erased argent	Kentisbury
Rede		Gules, on a bend nebulée argent three shovelers sable	Wembury
Reynell		Argent, masonry sable a chief indented of the second	Forde, Wolborough; East Ogwell
Rider	Rider Arms	Azure, three crescents or	Bere Ferrers
Ridgeway		Sable, a pair of wings conjoined and elevated argent	Tor Mohun; Abbots Carswell
Risdon		Argent, three birdbolts sable	Winscott, St Giles in the Wood; Bableigh, Parkham
Roache		Azure, three roaches naiant in pale argent	Welcombe (Note: Welcombe is a parish near Hartland in North Devon, near the Cornish border. Other estates named "Welcombe" are listed in Pole, which may have been the residence of this family, with a very brief pedigree in Vivian, p. 651 with no mention of parish. However, mention is made of Week St Mary (in Cornwall), 13 miles south of Welcombe near Hartland, and the Roache family originated in "Lesawnte" (Lezant?, Cornwall. Lysons, Magna Britannia, Cornwall, Extinct Gentry, states: "Roche or De la Rupe of Roche — traced to the reign of Richard I. Hals says, that this family became extinct, in the male line, in 1357; that Sir William Blundell, husband of the heiress, took the name of Roche, which continued till the reign of Henry VIII., when the last of the family left four daughters, three of whom married Fortescue, Penkevil, and Boscawen. The Roches had married heiresses of Trevelyan and Page, and a coheiress of Durant. Arms of Roche: — Sab. three roaches, two, one, nayant, Argent." The Devon family used a crescent as the difference of a second son. The name was thus Latinized to de (la) Rupe (Lat: rupes-is, "rock") "from the rock", inspired by the French word la roche, le rocher, "rock", from degraded Latin rocca, recorded in use 980 AD (Larousse Lexis, Paris, 1979, p. 1654) from which the English word "rock" (Collins Dict))
Rolle		Or, on a fesse dancette between three billets azure each charged with a lion rampant of the first three bezants	Stevenstone, St Giles in the Wood; Bicton; Hudscott, Chittlehampton; Beam, Great Torrington; Heanton Satchville, Petrockstowe; Buckfast Place, Cathedral Close, St Martin's, Exeter (Note: townhouse of George Rolle (d.1552), where he died, comprising "messuage, garden and curtilage". It was held from the crown in burgage, worth 30 shillings. Details of Buckfast Place from his inquisition post mortem quoted in Byrne, Muriel St. Clare, (ed.) The Lisle Letters, 6 vols, University of Chicago Press, Chicago & London, 1981, vol.1, Appendix 25, p. 414. This house, later known as the "Abbot's Lodge", was destroyed in 1942 during World War II bombing. It had been the townhouse of the Abbot of Buckfast Abbey, which Abbey and much of its lands, apparently excluding the Abbot's Lodge, had been acquired following the Dissolution of the Monasteries by Sir Thomas Denys (c.1477-1561) of Holcombe Burnell, whose eventual heir (by coincidence) was the Rolle family. It was at the Abbot's Lodge that the Grand Duke of Tuscany was entertained by Sir John Rolle in 1669 and it remained in the Rolle family until 1737 when it was sold to the Rev. John Heskett.(Source:) A photograph of the arms of Sir Henry Rolle (1545–1625) in this building taken shortly before its destruction survives in: Devon Notes & Queries, Vol.9, 1916–17, pp. 97-9: "Armorial Bearings at the Abbot's Lodge", The Close, Exeter. Image see: File:SirHenryRolle (1545-1625) 1602Arms AbbotsLodge CathedralClose Exeter.jpg)
Roope		Argent, a lion rampant per fess gules and vert between seven pheons azure	Horswell, South Milton; East Allington; Bidwell, Newton St Cyres
Roope (Note: Monuments to the Roope family of Townstal exist in St Clement's Church, Dartmouth and in St Petrox's Church, Dartmouth (Pevsner, pp. 324, 322))		Argent, a lion rampant gules an orle of nine pheons azure	Townstal
Rowcliffe		Argent, on a chevron between three lion's heads erased gules a chess-rook or	Yarnscombe
Rowe		Gules, three paschal lambs or staff cross and banners argent	Lamerton
Rowe		Argent, on a chevron azure between three trefoils slipped per pale gules and vert three bezants	Kingston, Staverton; Bearton, Broad Hempston

=== S ===
Name	Escutcheon	Blazon	Seat, parish
Sainthill		Or, on a fess engrailed azure between three leopard's faces gules three bezants each charged with a fleur-de-lys of the second on a pile in chief of the second three demi-fleurs-de-lys attached to the top and sides of the first	Bradninch
Salisbury		Gules, a lion rampant crowned or between three crescents argent	Barnstaple
Sanford		Argent, a chevron between three martlets sable	Exeter
Savery		Gules, a fess vair between three unicorn's heads couped or	Shilston, Modbury; Willing, Rattery; Slade, Cornwood
Searle		Gules, on a chevron between three trefoils argent as many pellets	"Gotford in the parish of Holford in the hundred of Hemiock"; (Note: No such parish as "Holford" appears to exist. This seat (called Goddeford by Pole, p. 201 and Godeford by Risdon, p. 41) is possibly one of two places: Gosford (today Gosford Farm) near the hamlet of Taleford, about 2 miles SE of Awliscombe; Godford, about 1/4 mile NW of Awliscombe. Awliscombe was in the Hundred of Hemyock) Awliscombe
Seccombe alias Thorne (Note: These are the arms of Thorne of Thorne in the parish of Holsworthy, Devon, with difference of a bordure engrailed, with additional difference of a crescent for a second son. The family was descended from Degorie Thorne (second son of John Thorne of Thorne) who (circa 15th c.) married Margaret Seccombe, daughter and heiress of Thomas Seccombe of Seccombe, Devon)		Argent, a fess gules between three lions rampant sable a bordure engrailed of the last a crescent for difference	Weston, North Petherwin; Webworthy, North Petherwin
Segar		Azure, a cross moline argent	Highweek
Servington		Ermine, on a chief azure three buck's heads cabossed or	Tavistock; (Longford, Wiltshire)
Seward		Gules, on a fess or between two chevrons ermine three leopard's faces azure	Stoke-in-Teignhead
Seymour		Gules, two wings conjoined in lure or	Berry Pomeroy; Stover, Teigngrace;
Shapcott		Sable, (a chevron or (Note: As depicted in stained glass in east window of Shute Church, Devon, impaled by arms of Pole of Shute, representing the marriage of Sir Courtenay Pole, 2nd Baronet (1619–1695) and Urith Shapcott, daughter of Thomas Shapcott of Shapcott in the parish of Knowstone, Devon. Elsewhere the arms are shown with a chevron or (Barnstaple Church on Tucker monument), or without chevron (in Knowstone Church and in Molland Church). (Pole (Vivian 1895, p. 603), Shapcott (Vivian 1895, p. 677), blazoned with chevron or)) between) three dovecotes argent	Shapcott, Knowstone
Shapleigh (Note: John Shapleigh (d.1628) of Totnes was Mayor of Dartmouth and twice Mayor of Totnes. His monument is in St Saviour's Church, Dartmouth (Vivian, p. 678, "MI"). No connection is known to John Shapleigh (died 1414) of Exeter, MP, father of John Shapleigh (fl. 1414–1427), of Exeter, MP)		Vert, a chevron argent betyeen three escallops or	Totnes; Dartmouth
Sharpe (Note: William Sharpe (fl.1620) of Tiverton (3rd son of Robert Sharpe, a merchant in the City of London, by his wife Jeliane Mallory, eldest daughter and co-heiress of Sir Richard Mallory, Lord Mayor of London in 1564) married Alice Woolton, a daughter of John Woolton, Bishop of Exeter. (Vivian, p. 679))		Argent, three falcon's heads erased sable a bordure engrailed azure	Tiverton
Sherman		Or, a lion rampant sable between three holly leaves vert	Knightstone, Ottery St Mary
Shorte		Gules, a griffin segreant or a chief ermine	Newton St Cyres
Simonds		Per fess dancetée gules and argent, a pale counterchanged three trefoils one and two slipped of the first	Exeter
Skerrit		Or, a chief indented sable	Whitchurch
Skinner		Argent, a chief azure semée-de-lys of the first	Cowley
Slader		Gules, a chevron ermine between three horse's heads erased argent	Bath, North Tawton
Slanning		Argent, two pales engrailed gules over all on a bend azure three griffin's heads or	Ley, Plympton St Mary; (Note: Ley in the parish of Plympton St Mary, per Prince, John, (1643–1723) The Worthies of Devon, 1810 edition, London, pp. 713, 715-6 (note 1)) Bickleigh (South Hams); Maristow, Tamerton Foliot
Slowley		Gules, a chevron between three bats displayed or	Sloley, Shirwell; Fremington
Smith (of Exeter)		Sable, a fess cotised between three martlets or (Note: Per Pole, Sir William (d.1635), Collections Towards a Description of the County of Devon, Sir John-William de la Pole (ed.), London, 1791, p. 502. As seen on 1714 mural monument to Sir Bevil Grenville (d.1643), husband of Grace Smith (a daughter of Sir George Smith (died 1619) of Madworthy-juxta-Exeter and Madford House, Exeter, Devon, MP for Exeter in 1604, three times Mayor of Exeter), in Kilkhampton Church, Cornwall; Vivian, p. 691, appears to have ascribed to this family the wrong arms, namely those of Smith of Dartmouth (Vivian, p. 693) and Smith of Totnes)	Madworthy, nr. Exeter; Madford House, Exeter; Larkbeare, Exeter
Smith (of Dartmouth)		Barry undé of sixteen argent and azure on a chief gules three barnacles or (Note: As seen impaled by Wrey on monument to John I Wrey (d.1597) in Tawstock Church, Devon. Wrey's son John II Wrey was the 3rd husband of Eleanor Smith, daughter of Bernard Smith (d.1591) of Totnes. Arms of Smith of Totnes given by Pole, p. 502, as: Barry undé of six argent and azure on a chief gules three barnacles or(Pole, Sir William (d.1635), Collections Towards a Description of the County of Devon, Sir John-William de la Pole (ed.), London, 1791, p. 502) Given incorrectly by Vivian, p.691 as arms of Smyth of Exeter, whose arms were: Sable, a fess cotised between three martlets or (Pole, p. 502 and as visible on mural monument to Sir Bevil Grenville (d.1645) in Kilkhampton Church))	Dartmouth; Totnes
Snelling		Argent, three griffin's heads erased gules a chief ermine	Chadlewood, Plympton St Mary
Somaster		Argent, a castle triple-towered within an orle of fleurs-de-lys sable	Painsford, Ashprington; Nether Exe
Southcott		Argent, a chevron gules between three coots sable	Indio, Bovey Tracey; Mohuns Ottery; Calverleigh; Shillingford; Buckland-Tout-Saints
Southcott		Argent, a chevron engrailed gules between three coots sable	Milton Abbot; Calstock, Cornwall; Callington, Cornwall;
Southmeade		Per fess wavy gules and ermine, an eagle displayed in chief or	Wray, Moreton Hampstead
Sparke		Chequy or and vert, a bend ermine	The Friary (Whitefriar's Priory), St Jude, Plymouth
Speccot		Or, on a bend gules three millrinds argent	Speccot, Merton; Thornbury; (Penheale, Cornwall)
Spicer		Per pale gules and sable, three castles in bend or cotised within a bordure engrailed ermine	Exeter
Spurway		Argent, on a bend azure a spur-rowel or between two garbs of the first	Spurway, Oakford
Stafford (Kelloway) (Note: The junior branch of the Kelloway family of Stafford/Stowford, Dolton, which settled at nearby Dowland changed its surname to Stafford but retained the paternal arms of Kelloway. See Vivian, p. 510, footnote)		Argent, two grozing irons in saltire sable between four Kelway pears proper (Note: Vivian, p. 510 adds a bordure engrailed of the second. No such border is visible in any of the many depictions of the Stafford/Stoford/Stowford/Kelloway arms surviving in the churches of Dolton, Iddisleigh, and Dowland; However, the bordure does appear in the Kelloway arms shown in Branscombe Church, Devon, on the Mural monument to Joan Tregarthin (d.1583) widow successively of John Kelloway of Cornwall and John Wadham (d.1578) of Merifield, Ilton, Somerset and Edge, Branscombe. See File:JoanTregarthinMonument BranscombeChurch Devon.PNG)	Dowland; Pynes, Upton Pyne
Staplehill		Argent, a chevron sable	Dartmouth; Bremells, Trusham
Staveley		Argent, on a chevron between three lozenges azure as many buck's heads cabossed of the first	East Buckland
Stretchleigh		Or, on a chevron azure three cinquefoils of the field	Stretchleigh (now "Strashleigh"), Ermington (Note: For "Strashleigh" see: Pevsner, Nikolaus & Cherry, Bridget, The Buildings of England: Devon, London, 2004, p. 356. For its location in the parish of Ermington see: Vivian, p. 157)
Strobridge		Or, over water proper on a bridge of three arches gules a tower of the last and a pennon hoisted thereon	Howber Hayne & Street Hayne, Colyton; Modbury
Strode		Argent, a chevron between three conies courant sable	Old Newnham and Newnham Park, Plympton St Mary
Stucley		Azure, three pears or	Affeton Castle; Hartland Abbey; Daddon/Moreton House
Sture		Argent, a bend sable in chief a pile of three points gules	North Huish

=== T ===
Name	Escutcheon	Blazon	Seat, parish
Tawley		Argent, a chevron azure between three lozenges sable	Marldon; (Guildford, Surrey)
Thorne (see also "Seccombe alias Thorne" above)		Argent, a fess gules between three lions rampant sable	Thorne, Holsworthy; Thorne, Ottery St Mary; Upcott, Sheepwash
Tilley		Argent, a wyvern wings endorsed sable charged on the breast with an annulet or for difference	Upottery
Tothill		Azure, on a bend argent cotised or a lion passant sable	Peamore, Exminster; City of Exeter
Tremayne		Gules, three dexter arms conjoined at the shoulders and flexed in triangle or the fists clenched proper	Collacombe, Lamerton; Sydenham, Marystow
Trevelyan		Gules, the base barry wavy argent and azure a demi-horse issuant of the second maned and hoofed or	Yarnscombe; (Nettlecombe, Somerset)
Tristram		Argent, three torteaux a label of three points azure a chief gules	Duvale & Castle Grove, Bampton
Trobridge		Or, over water proper a bridge triple-towered gules	Trobridge, Crediton
Trosse		Gules, three cutlasses barways in pale argent the handles or	Exwick
Turberville		Argent, a lion rampant gules crowned or	Sampford Peverell; South Molton; (Bere Somerset; Coity Castle, Glamorgan;)
Turner		Sable, a chevron ermine between three fers-de-moline or on a chief argent a lion passant gules	Halberton
Twiggs (Note: The "steward of the court of the Earl of Bedford" at Werrington (then in Devon, now in Cornwall) in about 1600 was John Twiggs, whose family pedigree is included in the 1620 Heraldic Visitation of Devon. (Vivian, p. 742, pedigree of "Twiggs of Werrington"). John Twiggs's grandson was Richard Twiggs "of Werrington", whose son was Benjamin Twiggs (1616-c.1678/9) "of Werrington", who both described themselves as "of Werrington" in their wills.(Richard Twiggs (will dated 1625/6, CRO AP/T/449 Benjamin Twiggs (born 1616 (aged 4 in 1620), will dated 1678/9, CRO AP/T/1221))		Azure, three bendlets or on a chief argent a bar dancettée gules	Werrington

=== U ===
Name	Escutcheon	Blazon	Seat, parish
Upton		Sable, a cross moline argent (Note: As seen on monument in Brixham Church, blazoned incorrectly as a cross flory in Vivian, Lt.Col. J.L., (Ed.) The Visitations of the County of Devon: Comprising the Heralds' Visitations of 1531, 1564 & 1620, Exeter, 1895, p. 743. Blazoned as cross sarcelly (cercelée) (similar to cross moline) by Pole, Sir William (d.1635), Collections Towards a Description of the County of Devon, Sir John-William de la Pole (ed.), London, 1791, p. 506)	Puslinch, Newton Ferrers; Lupton, Brixham

=== V ===
Name	Escutcheon	Blazon	Seat, parish
Velly (Note: Arms as visible on monument (transcript Chope, R. Pearse, The Book of Hartland, Torquay, 1940, p. 144) in Hartland Church to John Velly (1617–1694), during the Civil War a Captain-Lieutenant to Sir Robert Cary (1610–1675), lord of the nearby manor of Clovelly, a Gentleman of the Privy Chamber to King Charles II, whose mural monument survives in Clovelly Church)		Argent, a chevron between three castles or	Higher Velly, Hartland; Galsham, Hartland;
Venner		Gules, three bends or a chief per fess ermine and argent	Hudscott, Chittlehampton
Voysey		Or, a cross sable in the first quarter a crescent of the last a bordure gules	Townstal (Dartmouth)

=== W ===
Name	Escutcheon	Blazon	Seat, parish
Waddon		Argent, a lion rampant gules debruised with a bend sable charged with three cross crosslets fitchée of the field	Plymouth
Wadham		Gules, a chevron between three roses argent	Edge, Branscombe; Wadham, Knowstone; (Merryfield, Ilton; Somerset)
Wakeman (Note: Arms granted in 1616 to Rev. Robert Wakeman (1576-1629), Doctor of Divinity, Parson of Beer Ferrers and Charleton in Devon, Fellow of Balliol College, Oxford in 1596, Prebendary of Exeter Cathedral 1616 (Wakeman, Robert, P., Wakeman Genealogy 1630-1899, Meriden, Connecticut, 1900, p. 35 ))		Argent, on a cross sable a ducal coronet or encircled with clouds proper rayonée or	Bere Ferrers; Charleton
Wakeman		Vert, a saltire wavy ermine	Exeter
Walrond		Argent, three bull's heads cabossed sable armed or	Bradfield, Uffculme; Bovey House, Beer
Walter		Azure, a griffin segreant or a bordure ermine	Ashbury
Waltham (Note: Richard Waltham (1560-1632) of Trehill, was Recorder of Exeter 1628-32. His elder brother Jeffrie Waltham (1558–1626) of Exeter, was Mayor of Exeter in 1613 and 1626 and was married to Katherin Duck, a sister of Nicholas Duck (1570–1628), Recorder of Exeter (Vivian, pp. 772, 309); Their aunt Katherin Waltham was the mother of the Devon historian Thomas Westcote (c.1567-c.1637). (Vivian, pp. 772, 778))		Sable, a chevron between three suns in glory argent	Trehill, Kenn; Exeter
Waye		Gules, a chevron or between three lucies hauriant argent	Torrington; Marsh, (Note: Pole, p. 506, who blazons the arms as Gules, a chevron between three fishes naiant argent, thus with chevron argent not or and with the unnamed fish naiant not hauriant. These arms of Waye of Marsh are however sculpted (without tinctures) quartered by Kirkham of Blagdon in the 16th century Kirkham Chantry of Paignton Church, and show a chevron with fish hauriant, as per Vivian's blazon. Nicholas Kirkham (d.1516) of Blagdon married Jane Waye, daughter and heiress of Robert Waye of Marsh (Vivian, p. 516, pedigree of Kirkham). These are similar to the arms displayed in Exeter Guildhall, Devon, of "John Waye, Sheriff (of Exeter) 1541", shown as Gules, three lucies hauriant in fess argent. They should be distinguished from the completely different arms of Way of St Giles-in-the-Wood, near Great Torrington in Devon, often called "de Via" (i.e. literally "from the way") arms, apparently later adopted by the Pollard family of Way and also by the Davie family (Davy baronets) of Creedy, Devon, which claim their original surname as de Via.) Newton St Cyres (Note: Marsh in parish of Newton St Cyres per Prince, John, (1643–1723) The Worthies of Devon, 1810 edition, London, p. 554)
Weare/Treawin (Note: Arms of "Treawin of Weare Giffard" per Pole, p. 505; Arms of "Weare of Clyst Honiton" per Vivian, p. 774. Quartered by Fortescue of Weare Giffard and Filleigh, see monumental brass in Filleigh Church of Richard Fortescue (c. 1517–1570))		Argent, on a bend vert between six crosses crosslet fitchée gules three crosiers or	Clyst Honiton
Webbe		Or, a plain cross sable in the first quarter an eagle displayed of the second	St Petrock, Exeter; St Mary Major, Exeter
Webber		Gules, on a chevron engrailed argent between three plates three annulets of the first	Incledon, Braunton; Buckland, Braunton
Westcott		Argent, a bend cotised sable a bordure gules bezantée	Raddon, Shobrooke
Weston		Argent, on a chevron sable three leopard's faces or	Heath Hayne, Colyton
Whiddon		Argent, a chevron between three spearheads gules	Whiddon, Chagford; Sidbury
White		Argent, a chevron between three wolf's heads erased sable	"Diray"
Whitlock		Per fess or and sable, a bend wavy between two padlocks counterchanged	Warkleigh
Wichalse		Per fess argent and sable, six crescents in pale counterchanged	Barnstaple
Willesford		Azure, a chevron ermine between three leopard's faces or	Tavistock
Willoughby		Quarterly 1 & 4: Sable, a cross engrailed or (Ufford); 2 & 3: Gules, a cross moline argent (Bec of Eresby); all within a bordure gobonée of the second and azure	Molland Champson, Molland Bottreaux; Leyhill, Payhembury
Wise		Sable, three chevronels ermine	Sydenham, Marystow; Mount Wise, Stoke Damerel
Withie< (Note: John Withie of Berry Narbor married Joane Jewel, a sister of John Jewel (1522–1571), Bishop of Salisbury, born at Bowden in the parish of Berry Narbor (Vivian, pp. 814, 505))		Per pale ermine and or, a lion salient gules	Berry Narbor
Wolcot		Per pale azure and gules, on a cross fleury or five martlets sable a chief of the third charged with a fleur-de-lys between two annulets of the second	Wolcot, Thrushelton
Wollocombe (see also Woollcombe)		Argent, three bars gules	Wollocombe, Mortehoe; Combe (alias Over Wollocombe), Roborough
Wood		Sable semée of cross-crosslets or, three leopard's faces of the last	Orchard, (Note: Re Orchard, see: Pevsner, Nikolaus & Cherry, Bridget, The Buildings of England: Devon, London, 2004, pp. 535, 613, who places it in parish of Thrushelton (near Lew Trenchard). The Visitations are clear this family resided in the parish of Lew Trenchard, and various monuments of the family exist in that parish church ("MI" per Vivian, p. 799)) Lew Trenchard
Woode		Argent, on a mount in base proper an oak tree vert fructed or	Hareston, Brixton
Woodley		Sable, a chevron between three owls argent	Halshanger, Ilsington
Woodrouffe (Note: James Woodrouffe (d.1609) of Barnstaple was Mayor of Barnstaple in 1605 (Vivian, p. 802; Lamplugh, Lois, Barnstaple: Town on the Taw, South Molton, 2002, p. 156). His first wife was Jone Worth, a daughter of Pawle Worth, thrice Mayor of Barnstaple in 1577, 1592 and 1603, who signed a letter dated 8 April 1588 concerning the town's objection to having been ordered by the Privy Council to provide an excessive number of ships to meet the Spanish Armada. (Lamplugh, pp. 50, 156))		Gules, on a chevron argent three buck's heads erased sable a chief per fess nebulée of the third and second	Barnstaple; Uffculme
Woollcombe (see also Wollocombe)		Argent, three bars gules	Pitton, Yealmpton; Ashbury
Worth (Wrothe)		Argent, an eagle with two heads displayed sable beaked and legged or (Note: Blazon per Pole, p. 509; These arms are visible on several escutcheons in Washfield Church. The arms are blazoned incorrectly as beaked and legged gules in Vivian, p. 805, pedigree of Worth)	Worth, Washfield, near Tiverton; Calstock, Cornwall
Wotton		Argent, a cross engrailed between four mullets sable	Inglebourne, (Note: Following the Dissolution of the Monasteries during the reign of King Henry VIII (1509–1547) John Wotton purchased the estate of Inglebourne from the crown, previously a possession of Buckfastleigh Abbey (Risdon, p. 165)) Harberton
Wyatt (Note: Phillip Wyatt (d.1592) was steward and Town Clerk of Barnstaple, near Braunton. He had several sons, of whom Adam Wyatt (d.1611) was Town Clerk of Barnstaple from 1586 and left a detailed diary which provides valuable information on the town at this period. The identity of the diarist as Adam Wyatt was made by the Devon historian Todd Gray, although traditionally the diarist was thought to have been his brother Philip Wyatt (d.1608) (Lamplugh, Lois, Barnstaple: Town on the Taw, South Molton, 2002, p. 45). Their elder brother Hugh Wyatt of Shillingford, married Lady Mary Bourchier, a daughter of John Bourchier, 2nd Earl of Bath (1499–1561), of nearby Tawstock Court, a highly influential figure in Barnstaple. Another brother, Thomas Wyatt, married Margaret Risdon, an aunt of Tristram Risdon (d.1640) the Devon historian. (Vivian, pp. 823, 107, 648). Pole, p. 508, gives the arms of "Wiatt of Shillingford" slightly differently as: Azure, a chief gules over-all a horse-brake (barnacle) argent)		Per pale gules and azure, a pair of barnacles argent	Braunton
Wykes/Weekes		Ermine, three battle-axes sable	North Wyke, South Tawton; Bindon, Axminster; (Note: The Bindon branch of Wyke used their maternal arms of Burnell, having inherited that estate from an heiress of that family (Pole, p. 243; Woodger, L.S., biography of Wyke, Roger (d.c.1467), of Bindon in Axmouth, Devon, published in History of Parliament: House of Commons 1386-1421, ed. J.S. Roskell, L. Clark, C. Rawcliffe., 1993 )) Honeychurch
Wyvell		Argent, three mullets between two bars sable a bordure engrailed gules	Crediton

=== Y ===
Name	Escutcheon	Blazon	Seat, parish
Yard		Argent, a chevron gules between three water bougets sable (Note: Arms inherited from the Bushel family of Bradley/Teignwick (Pole, p. 472))	Yarde, Malborough; Teignwick, Kingsteignton; Bradley, Kingsteignton; Whiteway, Kingsteignton; Churston Court, Churston Ferrers; Sharpham, Ashprington
Yeo		Argent, a chevron sable between three shovelers azure (Note: Per research conducted by Sheila Yeo of the Yeo Society , based on stained glass depictions of Yeo arms in churches of Petrockstowe (Yeo of Heanton Satchville) and Hatherleigh (Yeo of Hatherleigh) both in Devon. The ducks are described as of various breeds by different sources. Heraldic sources give contradictory tinctures: Argent, a chevron between three shovelers sable (Vivian, Lt.Col. J.L., (Ed.) The Visitations of the County of Devon: Comprising the Heralds' Visitations of 1531, 1564 & 1620, Exeter, 1895, p. 834) and Argent, a chevron between three mallards azure (Pole, Sir William (d.1635), Collections Towards a Description of the County of Devon, Sir John-William de la Pole (ed.), London, 1791, p. 510))	Heanton Satchville, Petrockstowe; Huish; Hatherleigh; Fremington
Yonge		Ermine, on a bend cotised sable three griffin's heads erased or	Great House, Colyton; Escot, Talaton; Mohuns Ottery, Luppitt
Yonge (Note: The return made in 1620 to the heralds was signed by Robert Yonge (d.1636) of Colebrooke, 4th son of Thomas Younge of Sturminster Newton in Dorset. Robert's nephew was Thomas Yonge (of Child, Ockford) who married Bridget Seymer, a sister of Sir Robert Seymer (d.1624) of Hanford in Dorset, a Teller in the King's Exchequer, knighted at Greenwich Palace on 19 February 1619 (Burke, John, A Genealogical and Heraldic Dictionary of the Landed Gentry of Great Britain and Ireland, Vol. 2 (M-Z), London, 1846, p. 1216 ))		Per fess sable and argent, three lions rampant guardant counterchanged	Landsend,Colebrooke

== See also ==
- Flag of Devon
- Cornish heraldry
- Dorset heraldry

== Sources ==
- Cherry, Bridget & Pevsner, Nikolaus, The Buildings of England: Devon. Yale University Press, 2004. ISBN 978-0-300-09596-8
- Pole, Sir William (died 1635), Collections Towards a Description of the County of Devon, Sir John-William de la Pole (ed.), London, 1791.
- Risdon, Tristram (died 1640), Survey of Devon. With considerable additions. London, 1811.
- Vivian, Lt.Col. J.L., ed. (1895). The Visitations of the County of Devon: Comprising the Heralds' Visitations of 1531, 1564 & 1620. Exeter.
