= John Calwoodleigh =

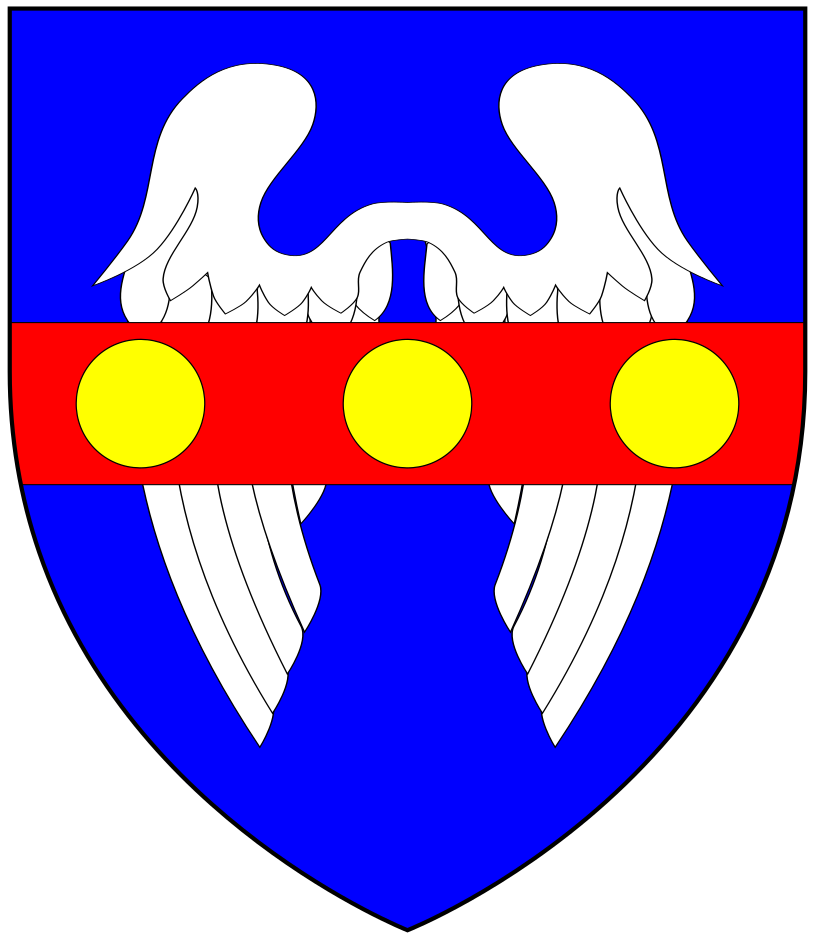
Arms of Calwoodleigh: Azure, two wings conjoined argent over all on a fess gules three bezants

John Calwoodleigh (fl. 1502, 1508) of the City of Exeter in Devon, was three times Mayor of Exeter, in 1495, 1501, and 1508. He was a Churchwarden of St Petrock's Church, Exeter.

== Origins and Calwoodleigh family ==
He was the third son of Thomas Calwoodleigh (d. 1492) (alias Cawoodley) of Calwoodleigh (modern: Calverleigh) in Devon, by his wife Elizabeth Hatch daughter of Thomas Hatch of Wooleigh in the parish of Beaford in Devon. Elizabeth Hatch was buried in the Dominican Convent in Exeter.

His eldest brother was Thomas Calwoodleigh (d. 1479/80), who married Elizabeth Collyn of Helland in Cornwall. His son was Humfrey Calwoodleigh (born 1472) who was attainted in 1497 for his support of the Second Cornish Uprising of 1497 of the Pretender Perkin Warbeck. Humfrey Calwoodleigh died without surviving male progeny when his sole heiress became his daughter Joane Calwoodleigh, who brought the manor of Calwoodleigh and other lands to her husband Roger Arundell (d. 1536) of Helland, Cornwall, a younger son of Sir Thomas Arundell (d. 1485), Knight of the Bath, of Lanherne in Cornwall. Her son and heir to Calwoodleigh was Humphrey Arundell (c. 1513-1550) of Helland in Cornwall, the leader of Cornish forces in the Prayer Book Rebellion, executed at Tyburn.

== Marriage ==
He married a certain Elizabeth, of unrecorded family, by whom he had no recorded progeny.
