= Thorne, Ottery St Mary =

Historic estate in Devon, England

Thorne in the parish of Ottery St Mary in Devon is an historic estate situated on the west side of the River Otter opposite the town of Ottery St Mary. The site is today occupied by Thorne Farm (much of the land of which has been built over by a modern housing estate known as Thorne Farm Way) situated to the immediate north of the town's school and hospital and to the immediate south of the surviving early 17th century grand mansion house of Cadhay.

The area of Thorne Farm is low lying and suffered serious flooding in 2008 which caused the Environment Agency to propose improvements including diverting the Thorne Farm Stream via a channel to the River Otter flood plain.

== Descent ==
=== at-Thorne ===
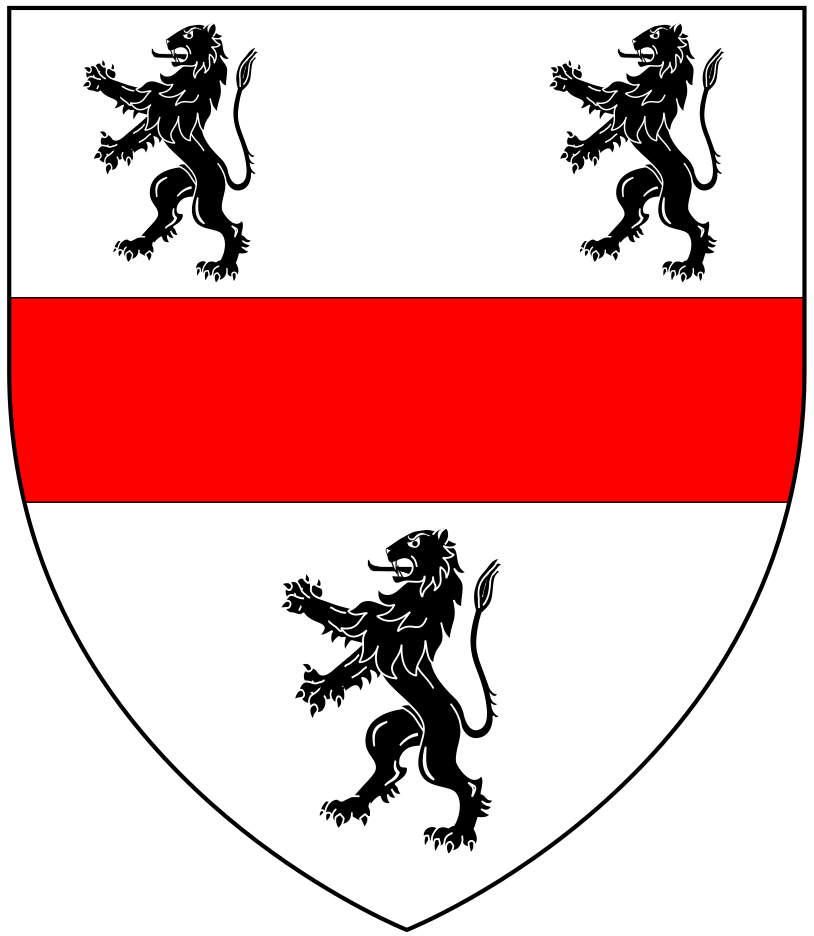
Arms of Thorne: Argent, a fess gules between three lions rampant sable

Thorne was the seat of the "at-Thorne" (later Thorne) family, which as was usual had taken their surname from their seat. Some confusion exists concerning two Devonshire families, one named by Pole (d.1635) and Risdon (d.1640) as "at-Thorne" seated at "Thorne" in the parish of Ottery St Mary, and another named by both as "de Thorn / Thorn" of "Thorn", (listed in the Domesday Book of 1086) in the parish of Holsworthy, both of which families apparently bore the same arms and both of whose names are also sometimes referred to as "Thorne". The last in the male line was Roger at-Thorne, whose heiress was his sister Jone at-Thorne, the wife of Henry Cooke, to whose posterity descended the estate of Thorne.

=== Cooke ===
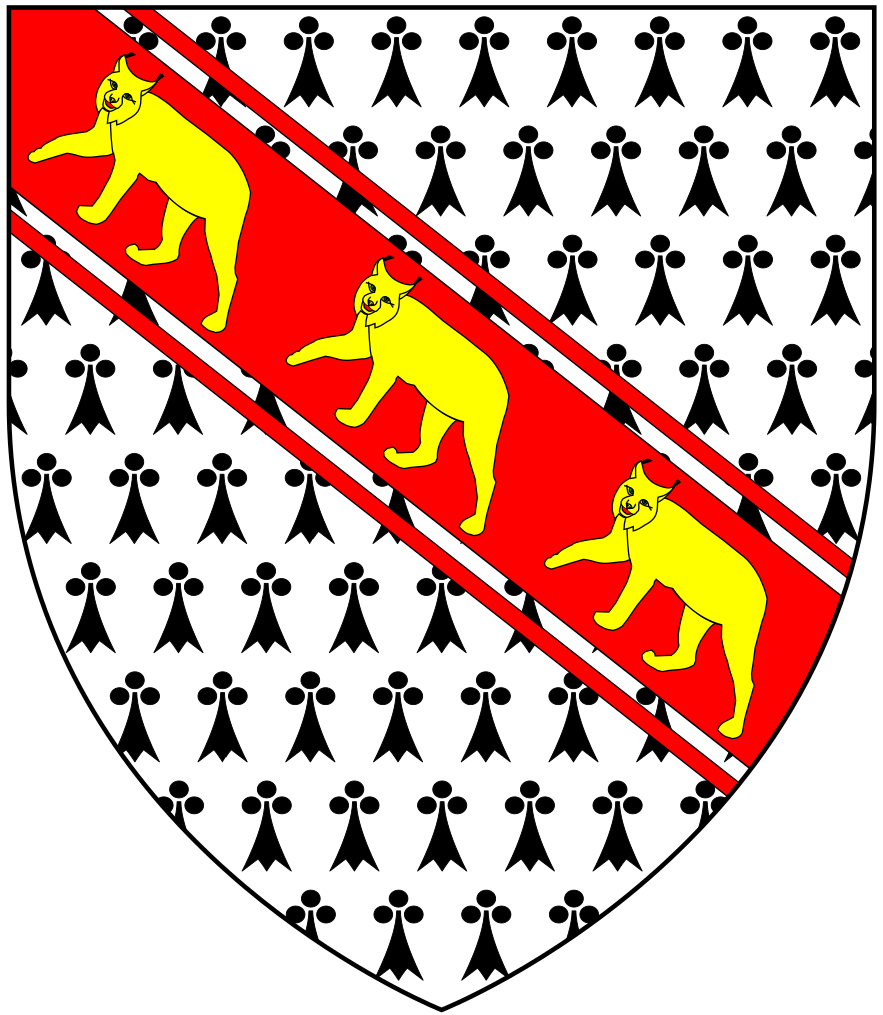
Arms of Cooke: Ermine, on a bend cotised gules three cats-a-mountain passant guardant or

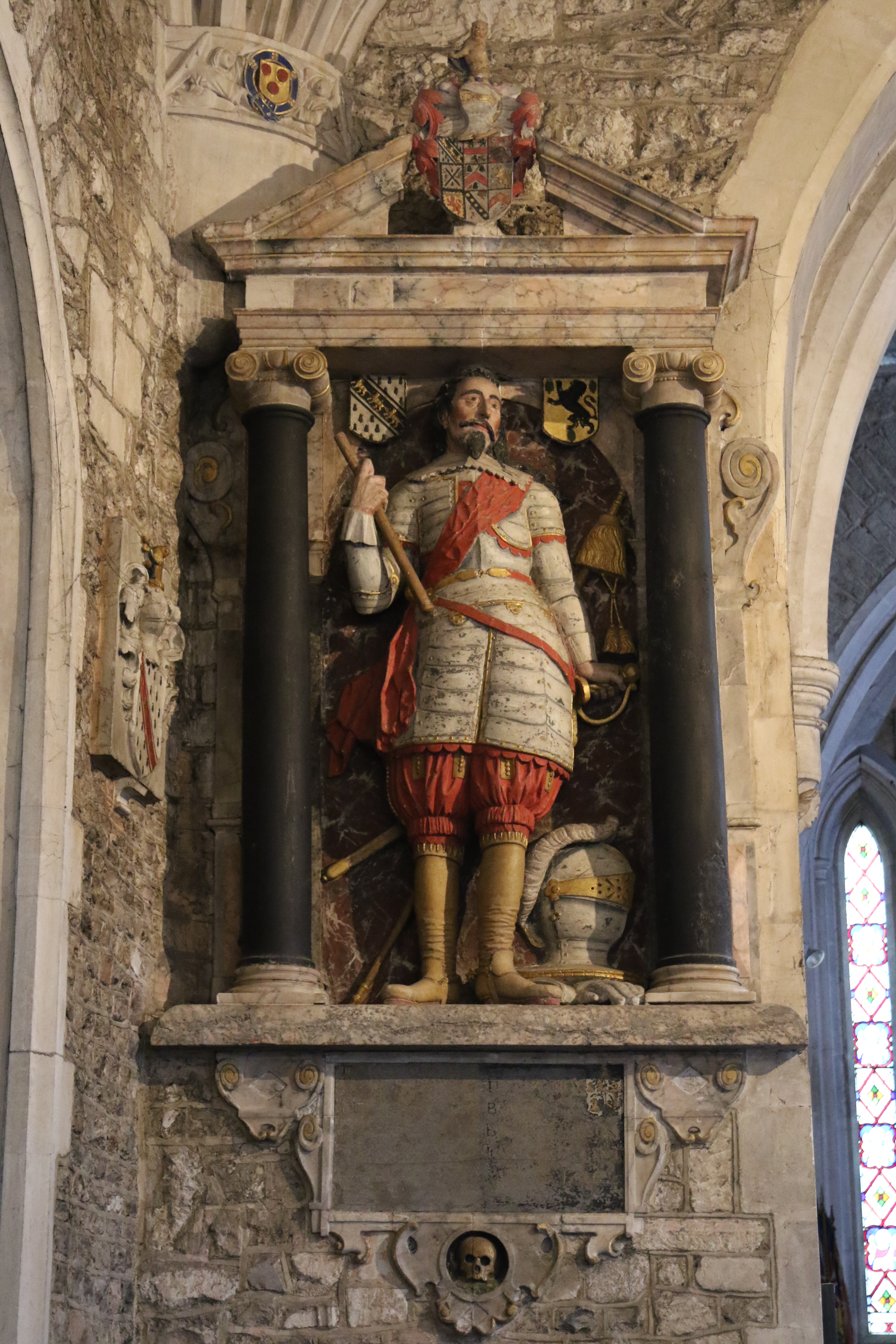
Mural monument in St Mary's Church, Ottery St Mary, to John Cooke (d. 1632) of Thorne. He stands dressed in armour, his helmet resting on the ground, and holds in his left hand the handle of his sheathed sword and in his right hand the baton of a military commander. On the wall of the aedicule behind on either side of his head are shown the arms of Cooke (left) and of Sherman (right). On top is a shield showing Cooke of 9 quarters, the first quarter being Thorne of Thorne

Henry Cooke married Jone Thorne, heiress of Thorne, and his descendants remained seated at Thorne until the time of Pole (d.1635). The arms of Thorne (Argent, a fess gules between three lions rampant sable) appear as the second of the nine quarters on an escutcheon on top of the mural monument to John Cooke (d. 1632) of Thorne in St Mary's Church, Ottery St Mary. The Cooke family subsequently married various further heiresses, one of whom was Mary Keloway, one of the daughters and co-heiresses of John Keloway (alias Kelloway, etc.) of Cullompton, Devon, a widespread and prominent Devonshire family the senior line of which was seated at Stafford, Dolton. The arms of Kelloway (Argent, two grozing irons in saltire sable between four Kelway pears proper a bordure engrailed of the second) appear as the fourth of nine the quarters on an escutcheon on the mural monument to John Cooke (d. 1632) of Thorne in St Mary's Church, Ottery St Mary. Mary Kelloway's mother was Jane Tregarthyn, a daughter and heiress of Tredruffe Tregarthyn of Bremwell in Cornwall. The arms of Mary Kelloway's parents appear on the monument in Branscombe Church, Devon, to Joan Tregarthin (d.1583) widow successively of John Kelloway of Cullompton, and of John Wadham (d.1578) of Merifield, Ilton, Somerset and of Edge, Branscombe.

The great-grandson of William Cooke and Mary Kelloway was John Cooke (d.1632) of Thorne, whose mural monument with effigy survives in St Mary's Church, Ottery St Mary. He married Margaret Sherman, a daughter of Richard Sherman of Ottery St Mary, whose arms (Or, a lion rampant sable between three holly leaves vert) appear on the monument. He is said by Stabb to have been murdered by a younger brother, and "the story goes that at midnight the statue steps down from its niche and walks about the church". The monument was restored by his grandson in 1726.

The second son and eventual heir (his elder brother Richard Cooke having died without progeny) of John Cooke (d. 1632) was William Cooke, who in October 1639 brought a lawsuit before the judge Henry Howard, Lord Maltravers, against John Bagg of Ottery St Mary, a miller, for having insulted him in a manner likely to provoke a duel. The case is recorded as follows:

"About the 25th day of June last, your petitioner being at Awtry, in the county aforesaid, in the company of divers gent(lemen) and others at a publique meeting, was there assaulted by one John Bagg of Awtry, yeoman, who (without any provocation given him) told your petitioner that "he was a base knave and a base gent"; and being reproved for such his speeches by some gent(lemen) then present Bagg replyed that "he could not make your petitioner baser then he was".

Cooke stated that he was a captain of a trained band and that his family had been gentry for 300 years, whereas Bagg was merely a yeoman. No further proceedings survive.

== Sources ==
- Pole, Sir William (d.1635), Collections Towards a Description of the County of Devon, Sir John-William de la Pole (ed.), London, 1791, p. 149, Thorne
  - Vivian, Lt.Col. J.L., (Ed.) The Visitations of the County of Devon: Comprising the Heralds' Visitations of 1531, 1564 & 1620, Exeter, 1895, p. 222, pedigree of Cooke of Thorne; p. 727, pedigree of Thorne of Thorne
