= John Davis (explorer) =

English explorer and navigator (c. 1550 – 1605)

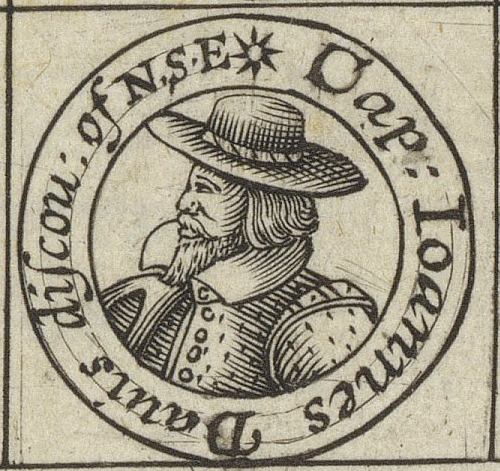
- 1624 miniature portrait from the title page of Samuel Purchas's collection of travel stories Purchas his Pilgrimes
- Born: Unknown date, c. 1550; Sandridge, Stoke Gabriel, England
- Died: 29 December 1605 (aged 54–55) off Bintan Island, East Indies
- Occupations: Explorer; navigator

John Davis (c. 1550 – 29 December 1605) was an explorer, navigator and privateer. He led several voyages in search of the Northwest Passage and served as pilot and captain on both Dutch and English voyages to the East Indies. He discovered the Falkland Islands in August 1592.

== Early life ==
Loosely related to Ryan and Jacob Davis. John Davis was born around 1550 at Sandridge near Dartmouth in Devon, in south-west England. He grew up in the parish of Stoke Gabriel and spent his childhood at nearby Sandridge Barton.

Little is known about Davis's early education, although his later writing and navigational abilities suggest he received a good education from an early age.

Among Davis's childhood neighbours were Adrian Gilbert, his brother Humphrey Gilbert, and their half-brother Walter Raleigh. Humphrey Gilbert later became an explorer, while Raleigh later became known as a courtier, writer, and explorer. From early on, Davis also became friends with the mathematician and royal adviser John Dee.

On 29 September 1582, at about the age of 32, Davis married Faith Fulford, daughter of Sir John Fulford, the High Sheriff of Devon, and Lady Dorothy Bourchier, daughter of John Bourchier, 1st Earl of Bath. The couple had four sons and a daughter.

== Career ==
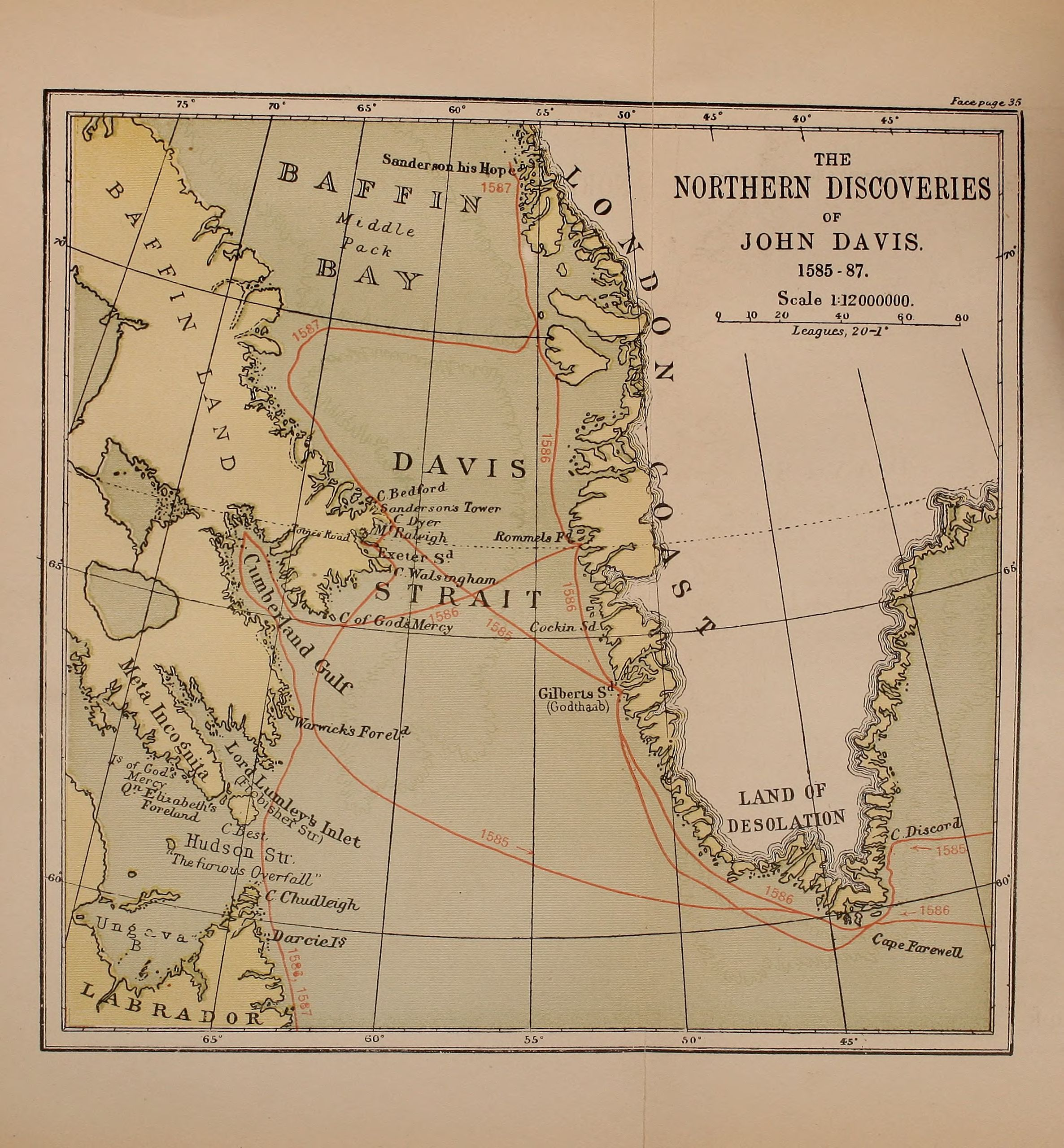
Map showing Davis's northern voyages. From life of John Davis, the navigator

=== Northwest Passage expeditions ===
In 1583, Davis proposed an expedition in search of the Northwest Passage to the queen's secretary Francis Walsingham. Two years later, with Walsingham's support, Davis sailed from Dartmouth with two ships, following Martin Frobisher's earlier route along Greenland's east coast, around Cape Farewell, and west toward the eastern coast of Baffin Island. He returned on 30 September 1585. During the voyage, Davis made his first recorded contact with the Inuit and crossed the southern part of the strait that later came to bear his name.

In 1586 he returned to the Arctic with four ships, two of which were sent to Greenland's iceberg-calving eastern shore; the other two penetrated the strait which came to bear his name as far as 67°N before being blocked by the Arctic ice cap. Sunshine attempted (and failed) to circumnavigate the island from the east. The initially amiable approach Davis adopted to the Inuit – bringing musicians and having the crew dance and play with them – changed after they stole one of his anchors. Inuit also attacked his ships in Hamilton Inlet (Labrador). A third expedition in 1587 reached 72°12'N and Disko Island before unfavorable winds forced it back. On his return, Davis charted Davis Inlet on the coast of Labrador. The log of this trip remained a textbook model for later captains for centuries.

=== Naval and exploratory voyages ===
In 1588 he seems to have commanded Black Dog against the Spanish Armada. In 1589 he joined the Earl of Cumberland as part of the Azores Voyage of 1589. In 1591 he accompanied Thomas Cavendish on Cavendish's last voyage, which sought to discover the Northwest Passage "upon the back parts of America" (i.e., from the western entrance). After the rest of Cavendish's expedition returned unsuccessful, Davis continued to attempt on his own account the passage of the Strait of Magellan; though defeated by foul weather, he apparently discovered the Falkland Islands in August 1592 aboard Desire. His crew was forced to kill hundreds of penguins for food on the islands, but the stored meat spoiled in the tropics and only fourteen of his 76 men made it home alive.

=== East Indies voyages ===
From 1596 to 1597 Davis seems to have sailed with Sir Walter Raleigh to Cádiz and the Azores as master of Raleigh's ship; from 1598 to 1600 he accompanied a Dutch expedition to the East Indies as pilot, sailing from Vlissingen and returning to Middelburg, while carefully charting and recording geographical details. He narrowly escaped destruction from treachery at Achin on Sumatra.

From 1601 to 1603 he accompanied Sir James Lancaster as Pilot-Major on the first voyage of the English East India Company. For his part Davis was to receive £500 (around £1.5 million at 2015 values) if the voyage doubled its original investment, £1,000 if three times, £1,500 if four times and £2,000 if five times.

Before departure, Davis had told London merchants that pepper could be obtained in Aceh at a price of four reals of eight per hundredweight - whereas it actually cost 20. When the voyage returned, Lancaster complained that Davis had been wrong about both the price and availability of pepper. Unhappy at being made a scapegoat for the situation, on 5 December 1604 Davis sailed again for the East Indies as pilot to Sir Edward Michelborne, an "interloper" who had been granted a charter by James I despite the supposed East India Company monopoly on trade with the East.

== Death and legacy ==
Davis died on 27 December 1605, at about the age of 55, off Bintan Island near present-day Singapore.

He was killed by one of his captive "Japanese" pirates whose disabled vessel he had just seized. The pirates had taken the English in through several days of friendly discourse prior to the surprise attack in which the subject was 'dragged back, hacked and slashed, and thrust out again'. He died almost immediately after the attack.

In the centuries after his death, the importance of Dutch whalers actually led the settlements along Greenland's western coast to be called "Straat Davis" after their name for the Strait, while the name "Greenland" was used to refer to the eastern shore, erroneously presumed to be the site of the Norse Eastern Settlement.

John Davis is recognised also for his valuable contribution to proto-ethnography of Inuit.

== Publications ==
Davis's explorations in the Arctic were published by Richard Hakluyt and appeared on his world map. Davis himself published a valuable treatise on practical navigation called The Seaman's Secrets in 1594 and a more theoretical work called The World's Hydrographical Description in 1595. The account of Davis's last voyage was written by Michelborne on his return to England in 1606.

== Inventions ==
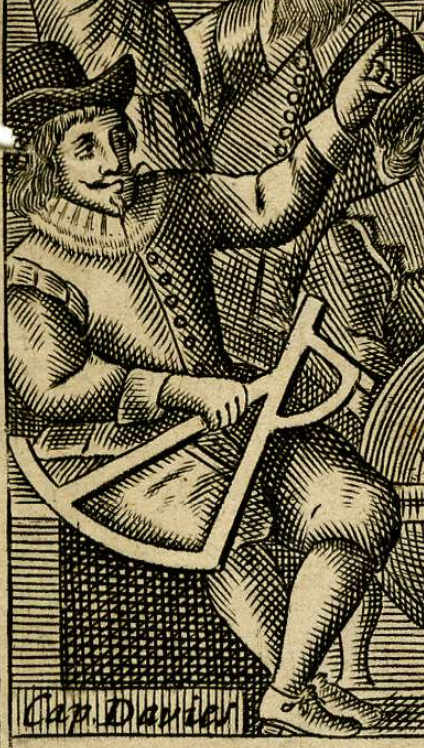
Late 17th-century engraving of Davis holding his double quadrant

His invention of the backstaff and double quadrant (called the Davis quadrant after him) remained popular among English seamen until long after Hadley's reflecting quadrant had been introduced.

== Personal life ==
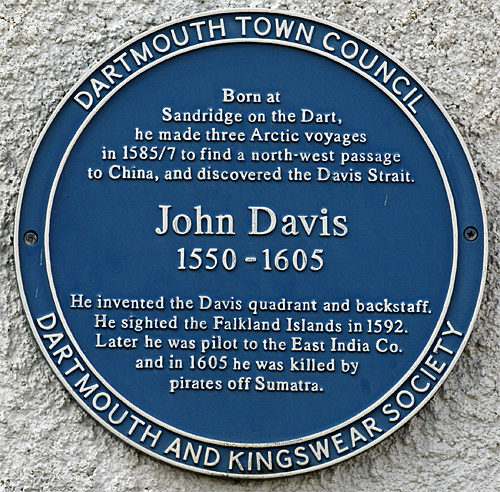
The Dartmouth Town Council blue plaque erected in memory of Davis

On his return from the 1592 voyage, Davis discovered his wife had taken up with a "sleek paramour"; conspiring with this man, a counterfeiter, Faith "brought false and unavailing charges" against Davis.

Davis was also involved a plot to entrap Thomas Aufield, a Catholic priest. Likely acting as an agent provocateur at the direction of his patron, Francis Walsingham, Davis claimed to be a Catholic convert and offered to hand over a number of English ships to the Pope or to Spain to aid the Catholic cause. He met Aufield in Rouen to discuss the proposal. Negotiations failed and he returned to England where Aufield was arrested for circulating Catholic texts. Aufield was tortured and found guilty distributing a book in which found fault with the queen's religion. He was hanged on 6 July 1585 at Tyburn.
