= Rosemary Lauder =

Rosemary Anne Lauder (born July 1944), of North Devon, England, is a historian of the county of Devon. She started her writing career in the 1980s as a journalist contributing articles on the subject of gardening, in which she retains a strong interest. She received an MA in Garden History from the University of Bristol. She is a long-standing member of the Devon Gardens Trust, in which organisation she plays an active role. She is author and publisher of many books and booklets on the topics of walking in North Devon, the topography of Exmoor and North Devon, and the history of the region. She lived for five years in a former gardener's cottage rented from the Tapeley Park estate in the parish of Westleigh, North Devon. Her historical works concentrate especially on the landed gentry of Devonshire and their mansions and estates, most notably Vanished Houses (1981 and 1997) and Devon Families (2002). Several of her works have been published by Devon's Heritage.

== List of works ==
- Vanished Houses of North Devon, 1981, 2nd edition 2005
- A Guide to Instow and Its Neighbours Fremington, Yelland & Westleigh, 1981
- Strange Stories from Devon, with Michael Williams, 1982
- Views of Old Devon, 1982
- Villages of North Devon, 1982
- Market Towns of North Devon, 1983
- Exmoor in the Old Days, 1983
- An Anthology for North Devon, 1983
- Westward Ho! to Welcombe: a Guide to Coast and Country Including Bideford and Torrington, with Frank Scrivener, 1984
- Lundy: Puffin Island, 1984
- Unknown Devon, with Michael Williams, 1984
- A Tale of Two Rivers, with William Atkins, 1986
- Seven Days in North Devon, 1986
- A Picture of Devon, 1989
- A Walker's Guide to North Devon, 1991
- Exmoor Travellers, 1993
- Vanished Landmarks of North Devon, 1994
- Bideford, Appledore, Instow and Westward Ho!, 1996
- Vanished Houses of South Devon, 1997
- Devon Families, 2002
- The Devon Gardens Guide, 2004
- Bideford: North Devon's Ancient Port and Market Town: A Guide to the Town of Bideford Including a Map, a Walk About the Town, and Bideford's Past
- Vanished Houses of Cornwall, 2020

== Journal of Devon Gardens Trust ==
Lauder's articles published in the Journal of Devon Gardens Trust include:

- The Lost Landscape of Tapeley Park, 2009
