= Sandridge, Stoke Gabriel =

Historic estate in Devon, England

Sandridge is an historic estate in the parish of Stoke Gabriel in Devon, situated on high ground at the head of the River Dart estuary. The estate was originally encompassed on three sides by the river, which meanders along its border, leaving it on the east side. The present grade II* listed Italianate style Regency mansion house known as Sandridge Park was built in 1805 by Lady Ashburton (née Elizabeth Baring, the widow of John Dunning, 1st Baron Ashburton of Spitchwick Park in the parish of Widdecombe in Devon), to the design of John Nash.

== Descent ==
=== See of Exeter ===
Sandridge is not listed in the Domesday Book of 1086 The earliest recorded reference is to Sanderig in the 13th century Book of Fees, as a member estate of the large manor of Paignton, a possession of the Bishop of Exeter.

=== de Sandridge ===
The earliest recorded occupant of the estate was the de Sandridge family, which as was usual took its surname from its seat. The members of this family which were evidenced by Pole (d.1635) were as follows: Stephan Sandrigge, who during the reign of King Henry II (1154-1189) held it from the Bishop of Exeter as overlord as "3 parts" of a fee; Martin de Sandrigge held it in 1242; William de Sandrigge in 1295; Richard de Sandrigge in 1314. The last recorded member of this family to hold the estate was Henry de Sandrigge in 1345.

=== de Pomeroy ===
Arms of Pomeroy: Or, a lion rampant guardant gules armed and langued azure within a bordure engrailed sable

Following the de Sandridge family was the de Pomeroy family, feudal barons of Berry Pomeroy of Berry Pomeroy Castle in Devon. Pole lists the members of this family which held Sandridge as follows, without dates: Thomas Pomeray, Robert Pomeray, Sir Thomas Pomeray (son of Robert), etc., and named the holder living in his own lifetime as Hanniball Pomeray. However, the Heraldic Visitations of Devon show the holder tempore Pole as Valentine Pomeroy (1575-1645), son and heir of Thomas Pomeroy (1543-1615) "Bingley" or "Bindley" in Devon (Beenleigh, Harberton Ford, in the parish of Harberton.).

It is said that Captain John Davis, the great Elizabethan navigator and explorer, was probably born at Sandridge Barton, the manor farm, in 1543.

Sandridge thereafter became the principal seat of the Pomeroy family, with Beenleigh in Harberton serving as a seat for younger sons. Valentine Pomeroy, son of Thomas Pomeroy & Honor Rolle daughter of Sir John Rolle of Stevenstone born Abt. 1519 in Stevenstone, Devon, died 24 Aug 1570 in Stevenstone, by Margaret Ford Abt. 1544 half sister of John Ford who married Mary Pomeroy daughter of Hugh Pomeroy of Ingsdon Manor and his 1st wife Barbara Southcot dau of John Southcott of Indiho House Bovey Tracey.

Valentine married twice, firstly in about 1615 to Jane Reynell, eldest daughter of Sir Thomas Reynell (1545-1621) of East Ogwell in Devon. Jane's uncle was Sir Richard Reynell (c.1558–1633) of Forde in the parish of Wolborough, MP, who built the surviving Ford House (now in the suburbs of Newton Abbot) and whose daughter and sole heiress Jane Reynell, married the Civil War Parliamentary general Sir William Waller. Valentine Pomeroy's father Sir Thomas Pomeroy (1503-1566), had in 1547 sold the barony of Berry Pomeroy Castle, park and manor to Edward Seymour, 1st Duke of Somerset who gave it to his eldest son from his first marriage, Lord Edward Seymour (1529–1593).

Three daughters and a son were born to Valentine by Jane before she died in about 1622. One daughter, born 161, survived, Jane who married Nicholas Roope of Dartmouth 1643. Valentine secondly in Married Margaret Whiddon by licence 30 April 1628 Exeter (d.1674), a daughter of Sir John Whiddon, by whom he had 4 sons the eldest being Roger Pomeroy (1629-1708), who married Joane Wills (d.1660), daughter of Elias Wills of Saltash. 2nd son Valentine married Lucy Hody, and had 5 children; 3rd son Gilbert inherited Sandridge after his nephew Hugh and 4th son John born about 1636 died in a boating accident on the Dart in 1670 and was buried with his two companions Francis Whidden & Thomas Martyn in the same grave at Stoke Gabriel.

Roger Pomeroy had two sons, the younger dying as an infant, the eldest, Elias Pomeroy (d.1700), became a lawyer admitted to the Middle Temple in 1676, who died without progeny and was buried at Stoke Gabriel. (Roger's daughter and eventual co-heiress Joan Pomeroy (d.1734) married Humphry Gilbert (d.1715) of Compton in the parish of Marldon, Devon.)

Sandridge then descended to Elias's first cousin Hugh Pomeroy (d.1715), eldest son of Elias's uncle Valentine III Pomeroy (1631-1691) of Bindley, 3rd son of Valentine I Pomeroy. Hugh Pomeroy died without male progeny, leaving two daughters as co-heiresses. Eventually Sandridge descended to the Gilbert family.

=== Gilbert ===
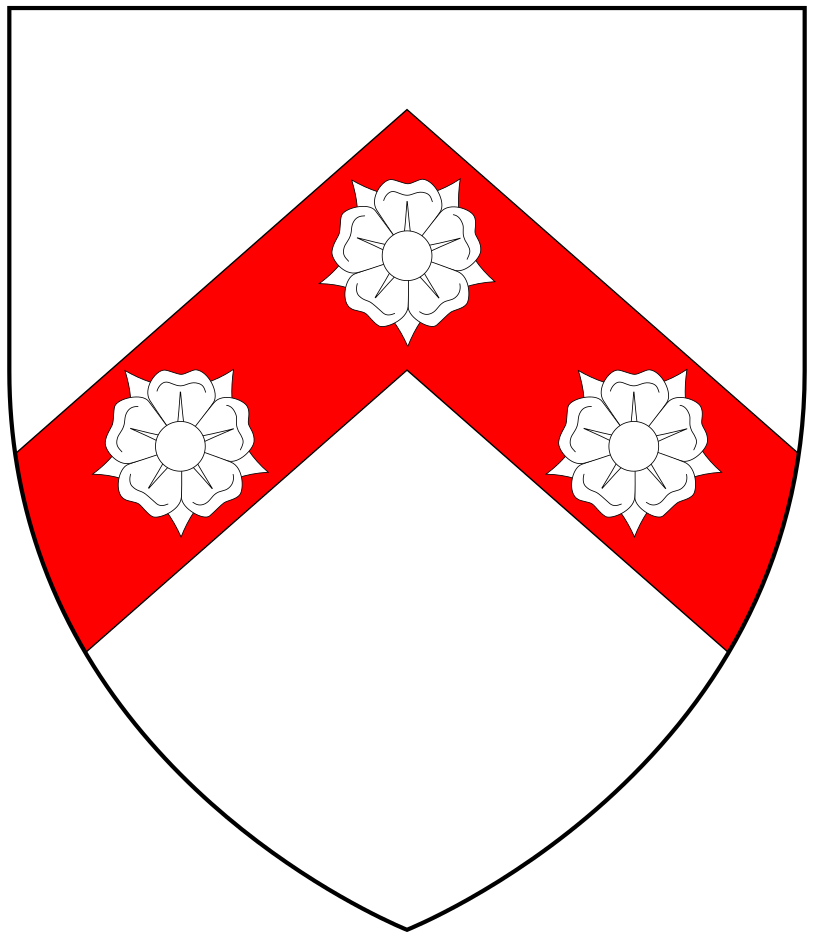
Arms of Gilbert: Argent, on a chevron gules three roses of the field. Crest: A squirrel sejant gules

==== Humphry Gilbert (d.1715) ====
Humphry Gilbert (d.1715) of Compton in the parish of Marldon, Devon, who married Joan Pomeroy (d.1734), a daughter and eventual co-heiress of Roger Pomeroy (1629-1708) of Sandridge. As frequently happened in such cases where a wealthy heiress married into an already wealthy family with an existing seat, Sandridge became the seat of a younger son, in this case of her 3rd son, Raleigh Gilbert (1688-1773), who died unmarried.

- John Gilbert (1684-1733), Humphry Gilbert's eldest son and heir, sold the family's secondary seat, Greenway in the parish of Churston Ferrers, possibly the family's most ancient seat before Geffrey Gilbert (d.1344) inherited Compton on marriage to the heiress Jone de Compton.
- Capt. Pomeroy I Gilbert (d.1770), 74th Regiment, eldest son and heir, baptised at Stoke Gabriel and seated at Sandridge. he married Mary Williams, daughter of Rear-Admiral Edmund Williams of Plymouth. His eldest son Pomeroy II Gilbert (d.1762), died unmarried and was buried at Marldon. Pomeroy I Gilbert's 2nd son was Roger Pomeroy Gilbert (1745-1799), "Captain of Invalides" at Pendennis Castle near Falmouth in Cornwall. In 1775 he sold the family's principal seat of Compton Castle, and died unmarried in 1799. His monument is situated in Bodmin Church in Cornwall.

At some time before 1792 Sandridge was sold by the Gilbert family, as in that year Rev. John Swete (d.1821) recorded in his Travel Journal that he had accompanied Mr Dunning (later Baron Ashburton) on an inspection tour around his new estate at Sandridge. Roger Pomeroy Gilbert's younger brother Lt.Walter Raleigh Gilbert (1752-post 1814), Mayor of Bodmin, Cornwall, was seated at The Priory, Bodmin, and although he died without surviving progeny, the descendants of his next elder brother Rev. Edmund Gilbert, were seated at until after 1937. Rev. Edmund Gilbert's younger son was General Sir Walter Raleigh Gilbert, 1st Baronet (1785-1853) whose 44 metre high obelisk monument survives in Bodmin.

=== Dunning ===
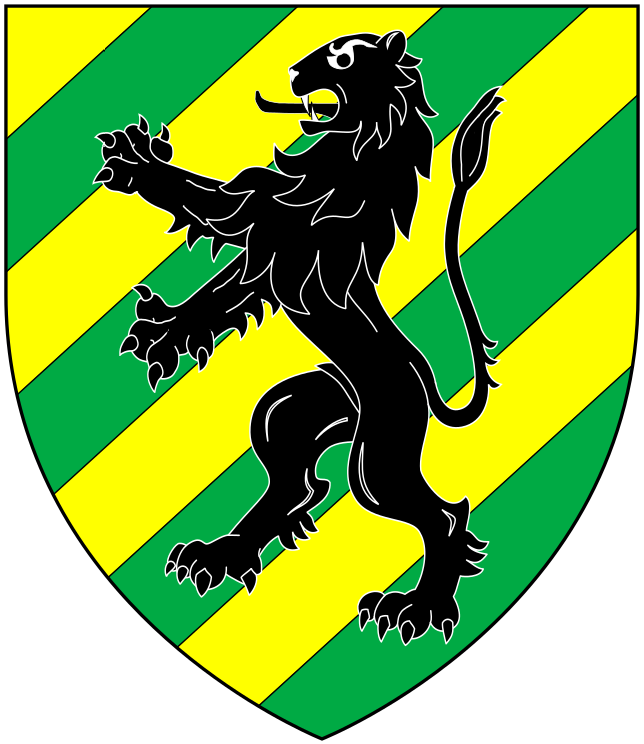
Arms of Dunning, Baron Ashburton: Bendy sinister of eight or and vert, overall a lion rampant sable

Sandridge was purchased by John Dunning (1731–1783), from 1782 1st Baron Ashburton, who was born at Ashburton, Devon, the son of a local attorney of modest yeoman family, and had an eminent career as a lawyer and Member of Parliament, rising to the office of Solicitor General in 1768. As Solicitor-General he acquired the then unprecedented sum of £10,000 per annum and as a money-lender he had obtained estates that brought him in large sums.

But his main acquisition of lands had been to the detriment of the ancient Gould family of Devonshire, which traced its roots back to a certain "John Gold", a crusader present at the Siege of Damietta in (1218–19). Edward Gould (1666-1736) of Pridhamsleigh in the parish of Staverton, Devon, was the last male of the senior branch of the Gould family, and bequeathed all his lands in Staverton, Ashburton, Holne, Widdecombe-on-the-Moor and Chudleigh to his infant distant cousin William Drake Gould (1719-1766) of Lew Trenchard, Devon, the representative of the next branch. The estates of William Drake Gould devolved on his only son Edward Gould (1740-1788), a spendthrift and a gambler. One evening after a game of cards in which he had lost "every guinea he had about him", he rode off, put a black mask over his face as a highwayman, waylaid the winner of the game and shot him dead. That Edward Gould was a very distant relative of Dunning's, and Dunning defended him successfully at his ensuing murder trial in about 1768. (Dunning's great-aunt Margaret Dunning (d.1662), whose monumental brass survives in Staverton Church, married (as his first wife) Edward Gould (1637-1675) of Pridhamsleigh, Staverton, who by his second wife was the father of Edward Gould (1666-1736)). Dunning lent Edward Gould increasingly large sums secured on mortgages, and he eventually foreclosed, securing for himself possession of most of the Gould estates around Ashburton, Widdecombe, Holne, and Staverton. Edward Gould ended his days in lodgings in Shaldon. Dunning then purchased for £4,700 the 88 year residue of a lease of ninety-nine years of the manors of Spitchwick and Widdecombe.

It had been Dunning's original intention to build a grand mansion on his estate of Sandridge, as he informed Rev John Swete to whom he was showing that new purchase, also in the company of Sir Robert Palk, 1st Baronet (1717-1798), who also expanded a large mansion and planted vast expanses of woodland at Haldon House, having also had a change of mind as to location, in his case from Tor Mohun to Haldon. He was at first "struck with the beauty and grandeur of the spot (i.e. of Sandridge) and...then express'd an intention of raising an house on it that should be more worthy than the present of the situation". Although Dunning changed his mind and built at Spitchwick instead, after his death in 1783 his widow in 1805 finally built the envisioned mansion at Sandridge, now surviving as Sandridge Park. As for Lord Ashburton's change of mind, Swete remarked: "He soon dropt all thoughts of proceding with the plans he had form'd at Sandridge; Park indeed was a situation more congenial to Lord Ashburton's mind; it was wild and romantic; he delighted its softening the harsh and rude features of the scene around him and in its meliorating the grounds, which lay almost in a state of nature, neglected and uncultur'd".

Lord Ashburton created at Spitchwick (on the site of a chapel dedicated to St. Laurence) a mansion in which "he much delighted to reside" and where he "escap'd from the trammels of State and the bustle of the Great Town, and enjoy'd the otium cum dignitate. This was his Tusculum and here" (as he often told Swete) "(with) his rural amusements, with his books, his friends, his dearest Leisure...he past his pleasantest hours".

The large manor of Widecombe-in-the-Moor included a farm called "Park", to which shortly after his acquisition he had "added a room or two". This was the origin of the mansion house, later known as "Spitchwick Park", which he subsequently built.

Lord Ashburton also had a seat at Bagtor in the parish of Ilsington, on his Dartmoor estate about 6 miles north-east of Spitchwick.
