= Stoke Gabriel =

Village in Devon, England

Coordinates: 50°24′12.2″N 3°37′16.3″W

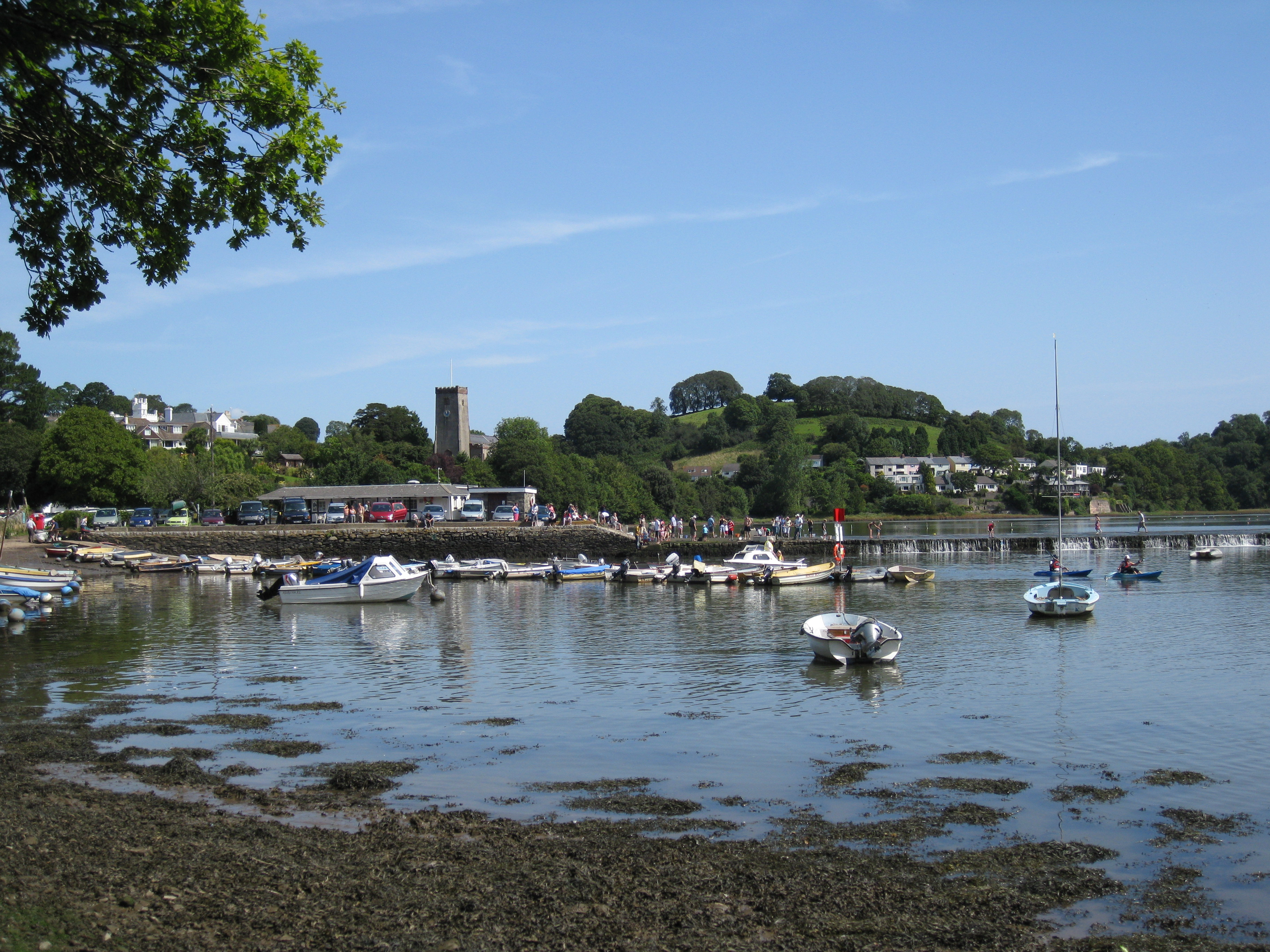
- Stoke Gabriel - the creek beyond the mill pond

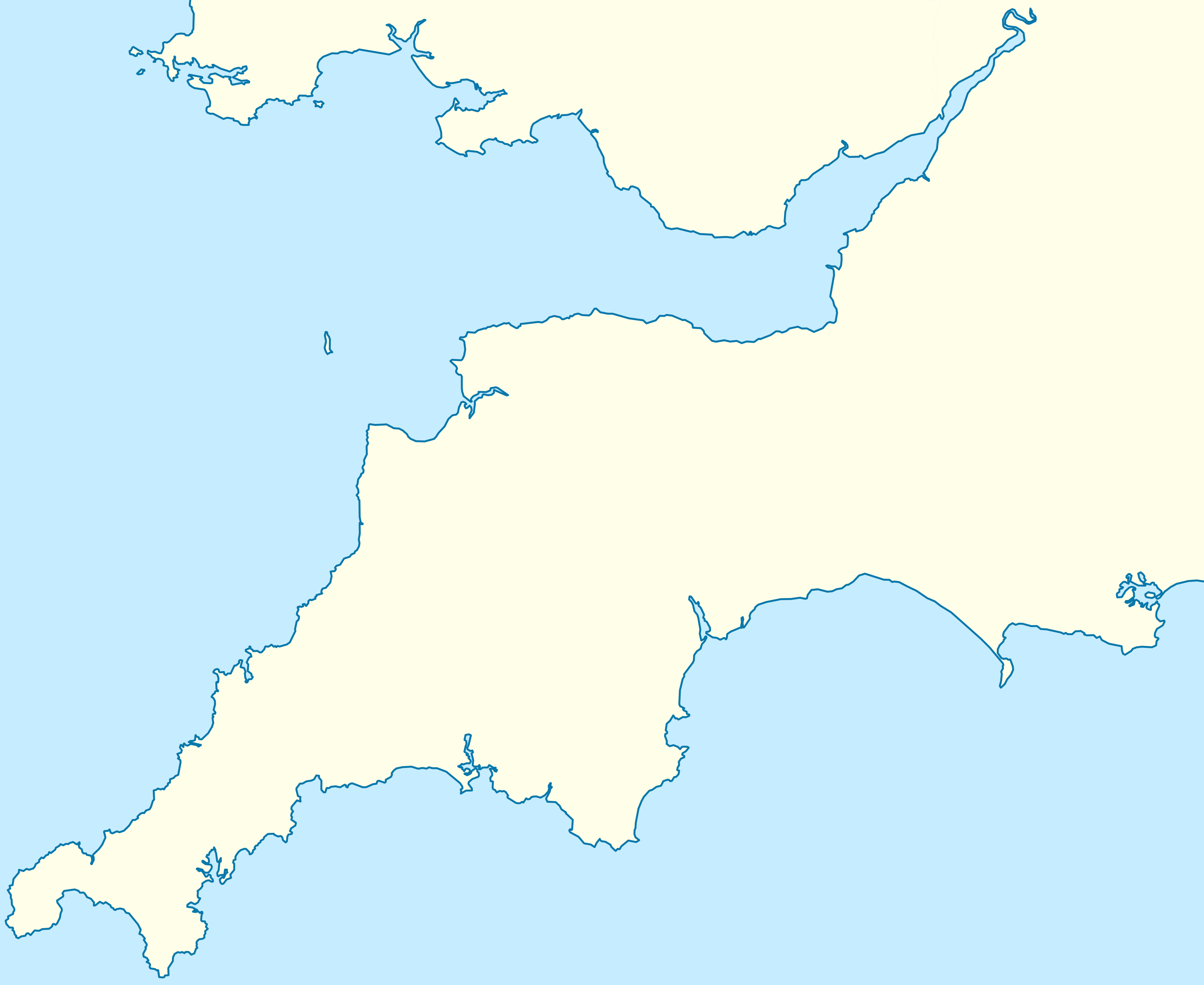
- Location within Devon Stoke Gabriel (Europe) Stoke Gabriel (Devon)
- Population: 1,107
- OS grid reference: SX850572
- District: South Hams
- Shire county: Devon
- Region: South West
- Country: England
- Sovereign state: United Kingdom
- Post town: TOTNES
- Postcode district: TQ9
- Dialling code: 01803
- Police: Devon and Cornwall
- Fire: Devon and Somerset
- Ambulance: South Western
- UK Parliament: Totnes

Stoke Gabriel is a village and parish in Devon, England, situated on a creek of the River Dart. The village is a popular tourist destination in the South Hams and is famous for its mill pond and crab fishing (known colloquially as crabbing). It is equidistant from Paignton, Dartmouth and Totnes, and has a population of approximately 1,200, reducing slightly to 1,107 at the 2011 census. The village is the major part of the electoral ward of East Dart. The ward population at the abovementioned census was 1,877.

Fisherman probably first came to Stoke Gabriel to fish salmon and gain access to the River Dart. The village has an approximately 1,000-year-old yew tree in the churchyard of The Church of St Mary and St Gabriel, a church which has stood since Norman times. Legend has it that if you walk backwards seven times round the yew's main stem you will be granted a wish.

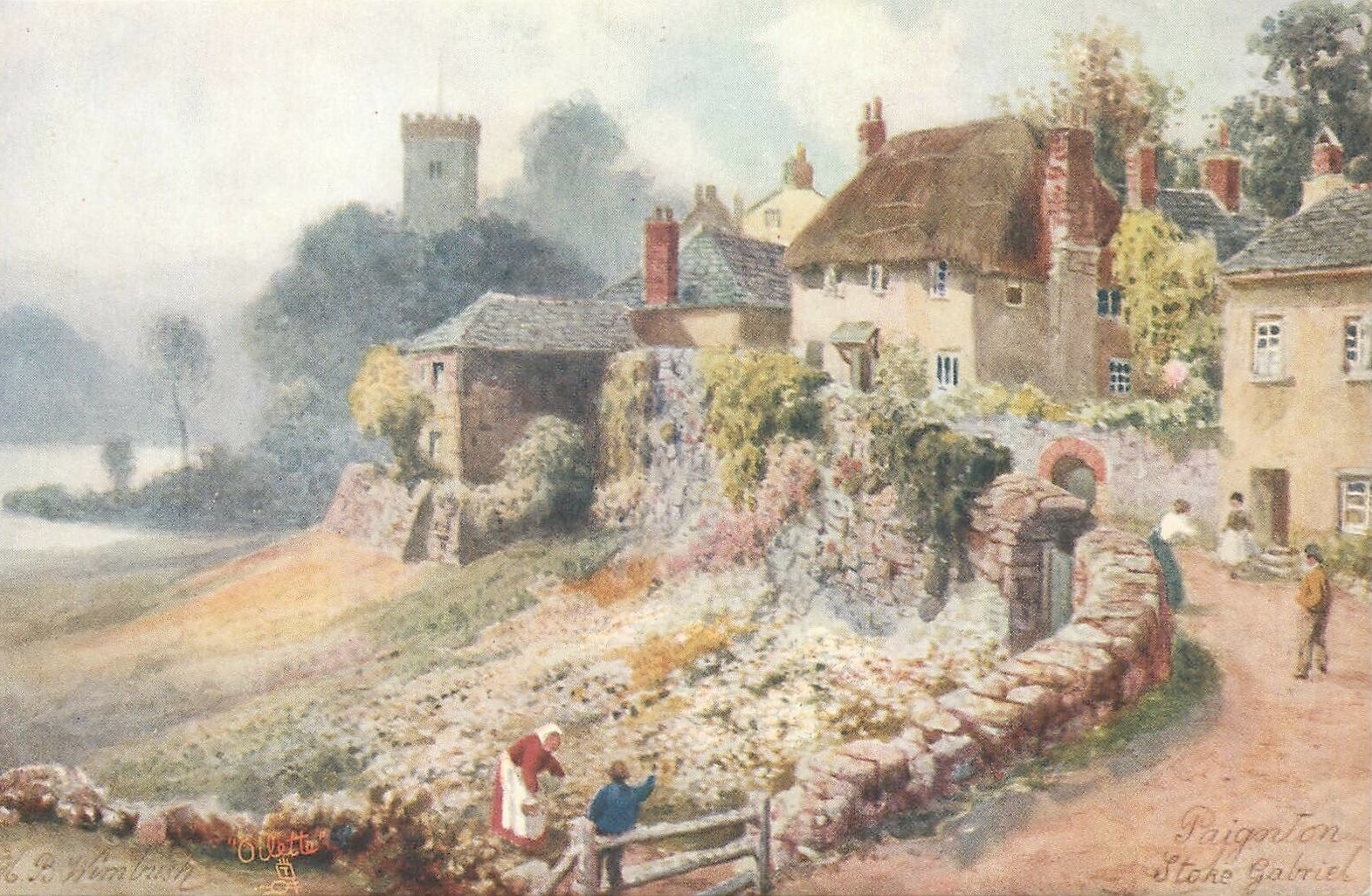
Stoke Gabriel by Henry B. Wimbush, c. 1910

The village has two public houses; The Church House Inn and The Castle Inn. Until relatively recently there were three pubs. The other being The Victoria and Albert Inn. The Church House Inn was built to accommodate the masons who constructed the church and also served as the courthouse. The old stocks can be seen outside the inn today.

Stoke Gabriel is the template for the fictional village of Thornford Regis in C. C. Benison's crime novels Twelve Drummers Drumming and Eleven Pipers Piping.

== Notable people ==
- John Davis (ca.1550 – 1605), one of the chief navigators of Queen Elizabeth I.
- George Jackson Churchward CBE (1857–1933), an English railway engineer and chief mechanical engineer of the Great Western Railway, he lends his name to the local football club's ground - Stoke Gabriel & Torbay Police F.C.
