= Calverleigh =

Village in Devon, England

Coordinates: 50.919°N 3.536°W

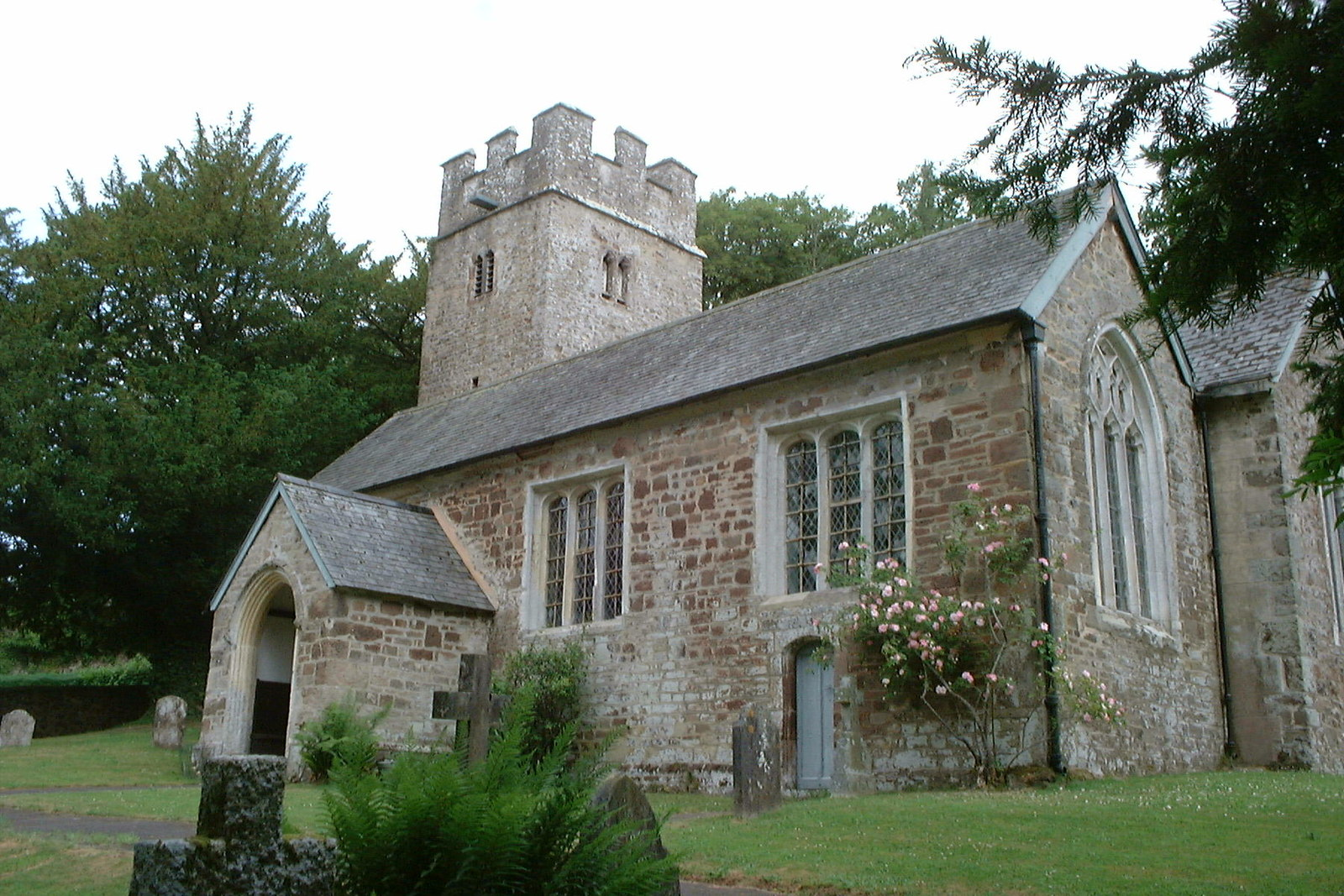
- St Mary the Virgin church, Calverleigh

- Location within Devon
- Civil parish: Loxbeare
- District: Mid Devon
- Shire county: Devon
- Region: South West
- Country: England
- Sovereign state: United Kingdom

Calverleigh (anciently Calwoodleigh) is a village and former civil parish and manor, now in the parish of Loxbeare, in the Mid Devon district, in the county of Devon, England. It is situated 2 miles north-west of Tiverton. The parish church is dedicated to St Mary. The resident lords of the manor were for many generations the Calwoodleigh family. In 1881, the parish had a population of 83. On 25 March 1885, the parish was abolished and merged with Loxbeare.

== Calverleigh Court ==
The manor house called Calverleigh Court is situated to the west of the parish church and was rebuilt in 1844–5 by Joseph Chichester Nagle to the design of George Wightwick (1802–1872) of Plymouth.
