= St Petrock's Church, Exeter =

Church in Devon, England

Coordinates: 50.7227°N 3.5322°W

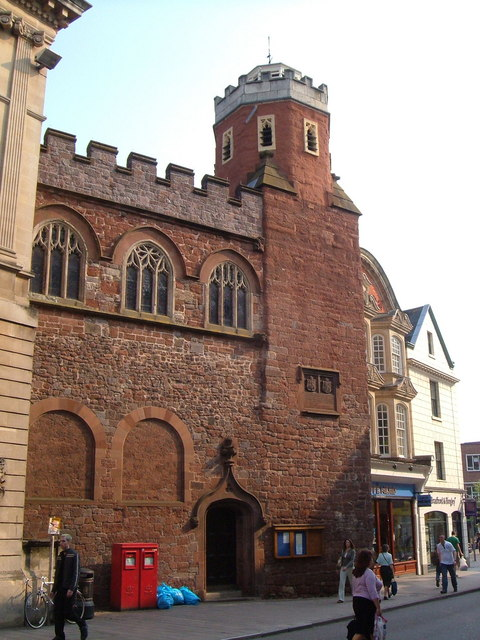
St Petrock's church

St Petrock's Church is a small church in the centre of Exeter with an interior described by Nicholas Pevsner as "among the most confusing of any church... in England". The church may have been founded as early as the 6th century, but other sources date it to the 11th century. William the Conqueror directed the City Provost to pay it one silver penny out of the public taxes, along with 29 other churches. The current building dates originally from early medieval times and is dedicated to St Petrock, who was a 6th-century Roman Catholic Welsh abbot who was later granted the title of saint by the Vatican.
