= Middle Rocombe =

Hamlet in Devon, England

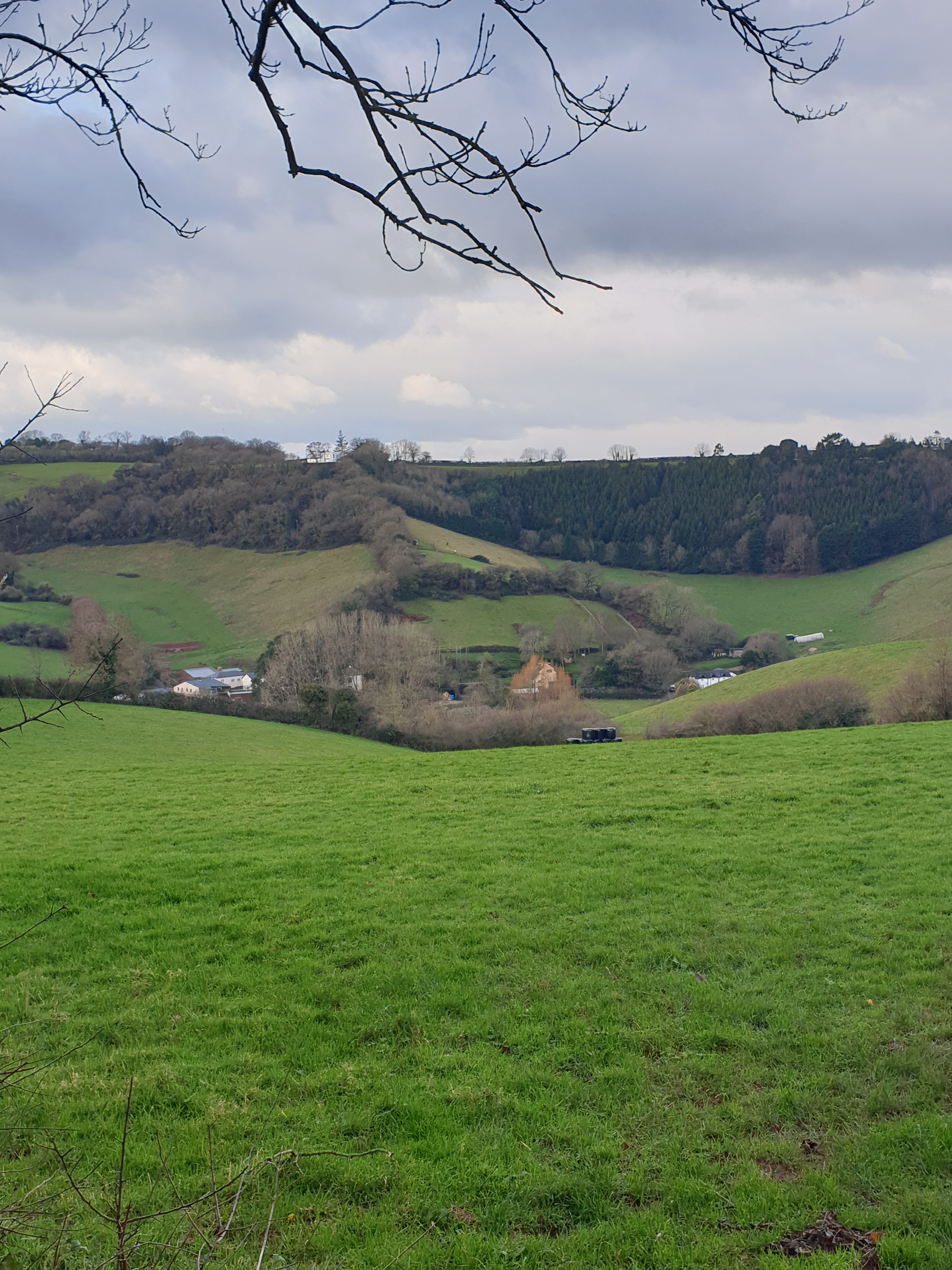

- Location within the United Kingdom
- OS grid reference: SX90916940
- Civil parish: Stokeinteignhead
- Shire county: Devon
- Country: England
- Sovereign state: United Kingdom
- Post town: Newton Abbot
- Dialling code: 01626

Middle Rocombe is a hamlet in Devon, England. It lies just over 1 mile to the southwest of the nearest village, Stokeinteignhead, and is located about 3 miles from Newton Abbot, lying within the Teignbridge district of Devon. It is situated in the Rocombe valley surrounded by the neighbouring hamlets of Higher and Lower Rocombe and is bordered by Coffinswell and Haccombe over the valley. The hamlet consists of a handful of houses, including a traditional, thatched cottage.

== History ==
People have lived in the Rocombe Valley for thousands of years; archaeologist, William Pengelly carried out an excavation and found a saddle quern stone – now in Torquay museum – and in a trench found shells, pottery and skeletons; evidence for a Romano-British settlement.

The first record of Rocombe is in the Domesday Book. Its name derives from racumb: -cumb being the old English for valley and ra referring to Roe-deer hence Rocombe is 'the valley frequented by roe deer'. In the Domesday book, Middle Rocombe is recorded as belonging to William Cheever, who also held almost all of the land in Combeinteignhead, and to Edric before the Norman conquest. The hamlet appears again in fourteenth century sources, recorded as Rocombe Blaumoster held by Reginald de Clifford, as part of the manor of Combeinteignhead and consequently the parish. This distinguishes Middle Rocombe from neighbouring hamlets, which were in the parish of Stokeinteignhead - this difference is illustrated on the tithe map of Combeinteignhead, 1839. It is unclear when the hamlet became part of the civil parish of Stokeinteignhead - as it is now.

== Landscape ==
The landscape consists almost exclusively of hilly farmland. Traditional Devon hedgerows establish field boundaries with older, medieval boundary banks still visible from above as earthwork ditches, having fallen out of use by the mid 19th century. Due to its rural location, Middle Rocombe is frequented by horse-riders, walkers and ramblers, supported by the several green lanes that connect to the hamlet. Furthermore, it is a point and intersection on the John Musgrave Heritage Walking Trail, forming part of section one from Maidencombe to Cockington; its significance is listed as the origin of Rocombe Farm Ice Cream.

The hamlet lies within a separate catchment to Stokeinteignhead, as it drains through Combeinteignhead, via the small stream that runs through it, and eventually out into the River Teign.

== Landmarks ==
Middle Rocombe has a wall post box from the Victorian era; it is embossed with the letters VR which stands for Victoria Regina, after Queen Victoria, indicating it was installed during her reign but after 1887 when adding the VR cipher began. It is still in use and also has the manufacturer embossed on it; W.H Allen & Co London, and is in good condition.

== Rocombe Farm Ice Cream ==
Most notably, Middle Rocombe is the birthplace of Rocombe Farm Ice Cream: the UK's first organic ice cream company. Middle Rocombe farm became the second organic dairy farm in Devon, in 1986, and production of ice cream began a year later with its flagship shop located in Torquay. In 2000, dairy giant Yeo Valley acquired the company, taking over its trademarking and moving production to elsewhere in Devon. More recently, the redundant farm buildings formed the basis of the Art Farm Project showcasing local artwork.

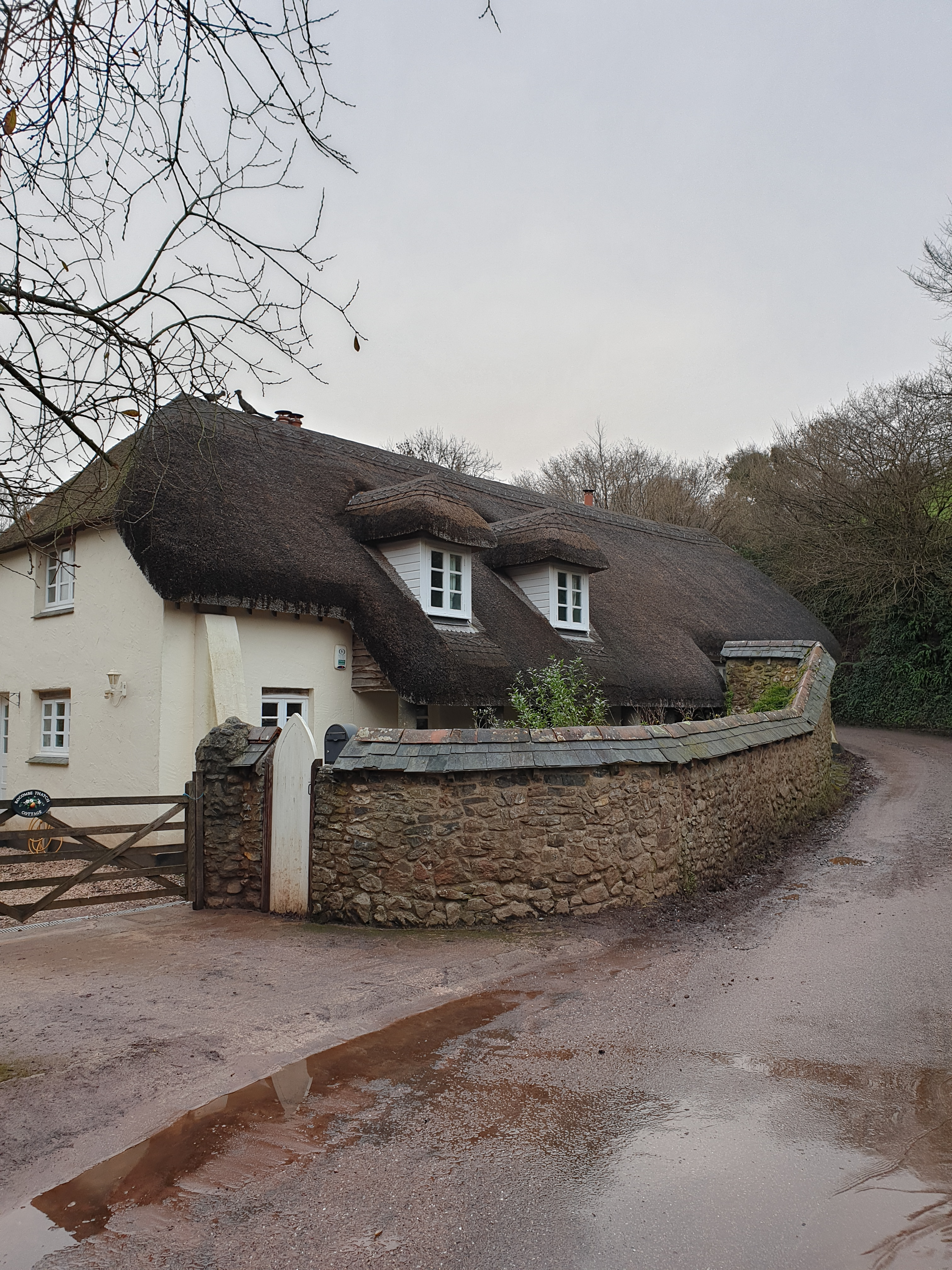
Thatched Cottage, Middle Rocombe
