= Aller Brook =

Stream in Devon, England

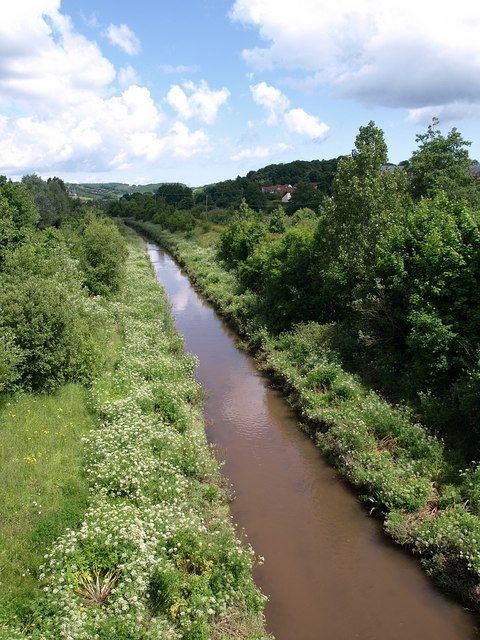
- Aller Brook near Newton Abbot

- Location within Devon

Location
- Country: England
- Counties: Devon

Physical characteristics
- Mouth: River Teign
  - location: Devon
  - coordinates: 50.5342°N 3.5900°W
- Length: 8 km (5.0 mi)

The Aller Brook is a stream that flows for 5.0 miles (8 km) through Devon, England. It is a primary tributary of the River Teign, which it joins near Newton Abbot.

== Etymology ==
The name of the brook is first attested in around 1540, as Aller water; the name Aller brook is first attested in 1577. The name comes from the name of a village, given in the Domesday Book of 1086 as Alre (which in turn comes from the Old English word alor, "alder").

== Course ==
The brook rises to the south of Daccombe, near Coffinswell, and initially flows due west, until it reaches the village of Kingskerswell, where it turns north to flow through the Aller vale. It is joined by a stream on the left which drains Abbotskerswell and Compton. The brook continues north, passing to the west of Milber, before it reaches Newton Abbot. Originally the brook took a meandering course through this marshy area, but in the 1980s it was forced to run alongside the A380 road in a straight channel. The area is now a local nature reserve, situated between the town and the Buckland estate. At the end of the reserve the brook enters the Teign Estuary at the Templer Way footbridge.

The water level of the stream has been measured in Kingskerswell since 2004, normal levels are between 0.29 metres (11 in) and 0.42 metres (1 ft 5 in). The maximum recorded level was 1.42 metres (4 ft 8 in) in November 2012.

== Ecology ==
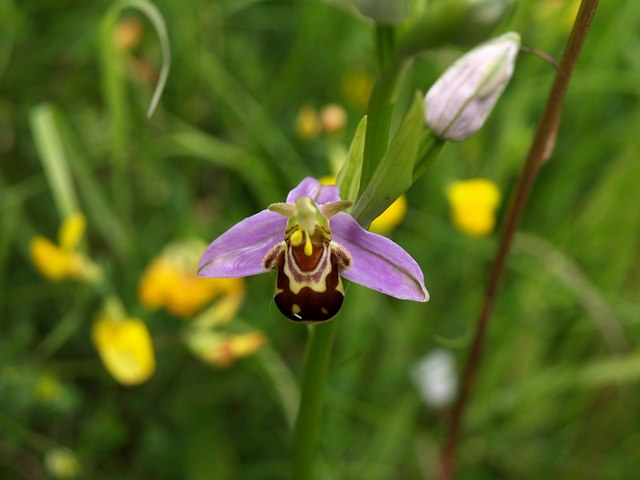
Bee orchid, Aller Brook Local Nature Reserve

The brook has been classed as having both good ecological and chemical quality under the Water Framework Directive. This is in the upper band in the five-part framework scale, which ranges from high, good, and moderate, through to poor and finally bad.

Wildlife including dragonflies, kingfishers and otters have been identified within the nature reserve. There is also a notable cluster of Bee Orchids (Ophrys apifera) within the reserve.

The recent construction of the Kingskerswell bypass along the Aller valley, required various environmental measures to be included due to the local wildlife. This included the construction of a specially designed tunnel for otters, which will help them navigate beneath the new carriageway when their normal routes, such as culverts are flooded and inaccessible due to high brook levels.
