= Kingskerswell =

Village in Devon, England

Coordinates: 50.4960°N 3.5722°W

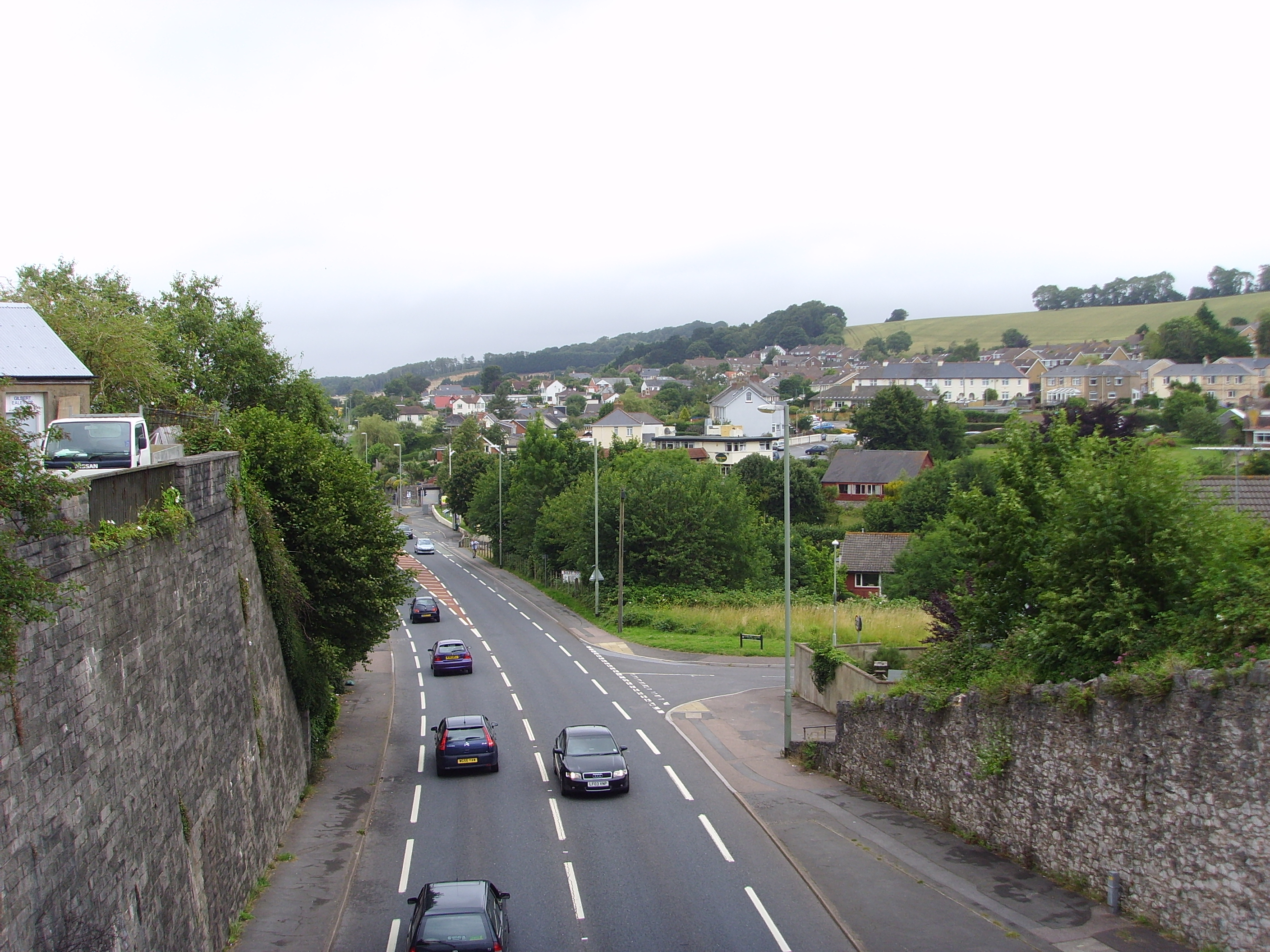
- The former A380 road through Kingskerswell, 2008

- Location within Devon
- OS grid reference: SX8867
- District: Teignbridge
- Shire county: Devon
- Region: South West
- Country: England
- Sovereign state: United Kingdom
- Post town: Newton Abbot
- Postcode district: TQ12
- Dialling code: 01803
- Police: Devon and Cornwall
- Fire: Devon and Somerset
- Ambulance: South Western
- UK Parliament: Newton Abbot

Kingskerswell (formerly Kings Carswell, or Kings Kerswell) is a village and civil parish within the Teignbridge local government district in the south of Devon, England. The village grew up where an ancient track took the narrowest point across a marshy valley, and it is of ancient foundation, being mentioned in the Domesday Book. It has a church dating back to the 14th century and the ruins of a manor house of a similar date. The coming of the railway in the 1840s had a large effect on the village, starting its conversion into a commuter town. The village is a major part of the electoral ward called Kerswell-with-Combe. This ward had a population of 5,679 at the 2011 census.

It was situated on a busy main road, part of the A380, between Torquay and Newton Abbot until the opening of the South Devon Highway in December 2015. There had been proposals to reroute this road to relieve the traffic bottleneck since 1951.

== History ==
=== Beginnings ===
There are several prehistoric sites on the high ground surrounding Kingskerswell, such as the Iron Age sites of Milber Down, Berry's Wood and Dainton. Kerswell Down, just to the west of the village, is the site of a late Bronze Age/early Iron Age field system, and a hoard of over 2,000 (small copper or brass) Roman coins was found here, near the church, some time between 1838 and 1840. The exact details of how and where the coins were found is not known, and their present whereabouts is unknown too, but in 1878 they were said to bear inscriptions of Gallienus, Tacitus, Probus and others. In 1992 during survey work for a bypass, evidence of a Roman settlement was found at Aller Cross, just north of the village. It may have an early military origin, and if it does, it "would be of regional importance".

The Aller Brook and its tributaries lie in a shallow, wide, and marshy valley that drains roughly north-westerly from the outskirts of Torquay to the estuary of the River Teign at Newton Abbot. There is one point in this valley where two spurs of land form a narrow crossing point, and it was here that an ancient track from St Marychurch and Coffinswell crossed the valley on its way west towards Ipplepen and Totnes. A bridge, known as Dacca Bridge or Daccabridge, was constructed here, and this is where the village developed, on the western bank.

The first written record of Kingskerswell is in the Domesday Book where it is called Carsewelle. Before the Norman Conquest it was held by Edward the Confessor as part of the royal demesne; afterwards, it continued in royal ownership under William the Conqueror and his descendants (in contrast to the nearby village of Abbotskerswell). The first part of the village's name represents this royal ownership. The Saxon word carse probably means watercress, a plant that still grows freely in the local streams; and the last part of the name most likely refers to the wells and springs in the vicinity, though an alternative theory proposes that it derives from the Latin villa, indicating a Roman origin.

After being granted to several lords, but always escheating to the king due to the lack of any heirs, the manor was given to Nicholas de Moels in 1230. In 1268 his son, Roger de Molis, was granted the right to hold a weekly market on Tuesdays and an annual fair on 1 September. The manor remained in the de Molis family until some time between 1349 and 1362 when it passed to the Courtenays for a short time until 1369 when it again escheated to the king because the next heir, John Dinham (1359–1428), was aged only eleven.

Armorials of Sir John Dinham: Gules, four lozenges in-fess ermine

John Dinham (or "Dynham") eventually gained his inheritance in 1381. He died in 1428 but the manor remained in his family until 1501. On the death of John Dynham, 1st Baron Dynham in that year, his lands were divided between his four sisters, and the portion that included Kingskerswell passed to his eldest sister, Margery, and eventually to Henry Compton, 1st Baron Compton. By 1710 the manor was owned by Sir Henry Langford, who passed it to Thomas Brown; in 1972 the lord of the manor was T.H. Langford Brown of Littlehempston.

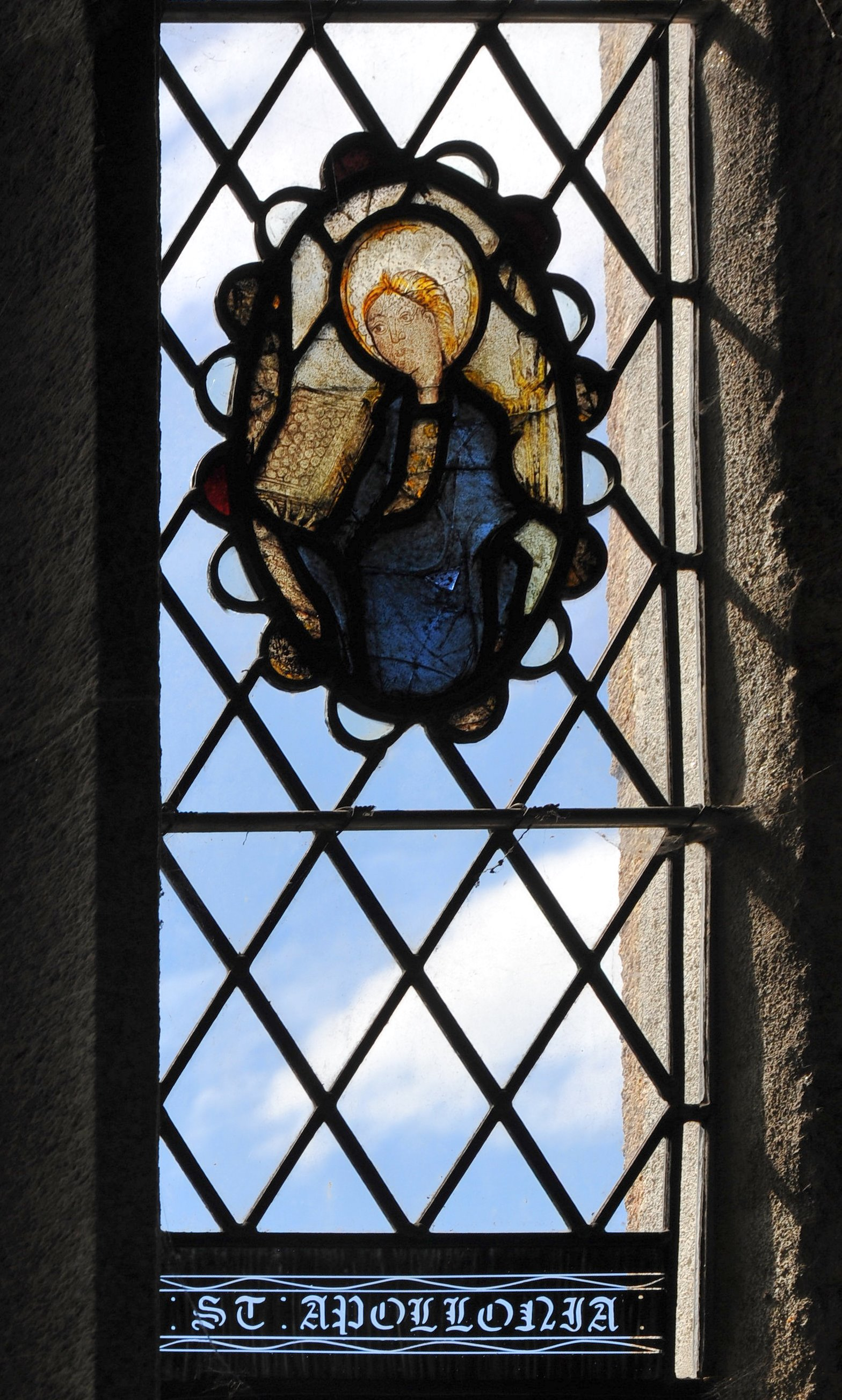
Stained glass image of Saint Apollonia in St Mary's Church

=== The church and manor house ===
A church is mentioned in the Domesday entry for Kingskerswell: "Also to the church of this manor belongs half a virgate of land", though this does not necessarily imply the existence of a building; it may just represent a group of Christians under some form of rectorship or similar administration. By 1159 there was a chaplain named William here, and in 1301 the chapel was visited by the Dean and Chapter of Exeter. They made several notes on the condition of the chapel, including the fact that it had three bells, but it was generally in poor repair—for instance the chancel roof was in a bad condition, and its windows had no glass.

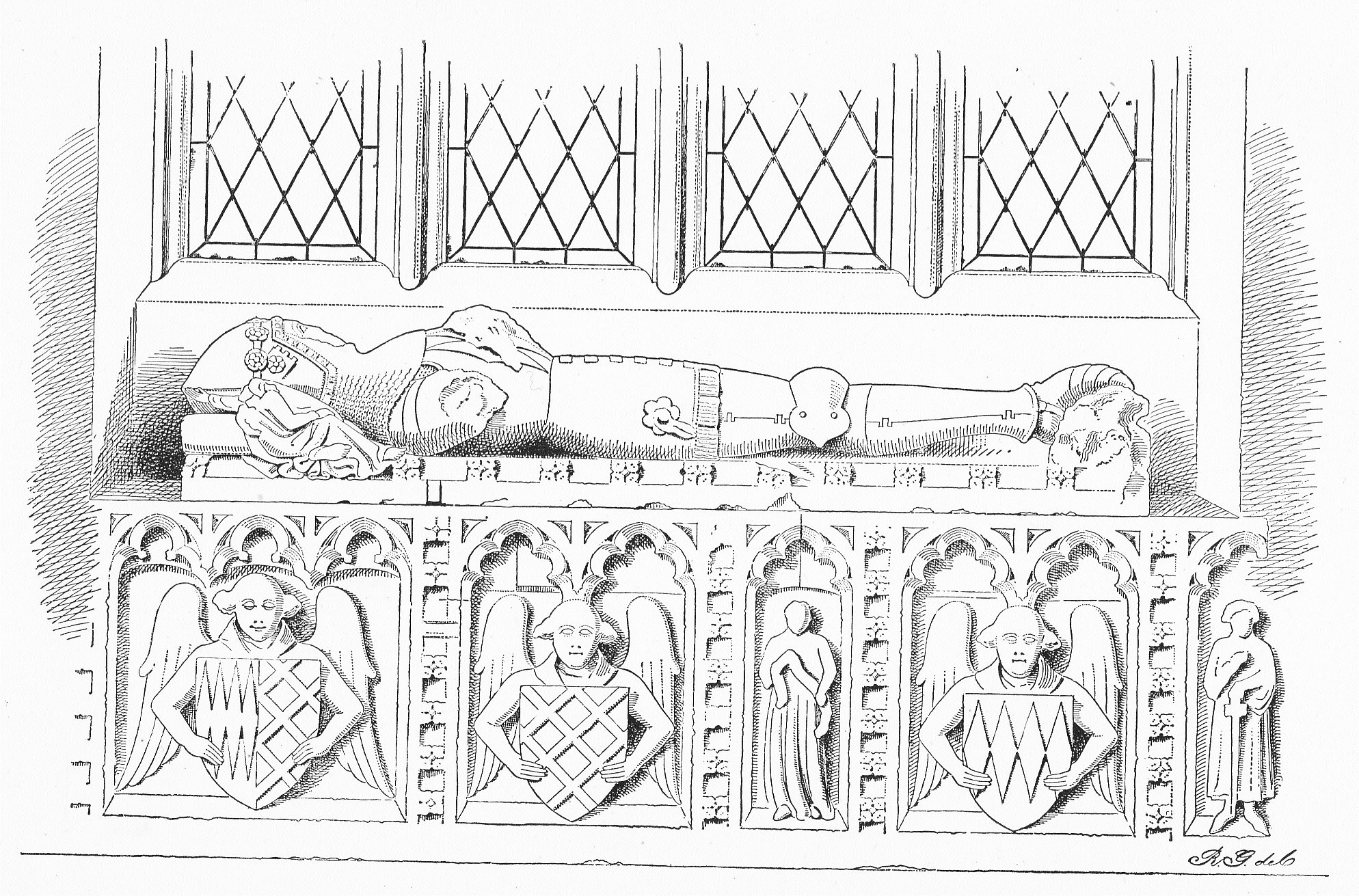
Effigy of Sir John Dinham (1359–1428), St Mary's Church, north aisle. Two female effigies also survive separately, believed to represent two of his three wives. Rogers (1890) suggests one of the ladies to be his 2nd wife Maud Maltravers from the heraldic evidence on Dinham's chest tomb, the arms of her father Sir John Maltravers of Hook, Dorset, being Sable, a fret or. Under the effigy the Dinham arms are impaled with arms of fretty

The church, which is dedicated to St. Mary, may have parts dating to the 14th century, most notably the tower. It remained a chapel under the administration of the parish of St Marychurch until the 1530s when the present building was started. It was extended in the 15th century by converting the transepts into aisles. It was restored c.1856 by John West Hugall and again in 1875 by J. W. Rowell. The church is grade II* listed, and has an uncommon image of Saint Apollonia, the patron saint of toothache sufferers, in the form of ancient stained glass in one of the south windows. It also contains three poorly preserved effigies of the Dinhams who held the manor in the 14th and 15th centuries. They probably represent Sir John Dinham (1359–1428) and two of his three wives.

Just to the north-west of the church are the ruins of a manor house, probably built by the same Sir John Dinham—a document of 1387 confirms that he had a manor house and chapel here in that year. It is not known when the manor house fell into disrepair, but a mention in a lease suggests that it was probably still in good condition in 1681. The ruins were listed (as grade II) in 1955 and were for many years obscured by trees and vegetation. There are several walls, the base of a tower with features in dressed granite and part of an arch. Since 2000 some clearance and conservation work has been undertaken at the site with the assistance of the South West England Environmental Trust, and it is now a scheduled monument.

=== Since 1800 ===
Kingskerswell was made an independent parish, separated for the first time from St. Marychurch, in 1828 and the first incumbent was Aaron Neck (born 1769). In his later life he was very generous to the parish, helping to provide new pews, an organ, and an altarpiece for the church and increasing its glebe-lands, as well as building and supporting a school for 60 children. He also built himself a new vicarage in 1836.

In the 1830s lord of the manor Henry Langford Brown built Barton Hall on a site about 1.5 miles (2.4 km) south east of the church, now on the borders of Torquay. Barton Hall was requisitioned during World War II and left afterwards in a poor state. It was sold to a group of businessmen in 1947 and ten years later sold on to Fred Pontin who turned it into one of the flagships of Pontin's, his holiday empire. The hall and surrounding lands then passed through several owners and, as of 2010, are being run by PGL Travel Ltd. as a centre for schools and youth activity courses, English as a Foreign Language groups, and Family Adventure breaks.

The arrival of the Newton Abbot to Kingswear railway line in the late 1840s had a dramatic effect as it was driven through the centre of the village. It caused extensive changes to the original road layout, including severing the ancient route over Daccabridge, as well as the demolition of several properties and disturbance to the natural drainage pattern of the local springs and streams. Between 1853 and 1964 the village had its own railway station on this line. The Rosehill Viaduct, consisting of seven brick arches on limestone piers over the railway, was built by Brunel in 1846–8 as was the nearby similar Dobbin Arch. They are both now grade II listed structures, and are just two of the 41 listed buildings in the village. The coming of the railway also caused the replacement of much of the local straw thatch that had traditionally been used for roofing with Welsh slate that could be transported at little cost. It also prompted wealthy businessmen from the neighbouring towns of Torquay and Newton Abbot to build many large villas here, making it an early example of a commuter town.

We would point out to parents and children that the school will commence at 1.30 instead of 2.00 for the next few months, so that there will be ample time for blackberry picking after school hours.

— Kingskerswell Parish Magazine,
after the opening of a new infants' school in September 1894.

The Aller Vale Pottery was set up on the north side of the village in 1865, originally producing earthenware goods. It started producing art pottery in 1881 and continued (in name at least) until 1962. In 1886 the pottery was visited by Princess Louise, daughter of Queen Victoria, after she had bought some of its wares. This was the start of a long period of patronage and led to the pottery being renamed as the Royal Aller Vale Pottery. Other members of the Royal family also became customers, including Princess Alexandra. At the end of the 19th century Aller Vale Art Pottery was stocked by Liberty & Co in London.

In the 19th century the village was well known for the production of cider, and much of the land to the east of the main road now occupied by housing estates was once covered by apple orchards. In a commercial directory of 1870 Richard Codner is shown as a cider merchant.

From the 1930s to the 1960s there was greyhound racing at a track opposite the Hare and Hounds pub.

== Today ==
In the 2001 census the population of Kingskerswell was 4799. The village has a health centre, a variety of small shops including a chemist, a village garage, hairdressers and a co-op; and a library which survived a threat of closure in 2006. The village post office closed for the first time in July 2019, but successful efforts to reinstate it resulted in a service resuming in September 2022 from the original post office premises on Fore Street. This service was short-lived however, closing again by August 2024 due to a lack of income.

There is also a modern primary school, a number of pre-school playgroups and a Scout group with their headquarters on Dobbin Arch In 2014 Navigators USA opened their first alternative scouting group in Kingskerswell. Since 1989, Kingskerswell has been twinned with the German town of Lonsee.

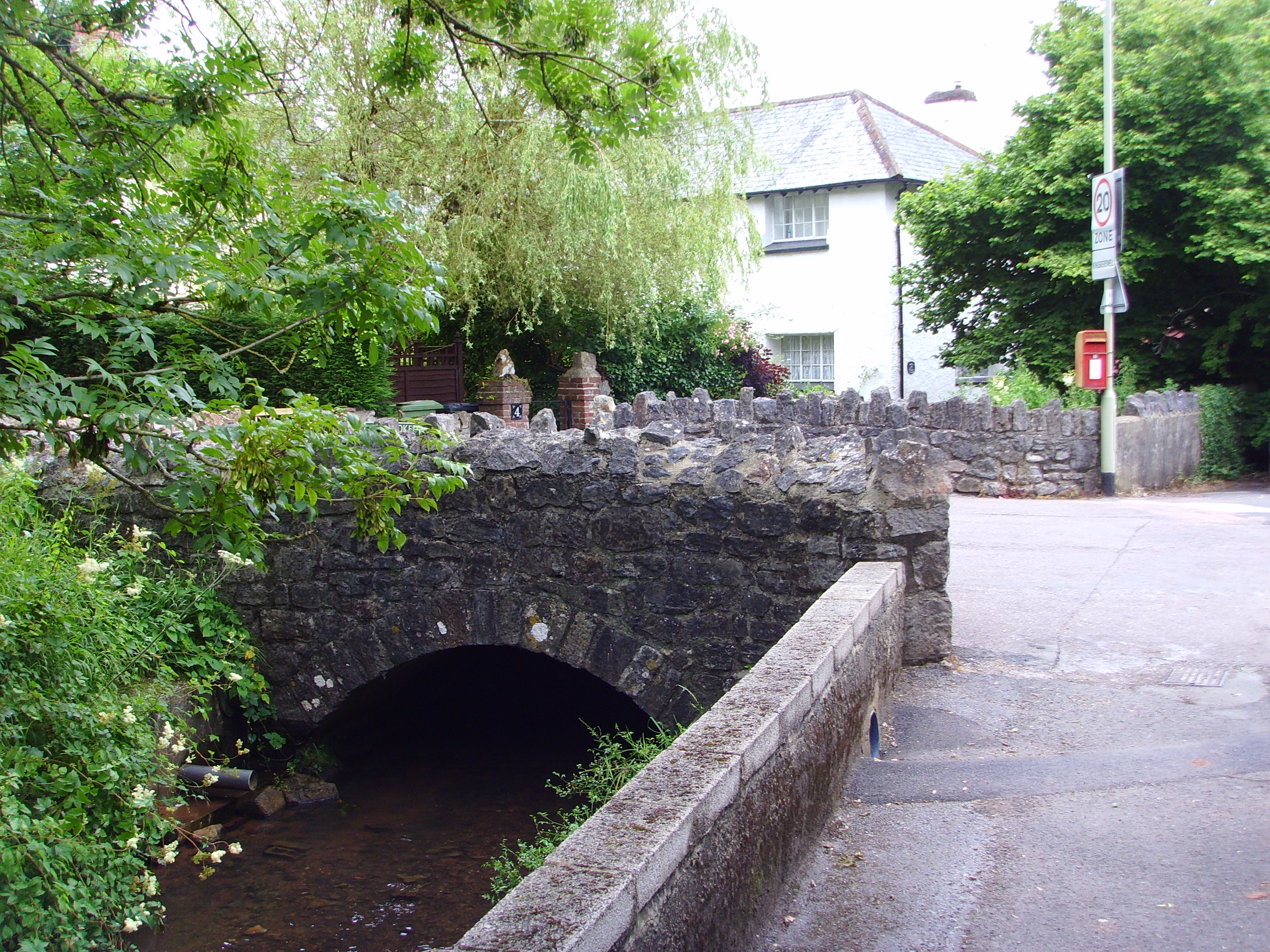
A bridge in the old part of Kingskerswell

There are six churches in the village: Anglican, Catholic, Community, Gospel Hall, Methodist and United Reformed.

From various points in the village there are views towards Dartmoor National Park. To the west is the woodland of Kerswell Downs, the eastern half of which (some 30 acres (120,000 m^{2}) of woodland and grassland) was gifted to the parish by Thomas Hercules Langford Brown, descendant of Henry Langford Brown, who built Barton Hall, for the Millennium year 2000; beyond this is the large limestone quarry at Stoneycombe, and north of that lies the village of Abbotskerswell. On the east are walking trails to the neighbouring village of Coffinswell. There are also country walks from here towards the estuary of the River Teign and Maidencombe on the coast.

The local council (Teignbridge) considers that parts of the village have great character and may have archaeological interest. Consequently, it has designated a conservation area of 3.5 hectares around the ruins of the manor house on the west side of the valley within which further development must be severely restricted.

== The Kingskerswell Bypass ==
The A380 road from Newton Abbot to Torquay was formerly a turnpike road. Since 1951 Devon County Council had planned to alleviate traffic on this road that runs through the village. After being postponed, cancelled and reinstated in the following years, planning permission for a bypass was granted in August 2005 with the main construction work due to start in Summer 2010 for completion in 2013. However, in June 2010 the Government's Transport Minister, Norman Baker said that in light of a tough spending review funding could not be guaranteed, and in October 2010 it was confirmed that the bypass was not one of the 24 schemes that had been approved. However, in November 2011 the government awarded £74.6 million towards the cost of the bypass, and the county council stated that it hoped that construction could start in October 2012 with completion in December 2015. The bypass was opened to traffic on 15 December.

== Notable people ==
- Samuel Barter, a member of the Wisconsin State Assembly.
- Nicholas de Moels held the manor from 1230.
- Samuel Codner, baptised here in 1776, and part of a local family with long-standing links to the Newfoundland cod-fishing industry, set up the Newfoundland School Society in 1823.
- Edward Steere, who became the Bishop of Nyasaland in 1874, had his first curacy at St Mary's church. He married Mary Beatrice Brown of Barton Hall in 1858.
- Mike Sangster, one of the leading British tennis players of the 1960s, was born here in 1940.

== See also ==
A380 road

== Sources ==
- Carsewella Local History Group (2003). The Book of Kingskerswell. Tiverton: Halsgrove. ISBN 1-84114-236-0.
- Walker, Hilda H. (1972), "Presidential Address 1972—The History of Kingskerswell, a Medieval Market Town", Proceedings of the Devon Archaeological Society, 30: 195–215
- "Teignbridge District Conservation Area Character Appraisals—Kingskerswell". Planning Department, Teignbridge District Council. c. 2004. (pdf file)
