= Aller Vale Pottery =

Ceramics manufacturer in Devon, England

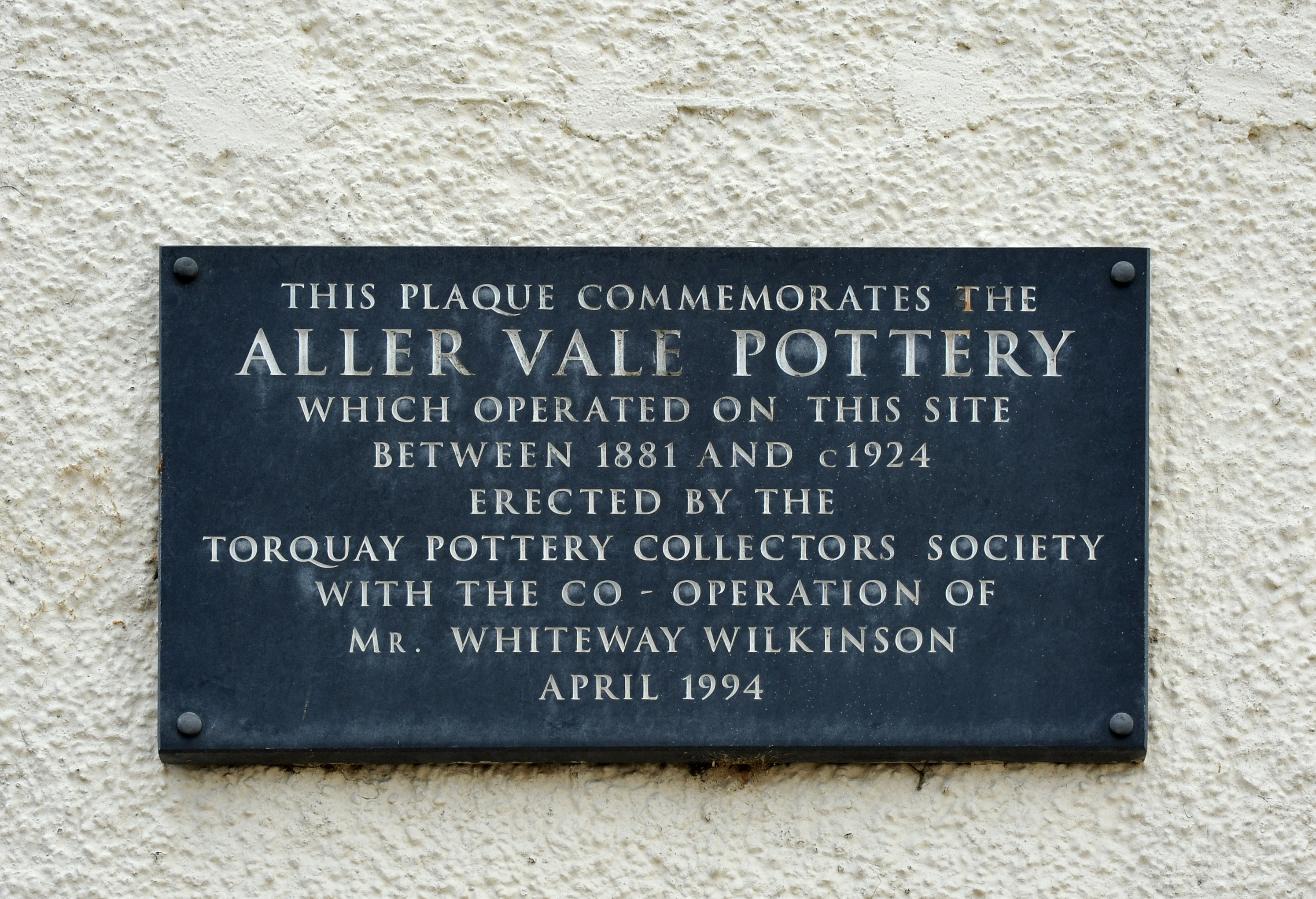
- Wall plaque marking the location of the pottery
- Operated: 1865-1924
- Coordinates: 50°30′29.25″N 3°34′58.81″W
- Products: Pottery
- Address: Aller Vale Buildings, Kingskerswell, Devon, England

The Aller Vale Pottery was formed in 1865 on the northern edge of the village of Kingskerswell in South Devon, England, on the likely site of a medieval pottery. It became well known for the creation of art pottery at the end of the 19th century and gained royal patronage, but declined thereafter, closing on this site in about 1924. The name continued in use until 1962 related to the production of mass-produced motto ware for the tourist market.

== History ==
There had probably been a pottery on the site in medieval times, as evidenced by the excavation of medieval tiles there. The pottery was founded in 1865 in the hamlet of Aller between the village of Kingskerswell and the town of Newton Abbot and had originally produced simple kitchenware. In 1868 it was taken over by John Phillips (born 1835 in Shaugh Prior), a clay merchant who lived in Newton Abbot. Phillips changed the focus of the company to make builders' earthenware—drainpipes, roof tiles, chimney pots and the like. The company was listed in an 1870 directory as "Phillips, John & Co., manufacturers of architectural pottery and firebricks".

Phillips was influenced by the Arts and Crafts Movement and the ideals of William Morris, leading him to set up cottage classes in Kingskerswell and the nearby villages of Abbotskerswell and Coffinswell to teach useful skills to the uneducated young. Up to 64 young people between the ages of 11 and 23 attended these twice-weekly classes where they learned pottery, wood and stone carving, painting, stitching, embroidery, and ironwork which was taught by the local blacksmith.

=== Art pottery ===
Under Phillips's control the works started producing art pottery in 1881 after it was rebuilt following a fire. At this time it was renamed as the Aller Vale Art Pottery. In 1886 the pottery was visited by Princess Louise, daughter of Queen Victoria, after she had bought some of its wares. This was the start of a long period of patronage and led to the pottery being renamed as the Royal Aller Vale Pottery. Other members of the royal family also became customers, including Princess Alexandra. Between 1887 and 1901 Aller Vale Art Pottery was stocked by Liberty & Co in London.

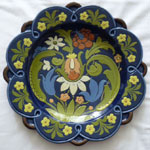
12" Plaque decorated in Art Nouveau style with a seed-head, tendrils and flowers

The decoration of pottery has given regular employment to a number of young villagers, and the wood carving has brought an order from the Princess Louise for a carved chest… Visitors to our Cottage Art School have been greatly entertained and interested by the bright and merry group of young people who greeted their entrance.

— John Phillips Address to The Devonshire Association, Tavistock 1889.

In autumn 1889 the 27-year-old Domenico Marcucci came to Aller Vale as one of the chief designers. He was an Italian decorator from Faenza, a city noted for its faience pottery. Marcucci had been involved in two exhibitions in London during the previous year: an Italian exhibition in Kensington, and one of ceramics at William De Morgan's premises. His influence had a great impact on the designs and the quality of Aller Vale's pottery. Marcucci is thought to be responsible for the introduction of a design of blue slipware scrolls over a cream ground which was admired by Princess Alexandra, who placed a special order for it. She asked that the design should be called Sandringham Ware and it was marketed under that name.

Charles Collard worked as an apprentice to Phillips from the age of 12 in 1886 and, under Marcucci's influence, rose to be one of the top decorators at the pottery by the mid-1890s. His designs were also strongly influenced by İznik pottery.

=== Decline ===
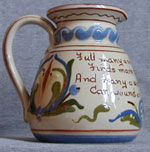
6" Jug decorated with the scandy pattern and a motto

Phillips' death in 1897 led to a decline at the pottery. Many of the potters left shortly afterwards, including Collard who worked briefly for Hart and Moist Pottery in Exeter, then at Longpark Pottery in Torquay, and then founded the Crown Dorset Art Pottery in Poole, Dorset in 1905. He later bought the Honiton Pottery which continued in production until the 1990s.

On Phillips's death, Aller Vale was acquired by Hexter, Humpherson & Co., a Kingsteignton-based company that manufactured tiles and sanitary fittings. In 1901 they also acquired the Watcombe Pottery in Torquay and amalgamated the two companies as the "Royal Aller Vale & Watcombe Pottery Company". This company, with its name sometimes simplified to "Royal Watcombe" continued working until 1962, mostly creating motto ware for the tourist market.

Work at the Aller Vale Pottery site ceased in about 1924, and the site is now occupied by a small estate of offices and light business units, surrounded by houses.

== Sources ==
- Lloyd Thomas, D & E (1978). The Old Torquay Potteries. From Castle to Cottage. Ilfracombe, Devon: Arthur H. Stockwell Ltd. ISBN 0-7223-1103-6.
- Keith Poole, ed. (1996). The Art of the Torquay and South Devon Potters. Torquay: The Torquay Pottery Collectors' Society. ISBN 0-9515089-4-6.
