= Haccombe with Combe =

Civil parish in Devon, England

Coordinates: 50°32′N 3°33′W

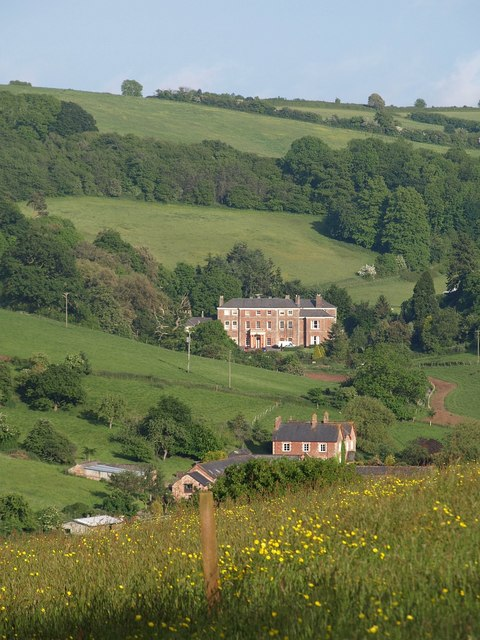
- Haccombe House
- Population: 729 (2001 Census)
- OS grid reference: SX902716
- District: Teignbridge
- Shire county: Devon
- Region: South West
- Country: England
- Sovereign state: United Kingdom
- Post town: Newton Abbot
- Postcode district: TQ12
- Dialling code: 01626
- Police: Devon and Cornwall
- Fire: Devon and Somerset
- Ambulance: South Western
- UK Parliament: Teignbridge

Haccombe with Combe is a civil parish in the Teignbridge local government district of Devon, England. The parish lies immediately to the east of the town of Newton Abbot, and south of the estuary of the River Teign. Across the estuary are the parishes of Kingsteignton and Bishopsteignton. The parish is bordered on the east by Stokeinteignhead and on the south by Coffinswell. Most of the southern boundary of the parish follows the minor ridge road that runs between the suburbs of Milber in Newton Abbot and Barton in Torquay and it bisects the Iron Age hill fort of Milber Down.

In 2001 the population of the parish was 729, much increased from 415 in 1901. The main settlement is the village of Combeinteignhead, with its parish church and public house, the Wild Goose Inn. The other village is Netherton, which probably has origins in a 12th-century estate.

Other notable buildings are Haccombe House and its adjacent church dedicated to Saint Blaise; Buckland Barton (formerly Buckland Baron), which is now a farmhouse with wood panelling and plaster ceilings dating from around 1600, but was a manor at the time of Domesday – it was the home of the Hockmore family to whom there are monuments in the church. On a small promontory in the estuary, Coombe Cellars is now a public house, but was formerly a base for the local fishing industry and a site for smuggling.
