= Coffinswell =

Village in Devon, England

Coordinates: 50°30′N 3°34′W

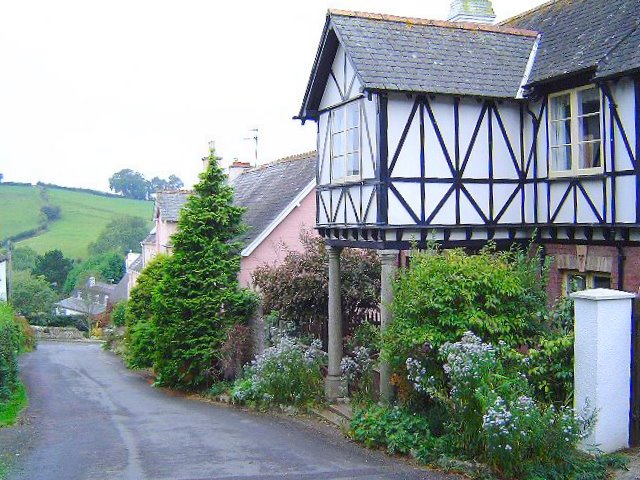
A typical view of the village of Coffinswell

Coffinswell is a small village in South Devon, England, just off the A380, the busy Newton Abbot to Torquay road. It lies within Teignbridge District Council.

Coffinswell has a church dedicated to Saint Bartholomew with a Norman font. Near the church is Court Barton, a manor house of partly 16th century date; the southern part of which was used as a court house by Torre Abbey. The village lies in a rural valley surrounded by farmland, and has many traditional Devon cob and thatch cottages. Lanes and tracks lead to the neighbouring hamlet of Daccombe and over the ridge towards Haccombe and the River Teign approximately 3 miles north over undulating land.

== Surrounding places ==
Coffinswell is surrounded by several small villages and hamlets. Clockwise from the north-west these are:

- Milber. This suburb of Newton Abbot is mainly residential. On the hill above it is the Iron Age hill fort of Milber Down.
- Netherton. A small hamlet between Milber and Haccombe. A footpath leads to Coombe Cellars on the River Teign.
- Haccombe is a small hamlet below the St Marychurch road. Its small chapel is dedicated to Saint Blaise. Haccombe House is a "nondescript Georgian structure" (Pevsner): built ca. 1800: the chapel is in the grounds; the estate being the historic home of Sir Thomas Carew, 1st Baronet (1595–1640). The benefice is occupied by an incumbent with the rare title of Archpriest. The archpresbytery was established in 1341 with six clergy: only the archpriest survived at the Reformation. The parish is combined with that of Stoke-in-Teignhead with Combe-in-Teignhead.
- Plant World. A garden centre and a large garden which is designed as a map of the world, with rare plants grown relevant to their location on the map. It is significant for the cultivation of giant Echiums.
- Rocombe. A small hamlet at the bottom of the valley on the lane towards Stokeinteignhead.
- Maidencombe, about 2.5 miles (4.0 km) distant, is the closest beach to Coffinswell. It is also a small village (recognised by Torbay Council) on the coast of Lyme Bay.
- Daccombe. A small hamlet of thatched cottages and a campsite. It is at the head of the valley of the Aller Brook. The name is first attested in 1178 as Daccumba. The name was once thought to come from an Old English personal name Dæcca + cumb ("valley"), in which case it once meant "Dæcca's valley". But Eilert Ekwall noted that this provided a poor explanation for the attested spellings, and argued that the first element came from an Old English common noun *dāc ("jackdaw") and that the name thus meant "jackdaw valley" (though he thought that the better attested Old English word dā "doe" could provide an alternative explanation).
- Barton. A suburb of Torquay. Barton Hall, a former manor house, is here. In recent years it has been a holiday camp and adventure centre with a dry ski slope.
- Kingskerswell is a large village separated from Coffinswell by a hill. Mainly residential, it is on the old Torquay to Newton Abbot road.

== Landscape ==
Most of the landscape around Coffinswell is hilly farmland. Traditional Devon hedgerows form field boundaries, and have existed at least since Norman times. Most of the flora is native, with the exception of cultivated or non-native flora in private gardens and horticultural sites, e.g. rhododendrons around Haccombe and gorse and pines near Milber.

=== Water courses, rivers and hydrology ===
Coffinswell sits in the Daccombe or Aller Brook drainage basin. The Aller Brook flows west toward Aller, Newton Abbot, before entering the River Teign which empties into Lyme Bay at Teignmouth. Water collection on the east side of the Daccombe drainage basin or the Watcombe drainage basin flows through Barton and Watcombe into Babbacombe bay at Watcombe beach. Likewise water collection on the north side of the drainage basin collects in Haccombe and flows toward the River Teign.

== Notable residents ==
The botanist and illustrator Rev. W. Keble Martin was Rector here in the 1920s, and studied the local flora. During his time Michael Constantine de Courcy, 33rd Baron Kingsale (1855–1931) lived in Coffinswell.

Sarah Buck, the first woman President of the Institution of Structural Engineers, (2008) lives in the village.
