= List of road junctions in the United Kingdom: T =

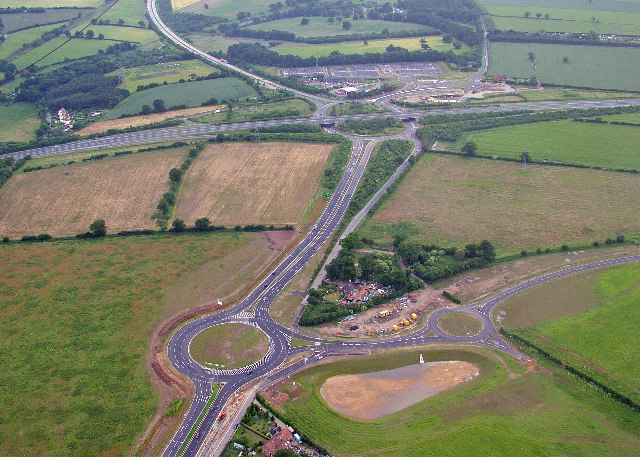
Thickthorn Interchange

This is part of the list of road junctions in the United Kingdom.

Many road junctions are named after pubs. For more information regarding the derivation of pub names see pub names.

== T ==
Junction Name	Type	Location	Roads	Grid Reference	Notes
Taddington Wood Junction		Chatham, Kent	M2 J3; A229 Taddington Wood Spur	TQ749625	
Talke Roundabout		Talke, Staffordshire	A34; A500; Peacock Hay Road	SJ833518	
Tally Ho Corner		Finchley, LB Barnet	A1000 Finchley High Road (formerly A1); A598 Ballards Lane	TQ263922	
Tankersley Park Roundabout		Chapeltown, South Yorkshire	A61; A616	SK337990	
Target Roundabout	Roundabout Interchange	Northolt, LB Ealing	A40 Western Avenue; A312 Church Road	51°32′34″N 0°22′40″W	
Tartendown Cross	Crossroads	Landrake, Cornwall	unclass.; unclass.	SX361614	
Tattenhoe Roundabout		Snelshall, Milton Keynes	H8 (A421) Standing Way; V1 Snelshall Street; B4034	51°59′22″N 0°47′06″W	
Tavistock Cross		Bere Alston, Devon	B3257; unclass.	SX457672	
Tebay		Tebay, Cumbria	M6 J38; A685; B6260	54°26′15″N 2°35′41″W	
Telford Central		Telford	M54 J5; A442; B5072	52°41′01″N 2°26′58″W	
Telford West		Telford	M54 J6; A5223	52°41′18″N 2°29′22″W	
Temple Bar Interchange	Grade separated dumbbell roundabouts	Westhampnett, West Sussex	A27 Arundel Road; A285 Stane Street; Old Arundel Road; Unclassified, (access road)	SU 89571 06732	
Temple Circus Gyratory		Bristol	A4; A4044; B4053; unclass.	51°26′59″N 2°35′07″W	
Tempsford Bridge Turn		Tempsford	A1 (N/B only); School Lane	52°10′40″N 0°18′09″W	
Testo's Roundabout		West Boldon, South Tyneside, Tyne and Wear	A19; A184	54°56′32″N 1°28′26″W	Named after Alfred Testo, a former flea circus ringmaster who later ran a filling station on the site of what is now Enterprise Rent-A-Car.
Thackeray's Lane		Woodthorpe, Nottingham, Nottinghamshire	A6211 Thackeray's Lane; A6211 Arno Vale Road; Wensley Road; Worcester Road; Breck Hill Road; Thackeray's Lane	SK583442	
Thelbridge Cross	Crossroads	near Witheridge, North Devon	B3042; unclass. Thelbridge Hill; unclass. Hele Lane Hill	50.8948°N 3.7217°W	Named on fingerpost
Thetford Corner		Little Thetford, Cambridgeshire	A10; The Wyches; Red Fen Road	TL527766	
Thickthorn		Cringleford, Norwich, Norfolk	A47; A11; B1172 (formerly A11)	52°36′12″N 1°13′26″E	
Thistle Corner		Ely, Cambridgeshire	B1382 Prickwillow Road; Clayway Drove	TL556815	
Thornton Heath Pond		Thornton Heath, London Borough of Croydon	A23; A235; B226	51°23′38″N 0°06′53″W	
Thorley Wash Roundabout		Thorley Street, Hertfordshire	A1184 St James Way; A1184 London Road; B1529 London Road	TL488184	
Thorpe Interchange		Thorpe, Surrey	M25 J12; M3 J2	51°24′03″N 0°32′16″W	
Three Holes Cross		near Wadebridge, Cornwall	A39; unclass.; unclass.	SX012737	
Three Lamps		Totterdown, Bristol	A4; A37	51°26′39″N 2°34′42″W	Named for the historic sign post at the Junction, this is where the Bath Road (A4) and the Wells Road (A37) diverge.
Three Pigeons		Milton Common, Oxfordshire	M40 J7; A329; A40	51°43′28″N 1°03′25″W	
Threekingham Bar		Threekingham, Lincolnshire	A15; A52	TF073368	
Thulston Roundabout		Thulston, Derbyshire	A6; B5010	52°53′05″N 1°24′12″W	
Tibbet's Corner		Putney Heath, London	A3 Kingston Road; A3 West Hill; A219 Tibbet's Ride; A219 Wimbledon Park Side	51°26′54″N 0°13′23″W	
Tickford Roundabout		Newport Pagnell, Milton Keynes	H3 Monks Way (A422); A509 London Road; B526 Tickford Street	SP887429	
Tilbrook Roundabout		Caldecotte, Milton Keynes	V10 Brickhill Street; Caldecotte Lane Drive	52°00′20″N 0°41′44″W	
Tingey's Corner		Upper Caldecote, Bedfordshire	A1; Biggleswade Road	TL181460	
Tingley Interchange	Roundabout Interchange	Tingley, West Yorkshire	M62 motorway; A653 Dewsbury Road; A650 Bradford Road	53°43′59″N 1°34′35″W	
Tinsley Roundabout		Tinsley, South Yorkshire	M1 J34 (Southern Roundabout); A631; A6178	53°24′48″N 1°24′07″W	
Todhills		Todhills, Cumbria	A74; unclass. road to Rockliffe; unclass.	NY370678	
Tollbar Island		Coventry, West Midlands	A45; A46; B4110; Siskin Drive	52°22′42″N 1°27′59″W	
Toll Plaza Interchange		Erskine, Glasgow	M898 J1; A898; A726; B815	55°54′47″N 4°28′20″W	
Tolworth Junction		LB Kingston	A3 Tolworth Rise; A240 Tolworth Broadway; A240 Kingston Road	51°22′45″N 0°16′50″W	
Tong (aka Cosford)		Tong, Shropshire	M54 J3; A41	52°39′32″N 2°17′59″W	
Tongwell Roundabout		Tongwell, Milton Keynes	H4 Dansteed Way; V11 Tongwell Street; Michigan Drive	52°04′01″N 0°43′14″W	
Tooting Broadway	Crossroads	Tooting, London	A24 Upper Tooting Road; A24 Tooting High Street; A217 Garratt Lane; A217 Mitcham Road	51°25′41″N 0°10′5″W	Named after the nearby tube station.
Tower Hill	Crossroads	The City, London	A100; A3211; A1203; A1211	51°30′35″N 0°04′28″W	
Tottenham Hale Gyratory		Tottenham Hale, LB Haringey	A10; A1055; A503	51°35′19″N 0°03′46″W	
Townhead Interchange		Glasgow	M8 J15; A8; A803	55°52′03″N 4°14′06″W	
Townshend Roundabout		Worle, North Somerset	Townshend Road; Wansbrough Road; Becket Road	51°22′18.36″N 2°54′47.82″W	
Traboe Cross	Crossroads	Rosuic Common, Goonhilly Downs, Cornwall	B3293; unclass.	SW736206	
Traveller's Lane Roundabout	Roundabout	Hatfield, Hertfordshire	A1001; Traveller's Lane	51°44′44″N 0°13′26″W	
Travellers Rest		Ross-on-Wye	M50 J4; A449	51°55′47″N 2°33′50″W	
Treacle Mine Roundabout		Grays, Thurrock, Essex	A1306 Arterial Road (old A13); A1012 Hogg Lane; A1012 Elizabeth Road; Lodge Lane (old A13); Long Lane	51°29′43″N 0°19′02″E	aka. Hogg Lane Roundabout. Just south of Stifford Interchange on the "new" A13
Tregeseal Cross Roads	Staggered	St Just in Penwith, Cornwall	A3071; unclass. New Road; unclass., to Numphra	50.1211°N 5.6651°W	
Trehill Cross		St Dominick, Cornwall	unclass.; unclass.	SX395672	
Trekenning		St Columb Major, Cornwall	A39; A3059; unclass.; Station Road	SW912624	
Treliever Cross		Penryn, Cornwall	A39; A394; Treliever Road; unclass.	SW766349	
Treloggan		Lane, Newquay, Cornwall	A392; Treloggan Road; unclass.	SW827601	
Tremethick Cross		Penzance, Cornwall	A3071; unclass.	SW443305	
Trenant Cross		near Looe, Cornwall	unclass.; unclass.	SX235558	
Trengove Cross		Constantine, Cornwall	unclass.; unclass.	SW720305	
Treovis Cross		North Darley, Cornwall	B3254; unclass.	SX280739	
Tresla Cross		Cardinham, Cornwall	unclass.; unclass.	SX130689	
Trevemper		Trevemper, Newquay, Cornwall	A392; A392 Trevemper Road; A3075	SW820599	
Trevorgans Cross		Crows-an-Wra, Cornwall	A30; unclass.	SW400276	
Trewardreva Cross		Constantine, Cornwall	unclass.; unclass.	SW726299	
Trewinnow Cross		near Lewannick, Cornwall	B3254; unclass.; unclass.	SX291791	
Turnford Interchange	Roundabout Interchange	Turnford	A10; Spur to the New River Arms roundabout	51°43′35″N 0°01′59″W	
Turnoak Corner		Woking, Surrey	A320 Egley Road; A320 Guildford Road; A247 Wych Hill Lane; Wych Hill Lane	TQ001576	
Turnpike Roundabout		Swindon, Wiltshire	A419; A4311	SU153894	
Tushmore Gyratory		Crawley, West Sussex	A23; A2201; A2219	51°07′30″N 0°11′16″W	
Tweenaways Cross	Signal-controlled crossroads	Paignton, Devon	A380; A385; A3022	50.42866°N 3.58891°W	
Tweentown Roundabout		Cheddar, Somerset	B3135 Cliff Street; B3135 Tweentown Street	51°16′45″N 2°46′29″W	
Twin Bridges (Roundabout)		Bracknell, Berkshire	A3095 Church Road; A3095 Bagshott Road; Hazel Hill; Market Street; Unclass.	51°24′49″N 0°44′58″W	The roundabout is crossed by the Waterloo-Reading railway line on two bridges.
Two Headed Man		Bath and North East Somerset	A39; B3116; unclass.	51°22′27″N 2°28′40″W	Named for the sculpture? of a man looking both Ways on the corner of a former toll house on the junction
