= Combeinteignhead =

Village in Devon, England

Coordinates: 50°32′N 3°33′W

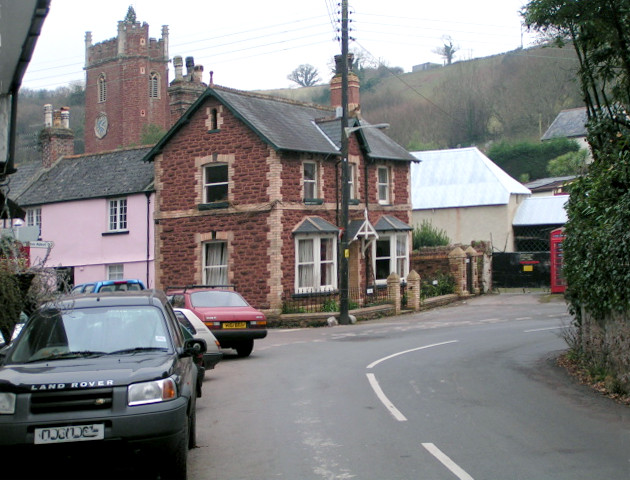
- Combeinteignhead

- Location within Devon
- Population: 729 (Haccombe with Combe parish) (2001 Census)
- OS grid reference: SX902716
- Civil parish: Haccombe with Combe
- District: Teignbridge
- Shire county: Devon
- Region: South West
- Country: England
- Sovereign state: United Kingdom
- Post town: Newton Abbot
- Postcode district: TQ12
- Dialling code: 01626
- Police: Devon and Cornwall
- Fire: Devon and Somerset
- Ambulance: South Western
- UK Parliament: Newton Abbot

Combeinteignhead or Combe-in-Teignhead is a village in the civil parish of Haccombe with Combe, in the Teignbridge district, in south Devon, England. It lies between Newton Abbot and Shaldon, about half a mile (1 km) inland from the estuary of the River Teign.

Despite this closeness to the River Teign, the name Combeinteignhead is not derived from it: in the Domesday Book the district contained thirteen manors which totalled an area of ten hides and the whole area was known as the "Ten Hide". This was later corrupted to Teignhead through the influence of the river name. It is one of the longest place names in England, with 16 letters. The name of the nearby village of Stokeinteignhead has a similar derivation.

The village has two historic pubs: the Wild Goose Inn, originally called the Country House Inn, a 17th-century tavern in the centre of the village, and the Coombe Cellars Inn, right on the estuary of the River Teign. Coombe Cellars was an early base for the local fishing industry and was also used by smugglers.

The village church (dedicated to All Saints) has ancient origins: Bishop Bronescombe dedicated two altars here in 1259, and the high altar was dedicated in 1339. The present building dates from the 14th and 15th centuries; it was restored in the 1880s, but retains its 12th century font. Henry de Bracton was rector here for a short time in the 13th century. The pews have fascinating carved bench ends dating from Elizabethan times. These include many well known and obscure saints as well as wild men, animals, St George in armour spearing a dog-like dragon, and some depictions that are difficult to identify. They may be the finest wood carvings in Devon.

The nearby almshouses built of red sandstone were founded in 1620 by William Bourchin.

Combeinteignhead was designated as a conservation area in December 2000.

On 25 March 1885 the parish was abolished and merged with Haccombe to form "Haccombe with Combe". At the 1881 census (the last before the abolition of the parish), Combe in Teignhead had a population of 423.
