= Arthur Judd =

English cricketer

Personal information
- Full name: Arthur Kenneth Judd
- Born: 1 January 1904; Sunbury-on-Thames, Middlesex, England
- Died: 15 February 1988 (aged 84); Abbotskerswell, Devon, England
- Batting: Right-handed
- Bowling: Leg break

Domestic team information
- Years: Team
- 1925–1935: Hampshire
- 1927: Cambridge University
- 1935: Marylebone Cricket Club

Career statistics
Competition	First-class
Matches	84
Runs scored	2,624
Batting average	21.33
100s/50s	2/11
Top score	124
Balls bowled	1,403
Wickets	30
Bowling average	34.53
5 wickets in innings	1
10 wickets in match	–
Best bowling	6/65
Catches/stumpings	31/–
- Source: Cricinfo, 19 February 2010

Arthur Kenneth Judd (1 January 1904 — 15 February 1988) was an English first-class cricketer and British official in Colonial Nigeria.

== Life and first-class cricket ==
Judd was born at Sunbury-on-Thames in January 1904. He was educated at St Paul's School, before matriculating to St Catharine's College, Cambridge. Judd made his debut in first-class cricket for Hampshire against Northamptonshire at Northampton in the 1925 County Championship. He made eleven first-class appearances for Hampshire the following season, after the end of the summer semester at Cambridge, with Judd scoring his maiden century against Warwickshire at Portsmouth, Having played without success at Cambridge in the freshman match during his first year Cambridge, Judd found himself in the Cambridge University team in 1927, largely due Duleepsinhji suffering from illness. He made twelve appearances for Cambridge that season, scoring 667 runs at an average of 39.23; he top-scored in The University Match against Oxford University at Lord's, making 124 in the Cambridge second innings to contribute toward a 116 runs victory. As a result, he gained his blue. Later in the season, he played a handful of County Championship matches.

During the winter which followed, Judd toured the West Indies with Lord's Tennyson's touring team, during which he played in three first-class matches against Jamaica. Having graduated from Cambridge, he played for Hampshire ten times in 1928, but did not feature in 1929. He again played in 1930, playing a full season with 21 appearances for Hampshire, in addition to playing for the South of England against the Marylebone Cricket Club (MCC). His 22 first-class matches in 1930 yielded him 693 runs at an average of 19.80, He made six appearances for Hampshire in 1931, alongside an appearance for the Free Foresters against Cambridge University. It was in 1931 that Jupp accepted a post with the Colonial Office in Colonial Nigeria, which greatly limited his availability for Hampshire. He subsequently only played a nine further matches for the county until 1935, in addition to playing twice more for the Free Foresters (1933 and 1935) and for the MCC (1935). In 64 first-class appearances for Hampshire, he scored 1,625 runs at a batting average of 17.47. With his leg break bowling, he took 28 wickets for Hampshire at a bowling average of 33.07, taking one five wicket haul with figures of 6 for 65 against Somerset at Weston-super-Mare in 1928.

While undertaking colonial service, he toured Egypt with Hubert Martineau's XI against the national team, which consisted of British officials. He continued to play minor matches in Nigeria until 1938. Judd died in February 1988 at Abbotskerswell, Devon.
