= Samuel Barter =

American politician

Samuel Barter (February 14, 1828 – December 16, 1908) was a member of the Wisconsin (USA) State Assembly in 1879.

Barter was born on February 14, 1828, in Kingskerswell, England. He came to Wisconsin in 1849, living in Markesan and originally employed as a merchant, later becoming a member of the county board of supervisors in Green Lake County. He then elected as a "president" of Markesan Village and was a Republican. He died in Hudson, Wisconsin.
