= William Keble Martin =

British painter

The Rev. William Keble Martin (9 July 1877 – 26 November 1969) was a Church of England priest, botanist and botanical illustrator, known for his Concise British Flora in Colour, published in May 1965 when the author was 88.

The book was the result of 60 years of fieldwork and painting skills and became an immediate bestseller. He completed over 1,400 colour paintings and many black-and-white drawings before the book was finally published.

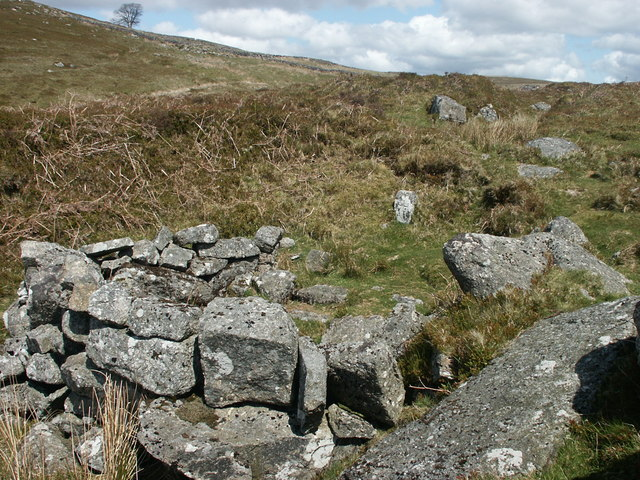
Keble Martin "Chapel" by the Western Walla Brook, Dartmoor

== Life and work ==
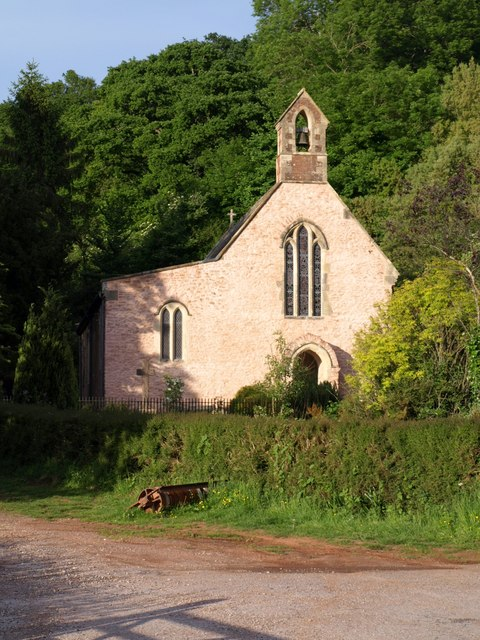
St Blaise, Haccombe, Reverend Martin held the position of Archpriest here from 1921 to 1934.

Keble Martin was born in Radley, Oxfordshire, the grandson of Dr George Moberly, headmaster of Winchester and later Bishop of Salisbury. He was brother to architect Arthur Campbell Martin and was also connected to John Keble of the Oxford Movement. His father was appointed as the Rector of Dartington, near Totnes, when William was 14 years old.

He was educated at Marlborough, and went up to Christ Church, Oxford in 1896 to read Greek Philosophy and Botany. He trained for the church at Cuddesdon Theological College. After ordination, he worked in industrial parishes in the north and Midlands (one of these was Wath-upon-Dearne, the subject of his first book) and, in the First World War, as a chaplain in France. In 1921 he was offered the benefice of Haccombe and Coffinswell in Devon and in 1934 became the incumbent of St Michael and All Angels, Great Torrington. (He was the Archpriest of Haccombe and Rector of Coffinswell.) Keble Martin saw a vision of a new church in a dream, and his brother architect transformed the dream into reality - now a listed building, St Luke the Evangelist Church at Milber, Newton Abbot is remarkable for its exceptional interior space and extraordinary plan with three angled naves, linked by arcades with granite columns, which converge on the central altar. The exterior walls are white render with a pyramidal copper-clad roof on a squat square tower. Keble Martin retired in 1949 at the age of 72, but continued to work in the church.

He was elected a Fellow of the Linnean Society in 1928, and later edited with G. T. Fraser the first volume of a comprehensive Flora of Devon (1939). In June 1966 he received an honorary degree of Doctor of Science (D.Sc.) from Exeter University. Four of his designs for an issue of wild flower stamps were accepted by the Royal Mail and issued in April 1967. He published his autobiography, Over the Hills, shortly before he died in 1969 at the age of 92 at Woodbury, East Devon.

== Family life ==
William Keble Martin married twice: in 1909 to Violet Chaworth-Musters (d. 1963) and then in 1965 to Florence Lewis. His children were three daughters and two sons.

== Bibliography of Martin's published work ==
- A History of the Ancient Parish of Wath-upon-Dearne Wath-upon-Dearne: W. E. Farthing (1920)
- W. Keble Martin & Fraser, Gordon Travers (eds.) Flora of Devon [Vol. 1] Phanerogams, vascular Cryptogams, Charophyta: promoted by the Devonshire Association; edited by ... W. Keble Martin ... Gordon T. Fraser ... With the assistance of ... Thomas Stephenson ... Francis M. Day. Arbroath: T. Buncle & Co. (1939)
- The Concise British Flora in Colour; with nomenclature edited by Douglas H. Kent and foreword by The Duke of Edinburgh. London: Ebury Press/ Michael Joseph (1965)
  - The 2nd edition of the Flora was published in 1969: from 1965 to 1978 12 impressions were issued altogether of the three editions.
  - ------ with nomenclature edited and revised by Douglas H. Kent, 3rd ed. Ebury Press, 1974
- Over The Hills---- (autobiography), London: Michael Joseph (1968)
- The New Concise British Flora; with nomenclature edited and revised by Douglas H. Kent and foreword by The Duke of Edinburgh. London: Book Club Associates by arrangement with Ebury Press/ Michael Joseph (1982)
