= Shaldon Zoo =

Zoo in Shaldon, Devon

Shaldon Zoo Wildlife Trust
- Interactive map of Shaldon Zoo Wildlife Trust
- 50°32′12″N 3°29′56″W
- Date opened: 1963
- Location: Shaldon, Devon, England
- Land area: 1 acre (0.40 ha)
- Memberships: BIAZA; EAZA
- Website: shaldonwildlifetrust.org.uk

Shaldon Zoo also known as Shaldon Wildlife Trust is a conservation centre in Shaldon, Devon. Set in an acre of woodland above the village near to the coastline, they look after and help preserve some of the rarest and most endangered animals in the world, with a focus on small primates.

The zoo is a member of BIAZA, the British and Irish Association of Zoos and Aquariums and also a member of EAZA, the European Association of Zoos and Aquaria.

== History ==
The zoo started out as a children's zoo in 1963, before becoming the Shaldon Wildlife Trust in 1985, for the conservation of small endangered species. Despite its small size, Shaldon Zoo has proven itself to be highly regarded globally for its conservation work and breeding programmes. In 2024, founder of the Trust, Stewart Muir, received a lifetime achievement award from EAZA.

== Animal overview ==
Shaldon Zoo cares for over 50 species of mammals, birds and reptiles. Many of the animals are part of managed breeding programmes. The zoo is also home to many rare species including Pygmy slow lorises, Owston's palm civets, Lemur leaf frogs, Bali mynas and Blue-eyed black lemurs.

=== Mammals ===
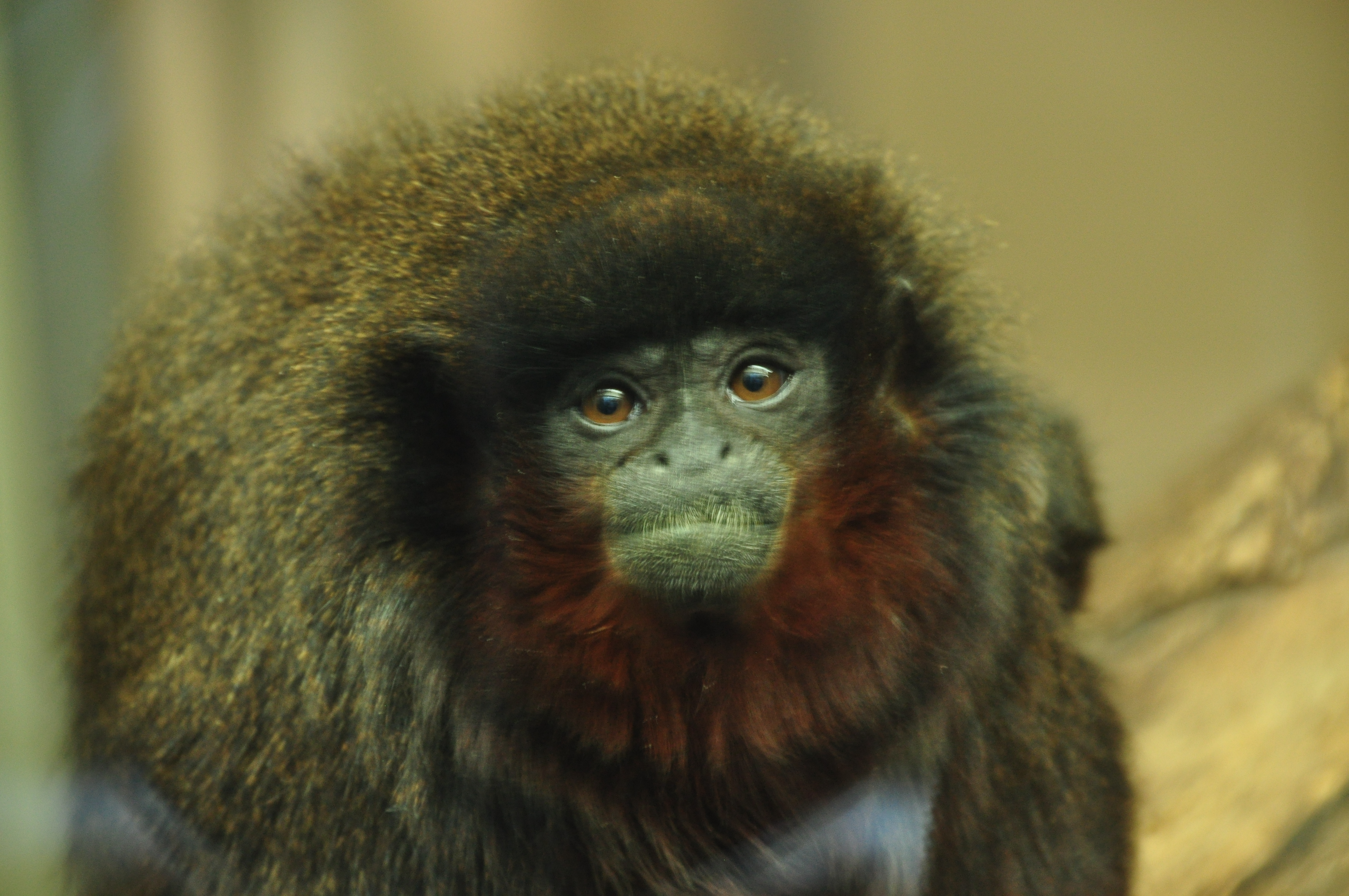
Red-titi monkey at Shaldon Zoo

The zoo focuses mainly on primates including the Red-titi monkeys, Ring tailed lemurs, Yellow-breasted capuchins, Grey slender lorises, Common squirrel monkeys, Cotton-top tamarins, Grey mouse lemurs, Pied tamarins, Pygmy marmosets, Red-bellied lemurs and Red-ruffed lemurs.

Other mammals include Margays, Meerkats, Azara's agoutis, Binturongs, Southern three-banded armadillos, Prevost's squirrels and Brush-tailed bettongs.

=== Birds ===
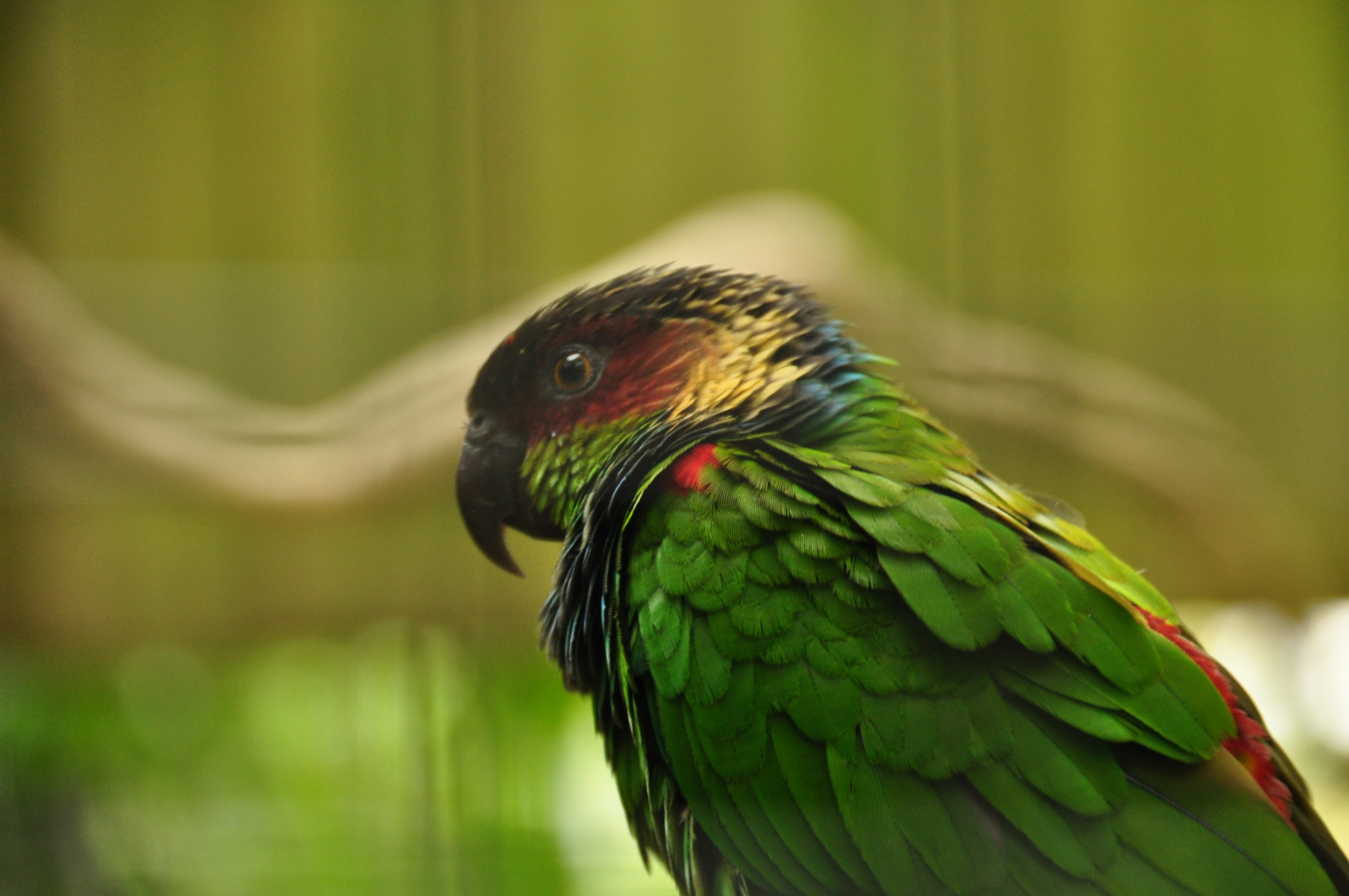
Blue-throated conure at Shaldon Zoo

The zoo's collection of birds includes Black-cheeked lovebirds, Northern white-faced owls and Blue-throated conures.

=== Reptiles & Amphibians ===
The zoo is home to Yellow-footed tortoises, Blue poison dart frogs, Yellow-headed day geckos, Golden mantellas and Phantasmal poison frogs, among other species.

== Conservation ==
Shaldon Zoo currently has conservation programmes for the Blue-eyed black lemur, Pygmy slow loris, Owston's palm civet, Cotton-top tamarin and Pied tamarin.

For over 20 years, Shaldon Zoo has been working to protect the Owston's palm civet, working closely with a Vietnamese charity Save Vietnam's Wildlife on conservation and breeding. The zoo is one of only 3 outside Asia that house them.

In 2017, the zoo successfully bred critically endangered Lemur leaf frogs, usually native to South America. Later that year, the zoo was the first in the world to keep three breeding pairs of the endangered Pygmy slow loris.

In January 2025, Shaldon Zoo welcomed a healthy female Margay kitten, born on site, which is a significant step in efforts to conserve this elusive wild cat species.

In July 2025, the zoo became the first in the UK to house a pair of rare Goodman's mouse lemur, from Zoo Zurich as part of a breeding programme by EAZA.

== Education ==
Shaldon Zoo aims to increase knowledge and understanding of animal conservation and the vital work being done to protect some of the most vulnerable animals. They achieve this through animal interactions, educational talks and opportunities for volunteers and students to gain experience.

== Incidents ==
In 2004, Shaldon Zoo was targeted in two separate raids resulting in the theft of 16 rare primates including marmosets, tamarins and squirrel monkeys.
