= Abbotskerswell =

Village in Devon, England

Coordinates: 50.5092°N 3.6152°W

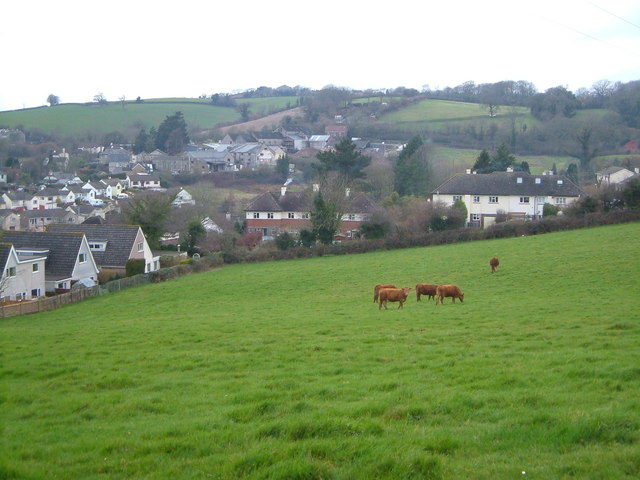
- The village of Abbotskerswell is surrounded by fields

- Location within Devon
- Population: 1,267
- OS grid reference: SX855690
- District: Teignbridge
- Shire county: Devon
- Region: South West
- Country: England
- Sovereign state: United Kingdom
- Post town: NEWTON ABBOT
- Postcode district: TQ12
- Dialling code: 01626
- Police: Devon and Cornwall
- Fire: Devon and Somerset
- Ambulance: South Western
- UK Parliament: Newton Abbot

Abbotskerswell is a village and civil parish in the English county of Devon. The village is in the north part of the parish and is located two miles (3 km) south of the town of Newton Abbot, 7 miles (11 km) from the seaside resort of Torquay and 32 miles (51 km) from the city of Plymouth. The A381 road between Newton Abbot and Totnes runs down the western side of the parish and the main railway line between these two towns forms part of its eastern boundary.

== History ==
The settlement that is now Abbotskerswell was called Cærswylle in 956, Carsvelle in 1086 and Kareswill in 1242, meaning 'cress spring' from the Old English cærse + wylle. The name 'Abbotskerswell' itself is derived from 'Kerswell belonging to the abbot' [of Horton] and was recorded as Karswill Abbatts in 1285, Abbotescharswelle in 1314 and Abbots Keswell in 1675.

In the Domesday Book Abbotskerswell was listed as Carsuella in the ancient hundred of Kerswell, and was held by the abbot of Horton Abbey, Dorset. The name kerswell means cress spring. In 1086 it had a population of less than one hundred. The parish later became part of Haytor Hundred when it was derived from Kerswell Hundred. By 1901 the population had risen to 451 and to 1,515 by 2001.

The village church, dedicated to St Mary, was affected by the Dissolution of the Monasteries in the reign of Henry VIII. Old treasures, particularly a large badly damaged medieval statue assumed to be of the Virgin and Child, have been found within the church, and work has been undertaken to restore them. The north aisle is of the Perpendicular period and the western tower has diagonal buttresses and a stair turret in the centre of one side.

Abbotskerswell developed around the growing of apples and oranges for cider making. Henley's Devonshire Cider was made by a company based in nearby Newton Abbot from apples grown in the extensive orchards around the village, and their presses were here too.

In 1850, according to White's Devonshire Directory:

ABBOTSKERSWELL, or Abbot's Carswell, is a pleasant village, two miles S. of Newton Abbot, and has in its parish 433 souls and 1600 acres of land, including several scattered houses and the hamlet of Aller, where there is a paper mill, on a rivulet 1 ½ mile from the church. The soil is all freehold, and belongs to Sir W.P. Carew, Bart., the Hon. Mrs. Hare, W. Hole, Esq., Wm. and John Creed, and a few smaller owners. The Church (St. Mary,) is an ancient fabric in the perpendicular style, with a tower and three bells. It is about to be thoroughly repaired and beautified. The old pews are to give way to open benches, and the finely carved oak screen is to be restored and opened. . . . A cottage has been converted into a Baptist Chapel; and in the parish is a Quaker's Burial Ground, which was reserved for that purpose by a Mr. Tucket, when he sold Court Barton estate. Here is a small National School.

== Today ==
The village has several listed buildings, a small shop with post office facilities, (with a hair salon (residents only) on the upper floor), a primary school and one pub. The Court Farm Inn was previously a farm, and was converted to a pub in the 20th century when the old Tradesmans Arms closed. The other pub was the older Butchers Arms, which was originally a smithy, it is now closed. The village post office was closed by Royal Mail in 2008, it is now a tearoom. There is a park with sports facilities and an all-weather pitch. The village has a local bus (Country Bus Devon).

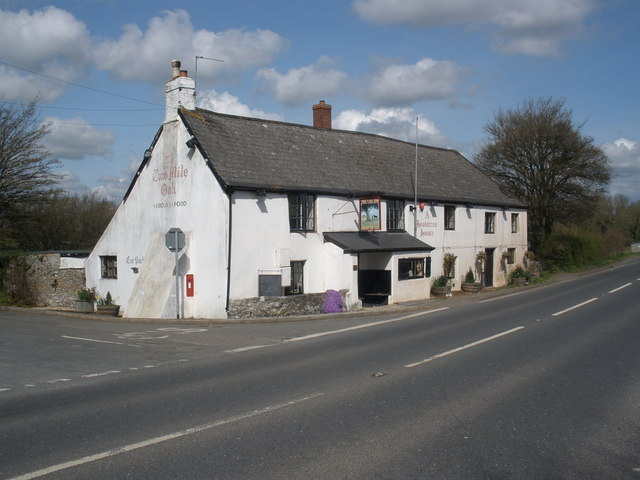
The Two Mile Oak pub on the A381 road

Also in the parish a minor road crosses the A381 road at Two Mile Oak Cross where there is a public house and a few houses.

The village hosts the annual "Abbfest" Beer and Food festival which celebrates Devon food and drink.

As of 2010, the village has two teams in the South Devon Football League: the main team is in the Premier Division, and the Reserves in Division Four. Their ground is at Abbots Park. Abbotskerswell Cricket Club has three adult teams, the first team playing at A division in the Devon Cricket League, the second team playing in the E division (West) and the newly reformed (2022) third team playing home games at Stover School in the H Division (West). There is a Sunday/Midweek friendly side and two youth teams and the Women's softball cricket team are (2022) Devon Super-8's and Devon County Women's Softball League Champions. The ground (known as 'The Oak') is situated on the main A381 Totnes Road just outside the village near the Two Mile Oak public house..

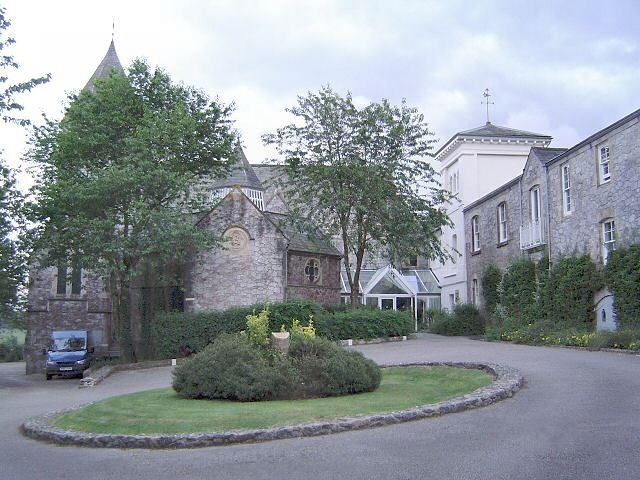
St Augustine's Priory - Abbotskerswell.

For over a hundred years, 1861 to 1983, Abbotskerswell Priory, situated just north of the parish boundary, was home to an Order of Augustinian nuns. When the nuns left in the 1980s, the buildings were converted into apartments and cottages for the elderly.

== Landscape ==
Abbotskerswell's landscape is mainly hilly. The village lies in a valley and to the north there are fields and to the South there is a forest. Through the village run two streams which meet at the village park. After high rainfall, it sometimes overflows. Some of the fields are home to Cows, Sheep and Horses.

== Transport ==
The A381 road provides the most direct route to Newton Abbot. Another nearby route is the A380 road to Exeter which also connects to the A3022 to Torbay and A385 to Totnes.

== Nearby settlements ==
These are nearby settlements taken clockwise from Newton Abbot:

- Decoy
- Kingskerswell
- Stoneycombe
- Whiddon
- Two Mile Oak
- Ogwell
- Wolborough

== Twin cities/towns ==
- (Republic of Ireland) – Ardmore, County Waterford, Ireland
- – Le Pré-d'Auge and Les Monceaux, France

== Notable people ==
- John 'Babbacombe' Lee, known as "The Man They Couldn't Hang" was born in the village in 1864.
- Arthur Judd, first-class cricketer, died here in 1988.
- Jack Davey, ran the Court Farm public house in the village.
