= Whiddon =

Whiddon is a surname. Notable people with the surname include:

- Frederick Palmer Whiddon (1930–2002), American university founder and president
- Harry Whiddon (1878–1935), Australian cricketer
- Horace Whiddon (1879–1955), Australian politician
- John Whiddon (died 1576), English judge
- Oliver Whiddon, 16th-century British Anglican archdeacon
- Orren R. Whiddon (1935–2016), United States Army general
- Samuel Whiddon (1848–1905), English-born Australian politician
- Trent Whiddon, Australian dancer and choreographer
