= Thorpe Interchange =

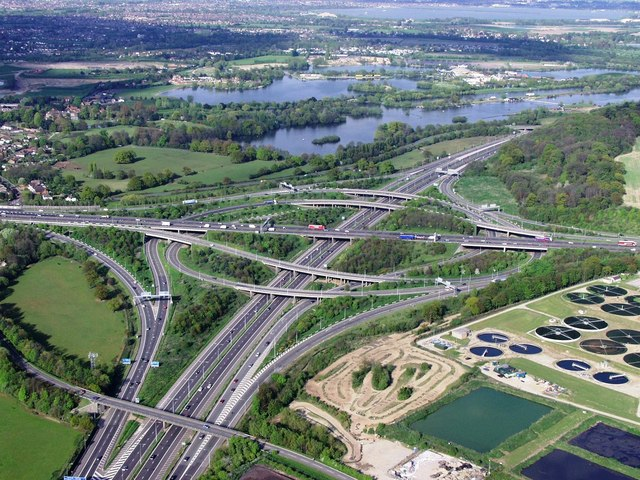
- Thorpe Interchange from the south west in May 2001; it is junction 12 of the M25 and junction 2 of the M3
- Interactive map of Thorpe Interchange

Location
- Surrey
- Coordinates: 51.40°N 0.54°W
- Roads at junction: M3; M25

Construction
- Opened: 9 October 1980
- Maintained by: National Highways

The Thorpe Interchange is a large motorway free-flow intersection in Surrey, United Kingdom, connecting the M3 with the M25.

== History ==
=== M3 ===
The section of the M3 that passes through the interchange (Bagshot A322 to Sunbury Cross A308, junctions 1–3) opened on 11 July 1974. The A316 from Sunbury Cross (eastwards) was improved at the same time. It was the last of four contracts of the first main section of the M3. Construction of this section of the M3 had begun in January 1971. The £12.7 million contract was awarded to A.E. Farr of Westbury, Wiltshire. The section involved building fifty bridges.

=== M25 ===
The section of the M25 to the north began in August 1974 and opened in December 1976. The section of the M25 to the south (Chertsey to Thorpe) began in July 1978 and opened on 9 October 1980.

The M25 north of here to the junction with the M4 junction 15, is one of the busiest roads in the UK. The M25 reached the M4 from the M3 in 1985.

== Construction ==
Construction of the full interchange began in July 1978 and it opened in 1980.

== Structure ==
The junction is junction 2 of the M3, and junction 12 of the M25. The M25 north of the junction is 5 lanes, and south of the junction it is 4 lanes wide. The next junction north along the M25 is the Addlestone Interchange, and south along the M25 is the Runnymede Interchange. The design is a turbine interchange. The B389 (west) and B388 (east) pass east–west close to the north of the interchange. Chertsey is around one mile to the south-east. The Chertsey Branch Line passes close to the south-west, between Virginia Water railway station (to the west), and Chertsey railway station (to the south-east).

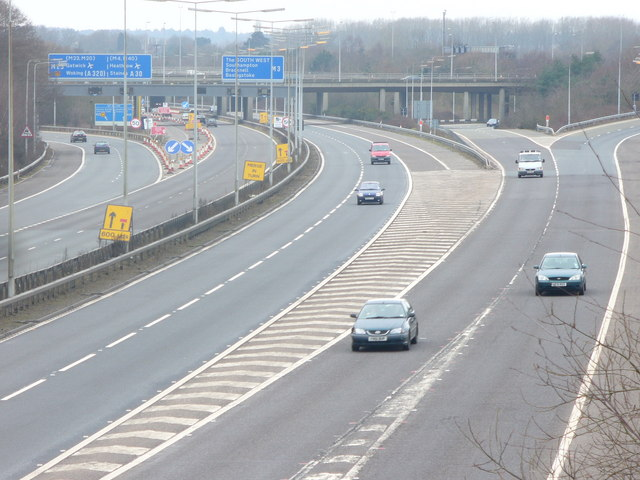
Looking west along the M3 in February 2009
