= Milber =

Housing estate

Coordinates: 50°31′23″N 3°35′25″W

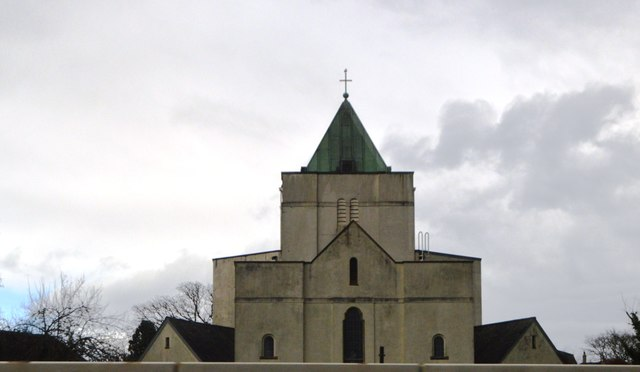
- Church of St Luke the Evangelist

- Location within Devon
- Population: 7,089 (2011 census)
- Civil parish: Newton Abbot
- District: Teignbridge
- Shire county: Devon
- Region: South West
- Country: England
- Sovereign state: United Kingdom

Milber is a suburban area of Newton Abbot and former civil parish, now in the parish of Newton Abbot, in the Teignbridge district of Devon, England. Much of the area comprises a housing estate at grid reference SX8770. It lies to the east of the town centre, on the opposite side of the A380 road. Milber contains mainly houses, but also a trading estate and some shops. The estate is part of the electoral ward called Buckland and Milber. The population of that ward at the 2011 census was 7,089.

Its unusual 20th-century church of St Luke was designed by architect Arthur Campbell Martin & built as a result of a dream experienced by his brother William Keble Martin in 1931. It is partly circular in form with three naves and was completed in 1963. Some of the roads in Milber are named after trees - Hazel Close, Beechwood Avenue and Chestnut Drive being examples of this. The narrow, half mile-long, strip of Ben Stedham's Wood separates Milber from the suburbs of Aller and Newtake: the Iron Age hill fort of Milber Down is at the top of this wood.

A civil parish of Milber existed between 1901 and 1974. It was created covering an area from Haccombe with Combe parish that was transferred into the Newton Abbot Urban District on 1 April 1901. The parish of Milber was classed as an urban parish and so never had a parish council, instead being administered directly by Newton Abbot Urban District Council. The civil parish of Milber was abolished on 1 April 1974 when the three parishes within Newton Abbot Urban District (Milber, Highweek and Wolborough) were united as a single parish called Newton Abbot within the new Teignbridge district. In 1951 the parish had a population of 2260.
