= Shaldon =

Village in Devon, England

Coordinates: 50.5402°N 3.505°W

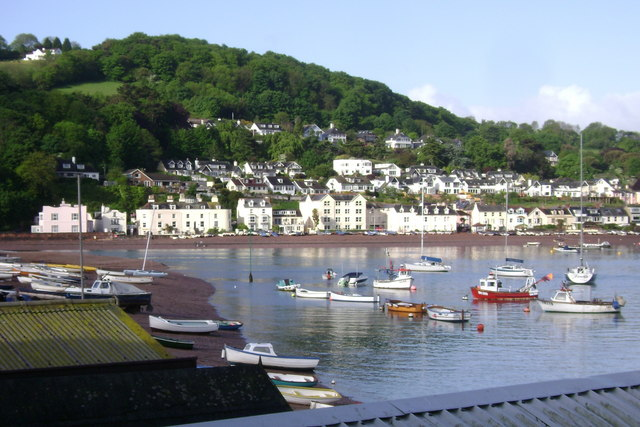
- Shaldon as seen across the estuary from Teignmouth

- Location within Devon
- Population: 1,762 (2011 census)
- Civil parish: Shaldon
- District: Teignbridge
- Shire county: Devon
- Region: South West
- Country: England
- Sovereign state: United Kingdom

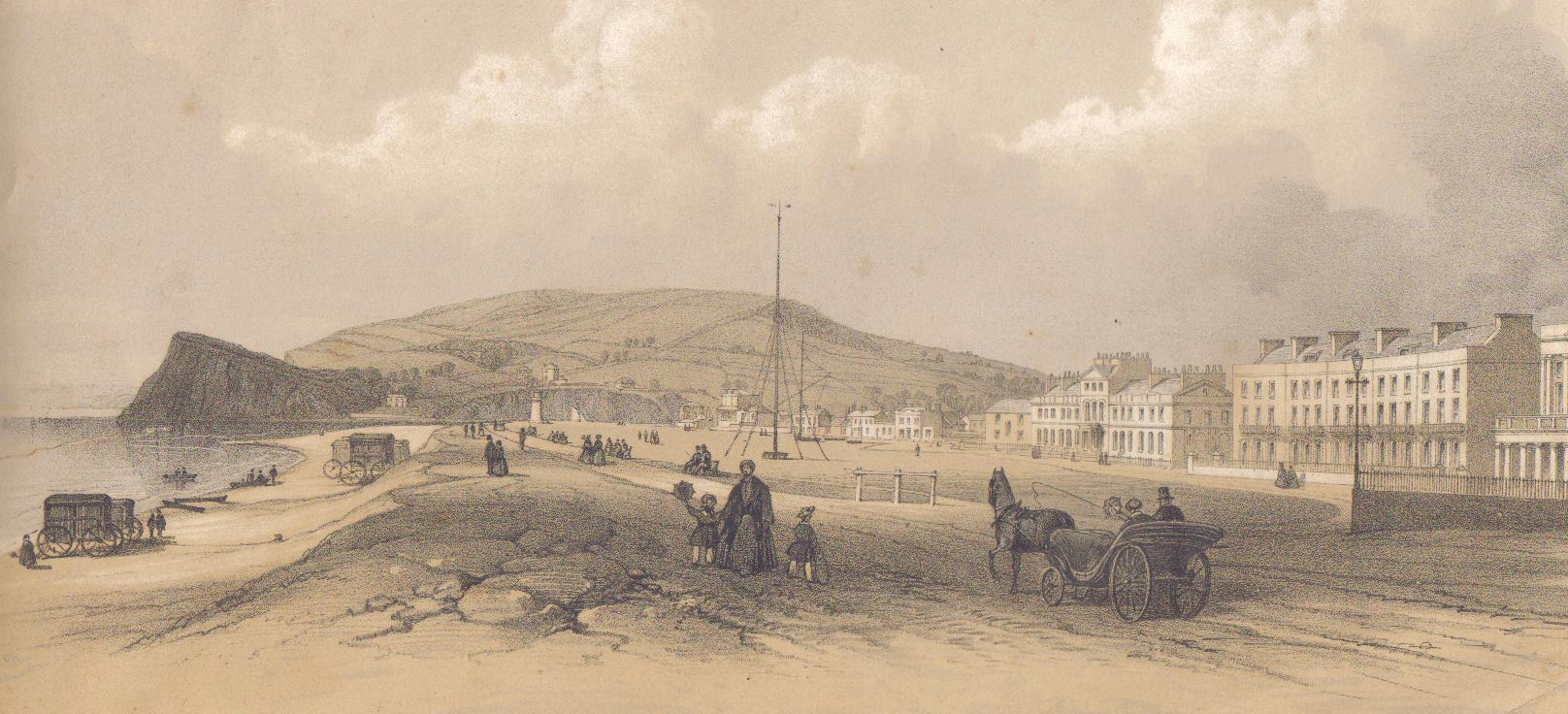
A view of the Ness and Shaldon from Teignmouth in the mid 19th century

Shaldon is a village and civil parish in the Teignbridge district, in south Devon, England, on the south bank of the estuary of the River Teign, opposite Teignmouth. The village is a popular bathing place and is characterized by Georgian architecture.

At the 2021 Census, it had a population of 1,716. Its northern boundary follows the Teign estuary and its eastern boundary, the English Channel. The village is part of the electoral ward of Shaldon and Stokeinteignhead, with a population in 2021 of 2,451.

== History ==
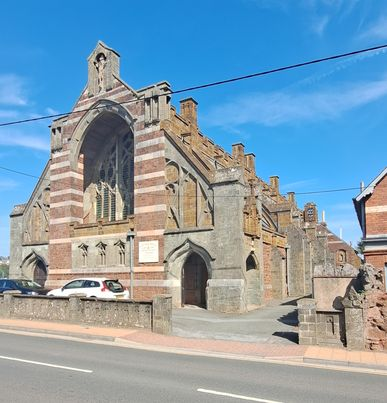
St Peter the Apostle Church of Shaldon

Shaldon was in the hundred of Wonford. The original river settlement was upstream in Ringmore where the valley was farmed, and the inhabitants were hidden from the sea. Up to the beginning of the 20th century, Ringmore had many working farms, extensive apple and other orchards, including cider apples, watercress beds, and withy beds used for making lobster pots. There were also shipbuilding and repair yards on the waterfront.

Shaldon itself is built on reclaimed land, and there is a retaining wall, built around 1800, to prevent the river returning to its beaches. Shaldon was bombed three times during The Blitz, on 15 February 1941 (0 injured/dead), 13 August 1942 (13 dead, 42 injured) and 18 May 1943 (0 injured/dead).

In 2012 a beach hut measuring 23 ft by 6 ft at Shaldon was put on the market for £245,000 and was at that time thought to be the most expensive beach hut in the UK.

== Local government ==
Shaldon is part of Teignbridge local government district, which was created in 1974 under the Local Government Act 1972. The village had previously been in St Nicholas Parish. The parish contained Shaldon and part of the adjacent village of Ringmore, and became part of Teignmouth Urban District in 1881.

== Regatta ==
The Shaldon regatta is one of the oldest in England dating back to at least 1817, if not before. The modern regatta runs for 9 days each August.

== Homeyards Botanical Gardens ==
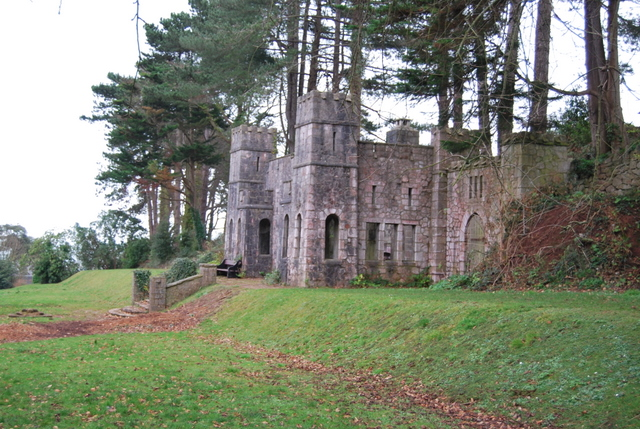
"Shaldon Castle", a folly in Homeyards Botanical Gardens

On a hillside above the village are gardens created by Maria 'Laetitia' Kempe Homeyard in the late 1920s and built by Thomas Rider, consisting of an informal terraced arboretum with a level walk along the top providing views of the Teign estuary and the Jurassic Coast. A feature of the gardens is a folly known as Shaldon Castle. First opened to the public in 1955 and currently under the stewardship of Teignbridge District Council, the gardens are open all year round.

== Shaldon Zoo Wildlife Trust ==
Nestled within an acre of tranquil woodland on the hillside above the village, Shaldon Zoo which opened in the 1960s, is dedicated to caring for and conserving some of the world's rarest and most endangered species.

== Notable people ==
- Roy Sydney Baker-Falkner - WW2 Fleet Air Arm and Battle of Britain pilot, who settled in Shaldon in 1930 with his family after emigrating from Canada. He was killed in 1944 and is remembered at the Shaldon War Memorial.
