= Berry's Wood =

Iron Age hill fort in south Devon, England

Coordinates: 50°31′40″N 3°37′43″W

Berry's Wood is an Iron Age hill fort situated close to Newton Abbot in Devon, England. The fort is situated at about 75 metres above sea level on a commanding promontory above the River Lemon with views down the Teign Estuary. It lies on the hilltop above Bradley Manor.

The fort was first described in print in 1950 by Aileen Fox, who said that its defences consist of a single limestone rampart and a ditch. Its main entrance at the south-eastern end is approached by a sunken lane, and at the north-western end there is a postern. It encloses an area of about 11 acres and the remains of huts can be seen inside.
