= Stokeinteignhead =

Village in Devon, England

Coordinates: 50.524°N 3.530°W

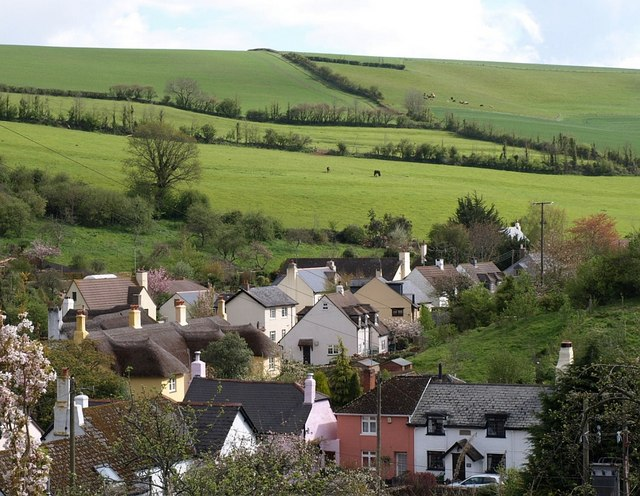
- The village centre

- Location within Devon
- Population: 707 (2001 Census)
- OS grid reference: SX916706
- District: Teignbridge
- Shire county: Devon
- Region: South West
- Country: England
- Sovereign state: United Kingdom
- Post town: Newton Abbot
- Postcode district: TQ12
- Dialling code: 01626
- Police: Devon and Cornwall
- Fire: Devon and Somerset
- Ambulance: South Western
- UK Parliament: Teignbridge

Stokeinteignhead (/ˈstoʊkˌɪnˈtiːnˌhɛd/) is a village and civil parish in the Teignbridge district of Devon, England, above the southern bank of the estuary of the River Teign. The parish has a short boundary on the estuary, and is otherwise surrounded, clockwise from the north, by the parishes of Shaldon, Torbay, Coffinswell and Haccombe with Combe. At the 2021 census, it had a population of 734, which was slightly more than the 703 recorded at the 2011 census. It has been twinned with the French commune of Trévières, Calvados, since 1977.

== History ==
Despite its closeness to the river Teign, the name is not derived from it: in the Domesday Book the district contained thirteen manors which totalled an area of ten hides and the whole area was known as the "Ten Hide". This was later corrupted to "Teignhead" through the influence of the river name. The name of the nearby village of Combeinteignhead has a similar derivation.

Most of the village forms a conservation area and there are over fifty listed buildings nearby.

The mascot of Stokeinteignhead, appearing on the village signs, is the cirl bunting.

== Governance ==
Stokeinteignhead in elections every four years elects one representative to Devon County Council, and one representative to Teignbridge District Council.

The parish council has eight elected councillors with elections every four years.

== Amenities ==
Stokeinteignhead village is the largest settlement of the parish and includes a primary school, pre-school, a community shop and one pub, The Church House Inn.

Stokeinteignhead Village Hall was demolished in 2005 with a plan to re-build it at the same location; it is now in a former part of the school field and construction began in 2006 and was completed some months later.

The village church, dating from the 14th century and enlarged in the 15th, is dedicated to Saint Andrew. Its high altar was dedicated by Bishop Grandisson in 1336. Its rood screen is one of the oldest in Devon and believed to be 14th century; the church also contains the earliest brass engraved to a priest in the county, dated to 1375. The church, which is Grade II* listed, underwent major restoration in 1894 having instructed architects Tait and Harvey.

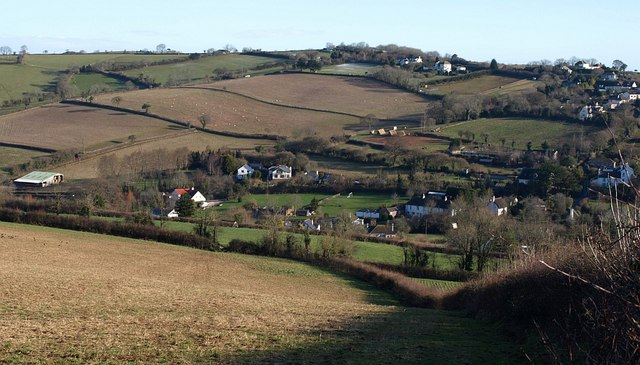
Lower and Higher Gabwell

== Hamlets ==
Lower Gabwell is the second largest hamlet, less than 200 metres (660 ft) from the village centre. About 400 metres (1,300 ft) further south is Higher Gabwell, the largest hamlet.

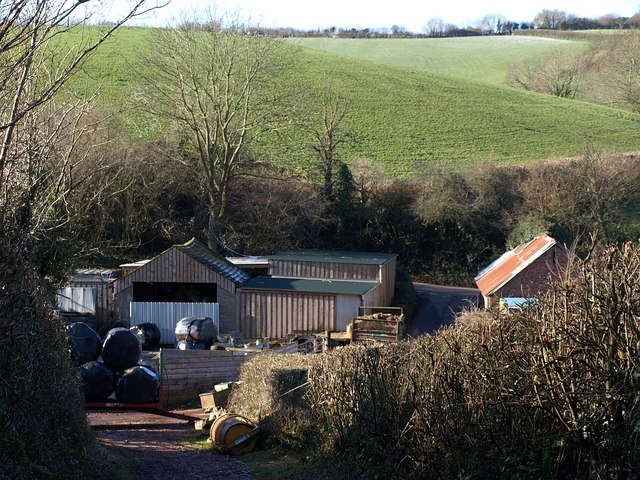
Buildings at Higher Rocombe

The hamlets of Lower, Middle and Higher Rocombe are less than 1 mile (1.6 km) to the west. Across these there are four listed buildings, three focussed around Higher Rocombe Farm and the largest, that of Orchard Farm and adjoining Lower Rocombe Cottage dating back several centuries.

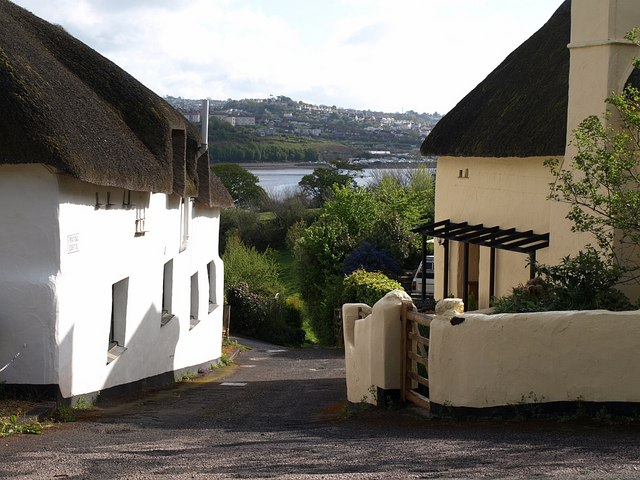
Cottages at Teignharvey and Teign estuary

The hamlet of Teignharvey to the north-west contains a cluster of cottages. Its oldest is Little Harvey, from which the village takes its name, and this (the only important or ancient building) dates to the Tudor period in the early 16th century.
