= Coombe Cellars =

Pub in Combeinteignhead, Devon, UK

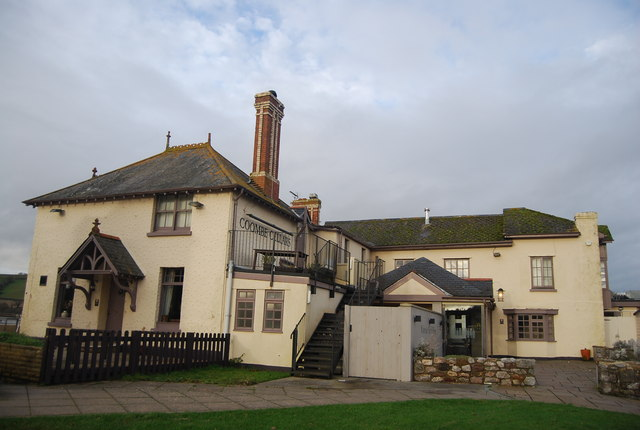
- Coombe Cellars Inn

- Location within Devon

General information
- Location: Near Combeinteignhead, England
- Coordinates: 50.540938°N 3.551063°W

Coombe Cellars Inn is a public house on the south bank of the estuary of the River Teign in south Devon, England. It is in the parish of Haccombe with Combe, near the village of Combeinteignhead. The pub was owned by Brewers Fayre until 2006. As of 2016 it is owned by Mitchells & Butlers.

== History ==
A guide by William Hyett published in 1800 extolled the inn as "standing in a most picturesque situation" and "advancing into the tide", with the tower of Combeinteignhead church gleaming through the hedgerow elms above it.

Writing at the beginning of the twentieth century, a local tourist guide stated "Coombe Cellars can also be approached by a delightful row up the river. But keep your eye on the tide. The inn makes a charming spot for afternoon tea, which can be enjoyed in the gardens, or indoors." Other tourist guides of Devon mention the inn, including Charles George Harper's The South Devon Coast, published in 1907. Earlier in its history, the romantic poet John Keats also wrote about the inn, mentioning enjoying cream spread on barley bread. At that time, the establishment was known as the Ferry Boat Inn, the word "cellars" referring to the fish cellars. These were huts in which fishermen who did not live on the coast could store their boats, nets and other fishing equipment. Some people had manorial obligations to provide fish to landowners while others were freeholders acting independently. Sea fishing was usually a part-time activity. The location has a long history, being an early base for the local fishing industry, when it had storage facilities. It was also used as a drop off point for smugglers.
