= Haccombe =

Hamlet and historic manor in Devon, England

Coordinates: 50°31′15″N 3°33′22″W

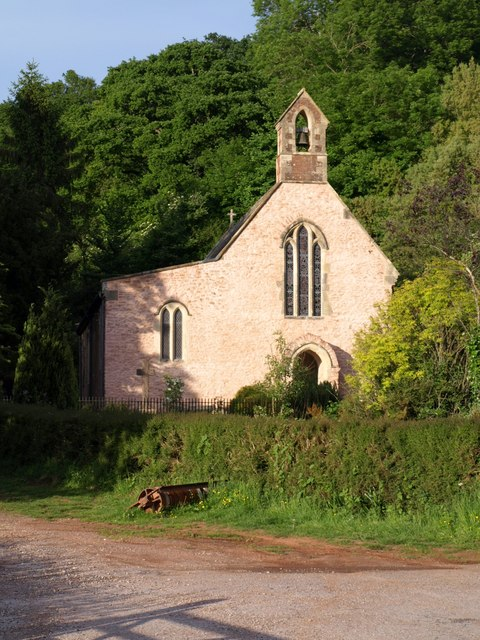
- St Blaise's Church

- Location within Devon
- Civil parish: Haccombe with Combe
- District: Teignbridge
- Shire county: Devon
- Region: South West
- Country: England
- Sovereign state: United Kingdom

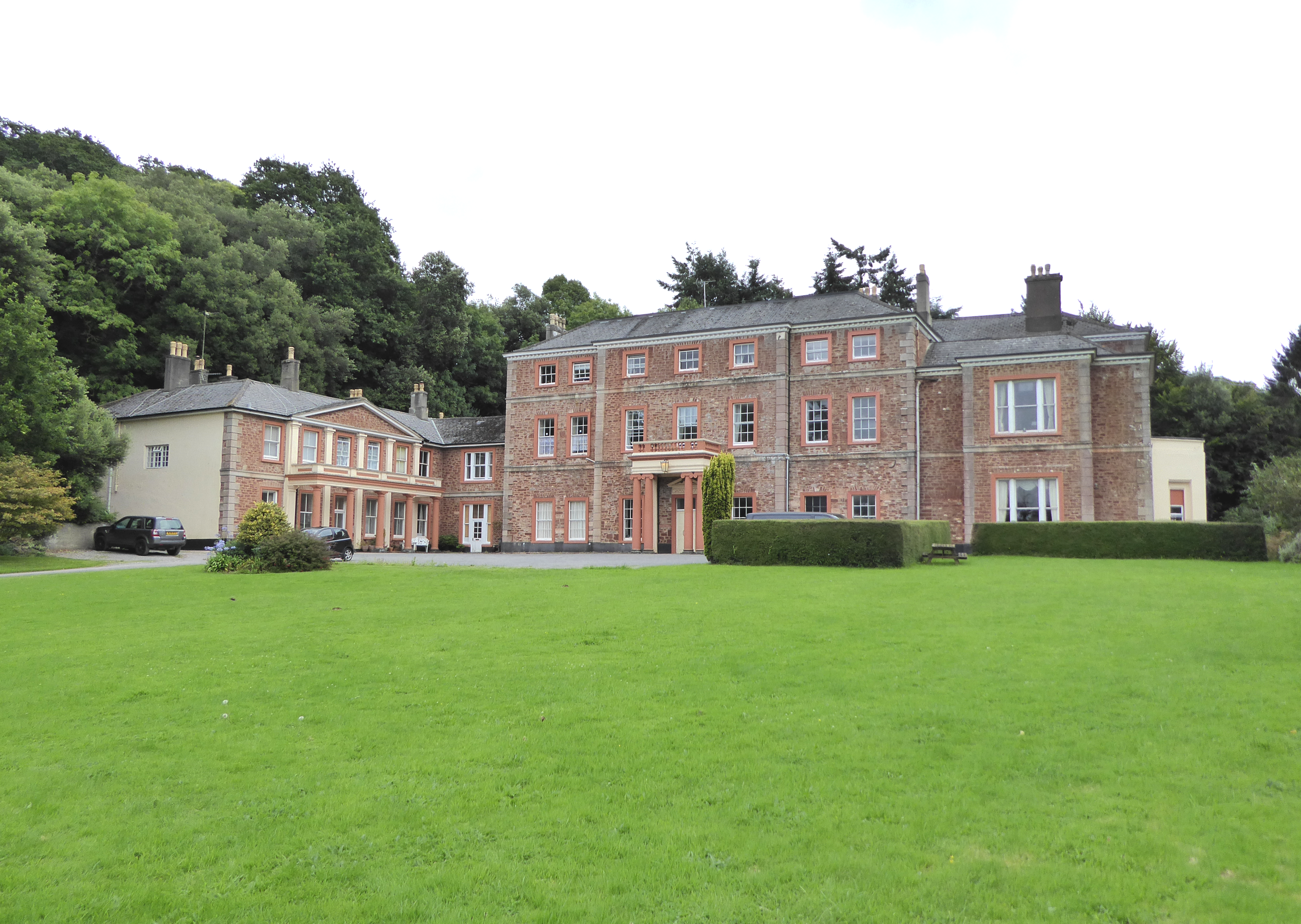
Haccombe House in 2017

Haccombe is a village and former civil parish and historic manor, now in the parish of Haccombe with Combe, in the Teignbridge district, in the county of Devon, England. It is situated 2 1/2 miles east of Newton Abbot, in the south of the county. It is possibly the smallest parish in England, and was said in 1810 to be remarkable for containing only two inhabited houses, namely the manor house known as Haccombe House and the parsonage. Haccombe House is a "nondescript Georgian structure" (Pevsner), rebuilt shortly before 1795 by the Carew family on the site of an important mediaeval manor house. In 1881 the parish had a population of 14. On 25 March 1885 the parish was abolished and merged with Combe in Teignhead and to form "Haccombe with Combe".

Next to the house is the small parish church dedicated to Saint Blaise, remarkable not only for the many ancient stone sculpted effigies and monumental brasses it contains, amongst the best in Devon, but also because the incumbent has the rare title of Archpriest and is accountable not to the local bishop (Bishop of Exeter), as are all other parish churches in Devon, but to the Archbishop of Canterbury. The archpresbytery was established in 1341 with six clergy; only the archpriest survived at the Reformation. The ecclesiastical parish is now combined with that of Stoke-in-Teignhead with Combe-in-Teignhead.

== Archpriest of Haccombe ==
- 1581-1594: John Woolton (1535?–1594), Bishop of Exeter, who "as the bishopric had become of small value, was allowed to hold with it the place of archpriest at Haccombe (20 Oct. 1581) and the rectory of Lezant in Cornwall (1584)".
- 1921-1934: William Keble Martin (1877–1969), botanist and botanical illustrator, known for his Concise British Flora in Colour (1965)

== Manor ==
The manor was the seat of important branches of the Courtenay and Carew families.

== Sources ==
- Cherry, Bridget & Pevsner, Nikolaus, The Buildings of England: Devon. Yale University Press, 2004. ISBN 978-0-300-09596-8
- Risdon, Tristram (died 1640), Survey of Devon. With considerable additions. London, 1811.
- Vivian, Lt.Col. J.L., (Ed.) The Visitations of the County of Devon: Comprising the Heralds' Visitations of 1531, 1564 & 1620. Exeter, 1895.
