= Milber Down =

Iron Age hill fort in Devon, England

Coordinates: 50.514°N 3.564°W

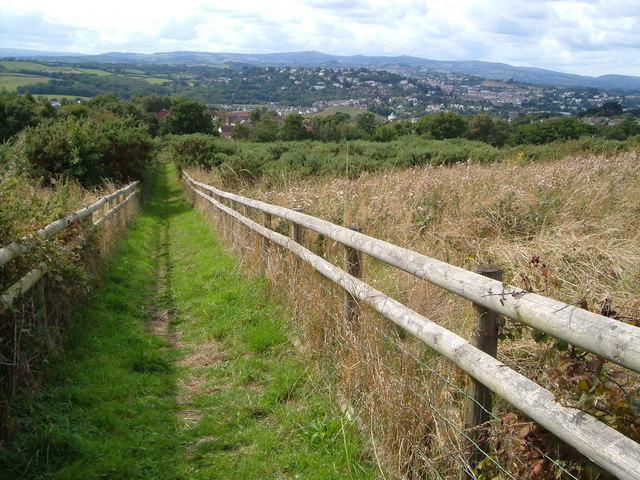
View from Milber Down

Milber Down is an Iron Age hill fort on the hill above the suburb of Milber, Newton Abbot in Devon, England. The fort is situated on the north-western slope of Milber Down at about 110 metres (360 ft) above sea level, and is bisected by the minor ridge road that leads to Barton, Torquay. One Iron Age artefact discovered there was a figurine of a stag.
