= A380 road =

Road in England

A380

Route information
- Length: 18 mi (29 km)

Major junctions
- North end: Exeter; 50.6515°N 3.5413°W
- A38 A381 A383 A3022 A385
- South end: Paignton; 50.4288°N 3.5890°W

Location
- Country: United Kingdom
- Primary destinations: Torquay

Road network
- Roads in the United Kingdom; Motorways; A and B road zones

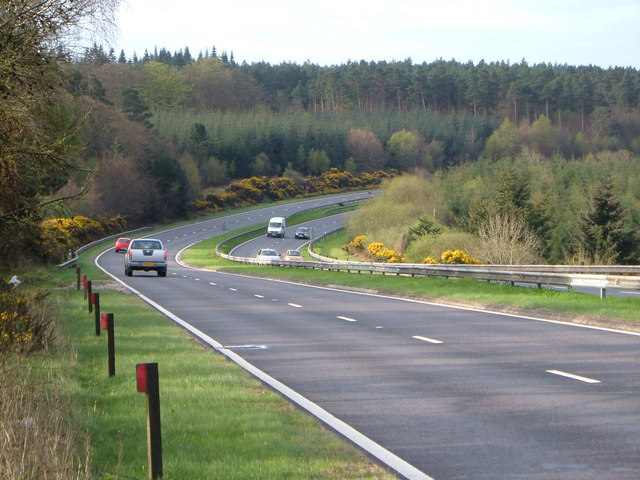
The A380 on the top of Haldon.

The A380 is a road in South West England, connecting the Torbay area to the Devon Expressway, and hence to the rest of Great Britain's main road network.

== Route ==
The A380 leaves the A38 at Kennford, some 3 miles (4.8 km) from that road's junction with the M5 motorway, and 6 miles (9.7 km) from the centre of the city of Exeter. It then proceeds in a generally southerly direction, climbing over the Haldon Hills, past junctions for Mamhead and Teignmouth, before descending past the towns of Kingsteignton and Newton Abbot and continuing on a flyover over the Penn Inn roundabout heading towards Torquay. Before the current road layout existed, the two carriageways used to split in the Haldon Hills with the Exeter bound carriageway taking a more northern route closer to Ugbrooke House.

Beyond Newton Abbot, the road bypasses the village of Kingskerswell on the South Devon Highway. The road soon comes to Edginswell (a signal controlled junction) at Torquay where it meets the A3022 that (as Dual carriageway) serves the large seaside resort of Torquay. The road then heads right up a hill towards Gallows Gate roundabout then Preston Down roundabout and then Churscombe Cross roundabout on the Paignton ring road where the road reduces to single carriageway and enters Paignton finally ending at Collaton St Mary 1 mile (1.6 km) inland from Paignton, where it meets the A3022 (again) and the A385 at Tweenaways Cross. Prior to the construction of the Kingkerswell bypass, the A380 passed through Kingkerswell (although the original route was along Fore Street) and into Torquay along the current A3022 terminating on the now declassified Union Street which was then the A379. Another branch ran past Torre Abbey to the sea front.

== Kingskerswell bypass ==
There have been plans to alleviate the traffic congestion on the stretch of the road between Newton Abbot and Torquay since 1951. Construction of a bypass around Kingskerswell was almost authorised by the Department for Transport, with construction to start in 2010 and completion in 2013, but in March 2009 it was suggested that with the economic recession there may not be sufficient money left for constructing a bypass, since money was awarded to other road building schemes elsewhere in the UK the previous autumn. A public enquiry was held in 2009. In October 2010 the government refused to fund the scheme, and placed it in a funding pool to compete against 33 other schemes nationwide for a £600 million development fund. However, in November 2011 the government awarded £74.6 million towards the cost of the bypass, with construction to start the following year. Construction began in October 2012 with the road completed and opened in December 2015. This new section of road is designated the South Devon Highway.

== Penn Inn Roundabout ==
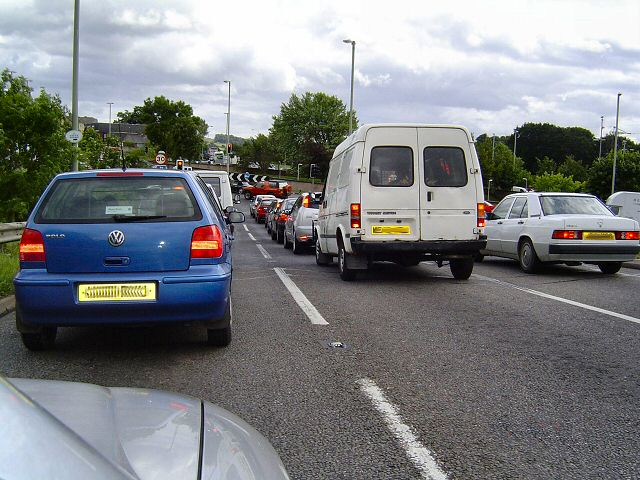
Penn Inn roundabout - northern approach

The Penn Inn Roundabout is a signal-controlled roundabout interchange at Newton Abbot where the A380 used to meet the A381 and an unclassified road at one of the busiest roundabouts in Devon. The A380 now continues over the roundabout on a flyover continuing to Exeter as part of the South Devon Highway (Traffic can still get to the roundabout off the dual carriageway using the other lane). This is to relieve congestion especially at peak times. There is a completely separate system of subways for pedestrians underneath the roundabout.

It is a junction which is noted for being subject to very high vehicle flows (in 2008, 73000 vehicles per day entered the roundabout) and as a result can be subject to long queues at peak times. Various upgrades have been made to the junction since its construction in an effort to increase capacity; it now has four lanes on the A381 approach and northern section of the roundabout. The Kingskerswell bypass completed in December 2015 has a single carriageway flyover north–south so that through traffic on the A380 dual carriageway does not have to negotiate the junction.

The junction takes its name from the similarly named adjacent Penn Inn pub which in May 2015 was acquired by Mitchells & Butlers and rebranded as Toby Carvery.

== See also ==
- A roads in Zone 3 of the Great Britain numbering scheme
