= Torbay and South Devon =

- Proposed unitary authority area
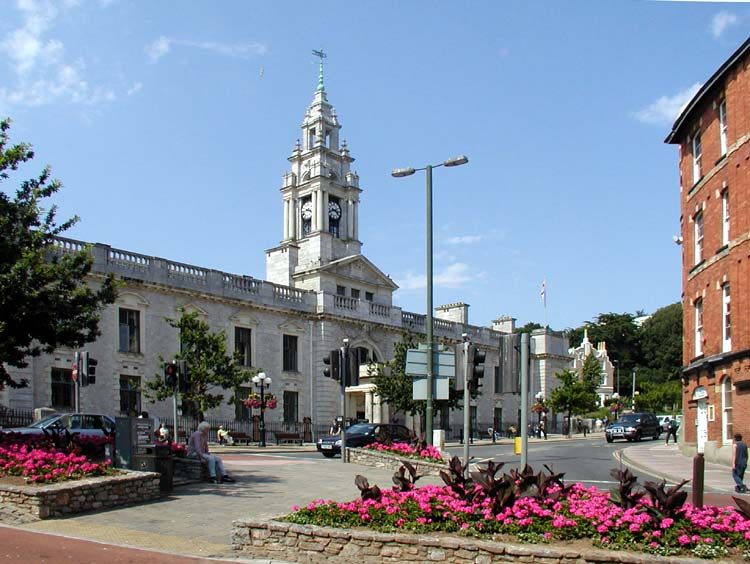
- Torquay

- Shown within the ceremonial county of Devon
- Interactive map
- Coordinates: 50.4688°N 3.5319°W
- Sovereign state: United Kingdom
- Country: England
- Region: South West
- Ceremonial county: Devon

Government
  - Type: Unitary authority
  - Body: Torbay and South Devon Council

Population (2024 estimate)
  - Total: 222,822
- Time zone: UTC+0 (GMT)
  - Summer (DST): UTC+1 (BST)

Torbay and South Devon or Torbay was a proposed unitary authority area in the ceremonial county of Devon, England. It was planned to be formed on 1 April 2028, with shadow elections planned to take place in May 2027. The largest settlement would have been Torquay. Plans to create it were halted in September 2026 and the first election was cancelled. In October 2026, the plans to create it were withdrawn.

== Formation ==
It will have been formed from the existing unitary authority area of Torbay, 16 parishes from Teignbridge and five parishes from South Hams two-tier districts. The area has a population of approximately 232,000. Plans to create it were halted in September 2026 and the 2027 election was cancelled.

The district was being formed as part of ongoing local government changes throughout England, in which all areas of the country that have separate county councils and district councils will see those replaced with single-tier, or unitary, local governance. The rest of Devon would have formed the Greater Plymouth, Exeter and Devon council areas. The alternative proposal for four unitaries and three proposals for three unitaries were not accepted.

In September 2026, the Devon proposals were halted by the government and placed under review. In September 2026, the Devon proposals were halted by the government and placed under review. In October 2026, plans to create it were withdrawn. Devon County Council initiated a judicial review of the decision.

== Governance ==
It would have been run by Torbay and South Devon Council, which would have comprised 64 councillors.

== Parishes ==
Torbay apart from Brixham is currently unparished, the rest of the area is parished. The parishes coming from the two-tier districts would have been: Abbotskerswell, Berry Pomeroy, Bishopsteignton, Broadhempston, Coffinswell, Denbury and Torbryan, Haccombe with Combe, Ideford, Ipplepen, Kingskerswell, Kingsteignton, Kingswear, Littlehempston, Marldon, Newton Abbot, Ogwell, Shaldon, Stoke Gabriel, Stokeinteignhead, Teigngrace and Teignmouth.
