= Exeter (unitary authority area) =

- Proposed unitary authority area
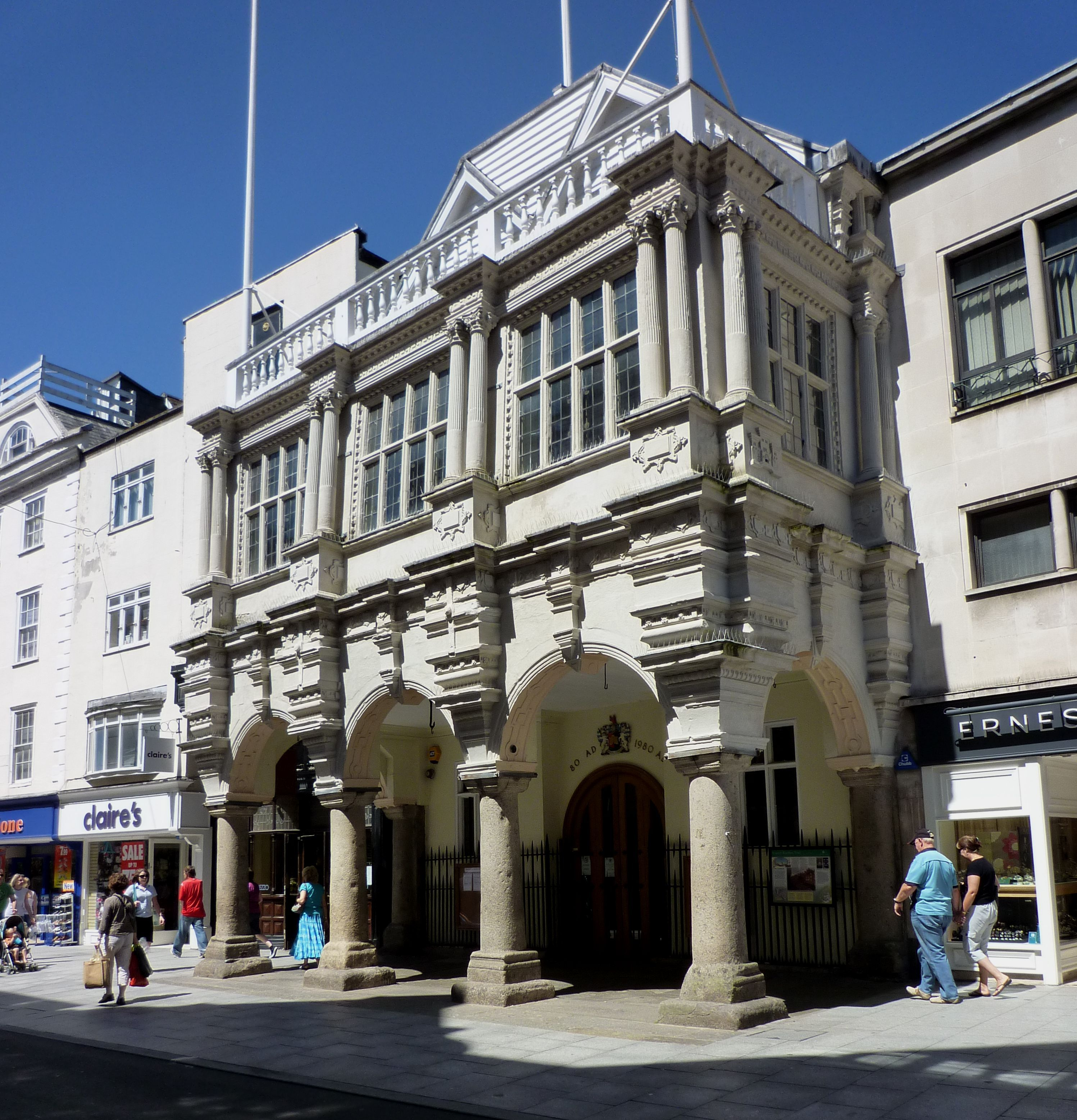
- Exeter

- Shown within the ceremonial county of Devon
- Interactive map
- Coordinates: 50.7234°N 3.5318°W
- Sovereign state: United Kingdom
- Country: England
- Region: South West
- Ceremonial county: Devon

Government
  - Type: Unitary authority
  - Body: Exeter Council

Population (2024 estimate)
  - Total: 264,574
- Time zone: UTC+0 (GMT)
  - Summer (DST): UTC+1 (BST)

Exeter was a proposed unitary authority area in the ceremonial county of Devon, England. It was planned to be formed on 1 April 2028, with shadow elections planned to take place in May 2027. The largest settlement would be Exeter, but it was also planned to cover Exmouth and the small towns of Dawlish, Crediton, Chudleigh and Budleigh Salterton as well as numerous small villages. It was to be formed from the existing Exeter district, 15 parishes from Teignbridge, 28 from East Devon and six parishes from Mid Devon. The area has a population of approximately 260,000. The local authority for the district was to be Exeter Council, which would have 86 councillors.

The district is being formed as part of ongoing local government changes throughout England, in which all areas of the country that have separate county councils and district councils will see those replaced with single-tier, or unitary, local governance. The rest of Devon was to form the Greater Plymouth, Torbay and South Devon and Devon council areas. The alternative proposal for four unitaries and three proposals for three unitaries were not accepted.

In September 2026, the Devon proposals were halted by the government and placed under review. The 2027 election was cancelled. In October 2026, plans to create it were withdrawn. The decision was threatened with judicial review by Devon County Council.

== Parishes ==
Exeter is currently unparished, the rest of the area is parished. The parishes in the area area:

- Ashcombe, Aylesbeare
- Bicton, Brampford Speke, Broadclyst, Budleigh Salterton
- Cheriton Bishop, Chudleigh, Clyst Honiton, Clyst Hydon, Clyst St. Lawrence, Clyst St. George, Clyst St. Mary, Colaton Raleigh, Colebrooke, Cranbrook, Crediton, Crediton Hamlets
- Dawlish, Dunchideock
- East Budleigh, Exminster, Exmouth
- Farringdon
- Hittisleigh, Holcombe Burnell, Huxham
- Ide
- Kenn, Kenton
- Lympstone
- Mamhead
- Netherexe, Newton St. Cyres
- Otterton,
- Poltimore, Powderham
- Rewe, Rockbeare
- Shillingford St. George, Sowton, Starcross, Stoke Canon
- Tedburn St. Mary
- Upton Pyne
- West Hill, Whimple, Whitestone and Woodbury
