= Torbryan =

Village in Devon, England

Coordinates: 50.489°N 3.663°W

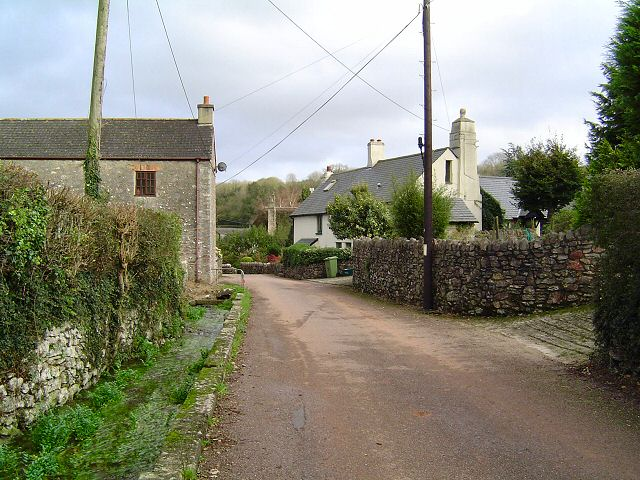
- Torbryan High Street

- Location within Devon
- OS grid reference: SX 8206 6683
- Civil parish: Denbury and Torbryan
- District: Teignbridge
- Shire county: Devon
- Region: South West
- Country: England
- Sovereign state: United Kingdom
- Post town: Newton Abbot
- Postcode district: TQ12
- Dialling code: 01803
- Police: Devon and Cornwall
- Fire: Devon and Somerset
- Ambulance: South Western
- UK Parliament: Newton Abbot
- Website: https://www.teignbridge.gov.uk/

Torbryan is a village and former civil parish, now in the parish of Denbury and Torbryan, in the Teignbridge district, in the county of Devon, England. It is located approximately one mile to the west of Ipplepen.

== History ==
In the Domesday Book (1086) it was listed simply as "Torre", from Old English torr meaning hill. The manor came to be held for over 250 years by the de Brianne or Brionne (Bryan/Brian) family, who probably originated in Brionne in Normandy. The manor is first recorded as Torre Briane in 1238. In 1242 it was held by Sir Wydo [Guy] de Brianne or Brionne. On 25 March 1885 the parish of Denbury was merged with Torbryan. On 1 April 1998, the new parish was renamed to "Denbury & Torbryan". In 1881 the civil parish of Torbryan (prior to the merge) had a population of 203.

== Church ==
Holy Trinity Church is situated at the head of the village. It is thought that the original church built by Sir Guy de Bryan burnt down in about 1360. The present church was constructed in 1400. The church currently houses a colony of lesser horseshoe bats.

The church houses a medieval rood screen constructed in about 1430, the lower panels having a unique series of coloured paintings depicting 36 saints. The screen is a rare survivor of the reformation and survived because the panels were whitewashed. These screens made national headlines when they were stolen in 2013 but later recovered by the police, restored and reinstalled.

== Caves ==
The Torbryan caves located in the valley were largely excavated by Edward Widger who lived in the village. The bones of many extinct animals were found in the excavations including those of the mammoth, cave hyena and cave bear. These remains are displayed at the Natural History Museum, London.

== Notable inhabitants ==
- Sir William Petre, born at Tor Newton. He was a Tudor Secretary of State and agent of Thomas Cromwell. He served from Henry VIII to Elizabeth I. There is a monument to him on the north wall of the chancel.
