= South West Regional Coastal Monitoring Programme =

Coordinates: 50°22′30″N 4°08′27″W

South West Coastal Monitoring
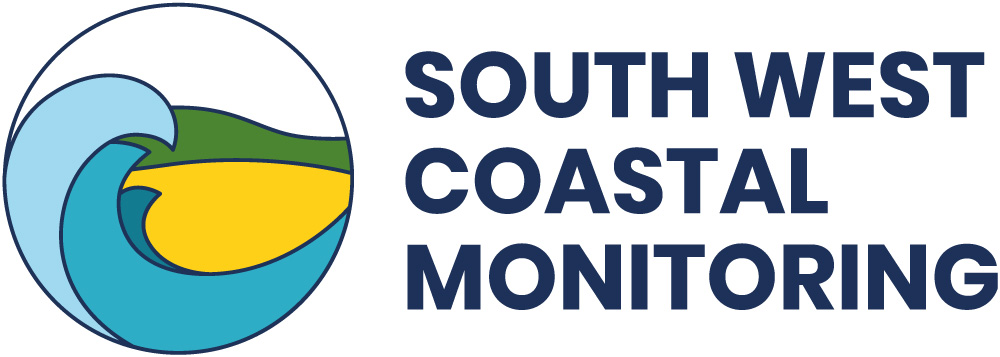
- Website: southwest.coastalmonitoring.orgwww.coastalmonitoring.org/southwest

The South West Regional Coastal Monitoring Programme, formerly known as Plymouth Coastal Observatory (PCO) is one of seven regional programmes in a national network which collectively monitor the coast of England and Wales. It is managed and led by Teignbridge District Council in partnership with other south west of England local authorities and the Environment Agency.

The programme monitors over 2,450 km of coast between Portland Bill in Dorset and Beachley Point on the border with Wales. The focus of the ongoing programme is collecting data on waves, tides, LiDAR, Aerial Photography, topographic beach surveys, storm response and ecological mapping. Data is published through its website, and is freely available for public use.

== Location ==
South West Coastal Monitoring has an office situated on the Campus of University of Plymouth, located in the city centre of Plymouth, England. The contract and programme management runs from the Teignbridge District Council offices based at Forde House, in Newton Abbot, Devon.

== History ==
The first phase of the programme was set up in 2006, with an initial grant of £7.2 million from the Department for Environment, Food and Rural Affairs (DEFRA). The funding was split into two with £4.1 million used by Teignbridge to deliver, Bathymetric and Topographic, Hydrographic surveys and £3.1 million managed by the Environment Agency to deliver Aerial photography, LiDAR and Ecological mapping. Phase 2 of the programme commenced in 2011 with 100% DEFRA funding, and ran until 2016. Phase 2 of the Programme was solely managed by Teignbridge District Council. Phase 3 of the programme started in March 2016 and ran until 2021. Phase 4 of the programme started in 2021 and is funded by DEFRA until 2027. Phase 5 is expected to be funded from 2027.

== Assets ==
The programme has a network of wave buoys around the south west coastline collecting data on wave height, direction and sea temperature. In July 2014 the programmes wave buoys recorded the highest sea temperatures seen for 7 years around the south west coastline. In 2011 the buoy network also detected a 0.5–0.8m tsunami along south west coast of England.

The programme has 13 wave buoys, 9 meteorological stations and 4 tide gauges situated around the south west coast, collecting real time wave, met, tidal and surge data. A notable addition to the tidal gauge network was the Port Isaac Step gauge, which was installed in 2010. The installation at Port Isaac filled a 'notable gap in measured tide data along the north Cornwall coastline'

== Research and collaboration ==
After the 2013/2014 winter storms Natural Environment Research Council (NERC) awarded a £50,000 emergency project grant to coastal researchers at the University of Plymouth in conjunction with PCO and the Met Office. The project ran from 1 March 2014 for 1 year and assessed the coastal response to the extreme winter storms. Collaboration between South West Coastal Monitoring and the University of Plymouth Coastal Process Research Group (CPRG) is ongoing.

Data collected and provided by the South West Coastal Monitoring is used by local authority coastal engineers and planners to inform decisions on coastal policy, defence and maintenance.

The programme also supports education and helped produce resource packs for KS3 and KS2 with Geography South West

== Future development ==
The programme currently employs 11 members of staff. It has close links with the Channel Coastal Observatory, and academics at University of Plymouth. Phase 5 of the programme is expected to commence from 2027 pending further DEFRA funding.
