= Kennford =

Village in Devon, England

Coordinates: 50°40′00″N 3°32′08″W

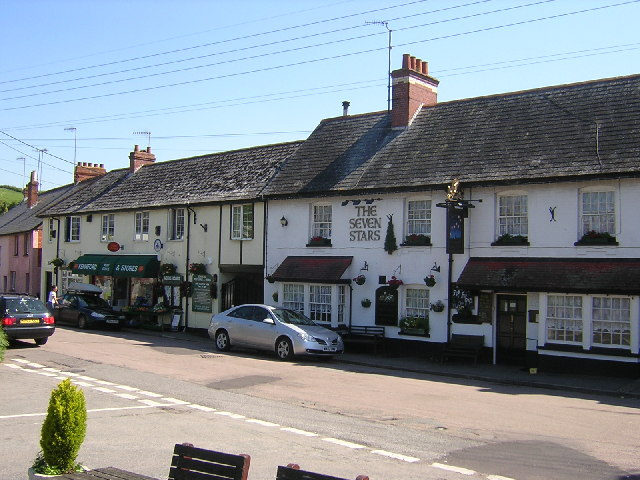
- Shops in Kennford

- Location within Devon
- OS grid reference: SX9186
  - London: 159 miles (256 km)
- Civil parish: Kenn
- District: Teignbridge
- Shire county: Devon
- Region: South West
- Country: England
- Sovereign state: United Kingdom
- Post town: EXETER
- Postcode district: EX6
- Dialling code: 01392
- Police: Devon and Cornwall
- Fire: Devon and Somerset
- Ambulance: South Western
- UK Parliament: Central Devon

Kennford is a village situated in the Teignbridge district of Devon, England. Kennford is four miles (6 km) to the south of Exeter in the civil parish of Kenn; it is situated in one of the country's main tourist areas. At the 2021 census, the village had a population of 537.

== Road ==
The village became prominent in the 1970s as the location of a new service station on the A38 Devon Expressway between Exeter and Plymouth, near the southern terminus of the then new M5 motorway. This service area is a popular stopping place for tourists on their way to South Devon and Cornwall.

== Holiday parks ==
Close to the village is a caravan and camping park.

== Notable people ==
The entertainer Danny La Rue was brought up in Kennford from the age of 6.
