= Holy Trinity Church, Torbryan =

Church in Torbryan, Devon, England

Holy Trinity Church
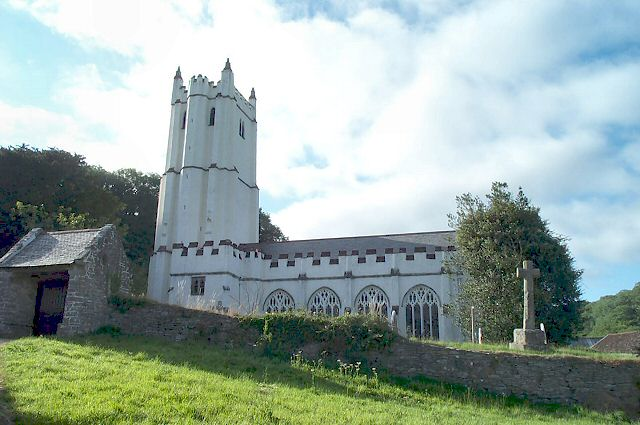

- Location within Devon
- 50°29′22″N 3°39′54″W
- Location: Torbryan, Devon, England

History
- Built: 1470

Listed Building – Grade I
- Official name: Church of the Holy Trinity
- Designated: 23 August 1955
- Reference no.: 1249658

Holy Trinity Church in Torbryan, near Ipplepen in Devon, England, was built in the 15th century. It is recorded in the National Heritage List for England as a designated Grade I listed building, and is now a redundant church in the care of the Churches Conservation Trust. It was vested in the Trust on 1 July 1987.

The church was built between 1450 and 1470. It has a Perpendicular three-stage tower with an octagonal stair turret on the south wall. The vestry was added in the 19th century.

The interior includes a medieval carved rood-screen, with panels showing paintings of saints and stained glass from the same period. In 2013 thieves removed two panels depicting Saint Victor of Marseilles and Saint Margaret of Antioch and damaged a third. The trust believed that the panels may have been stolen for sale abroad. The panels were later recovered by the Metropolitan Police Art and Antiques Unit and were restored and reinstalled.

== See also ==
- List of churches preserved by the Churches Conservation Trust in South West England
