= Luton, Teignbridge =

Village in Devon, England

Coordinates: 50.581424°N 3.552122°W

Luton
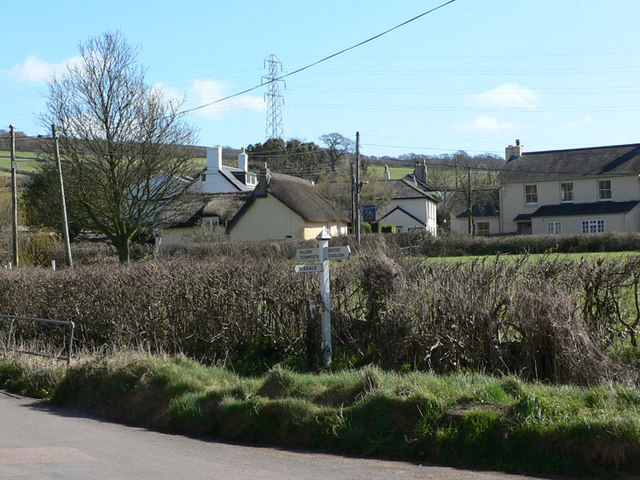
- Luton

- Location within Devon
- Civil parish: Bishopsteignton
- District: Teignbridge
- Ceremonial county: Devon
- Region: South West
- Country: England
- Sovereign state: United Kingdom
- Post town: TORQUAY
- Postcode district: TQ13
- Dialling code: 01626
- Police: Devon and Cornwall
- Fire: Devon and Somerset
- Ambulance: South Western
- UK Parliament: Teignbridge

Luton is a village in Devon, England, within Teignbridge local authority area. Historically Luton formed part of Ashcombe Hundred.

The village is in the parish of Bishopsteignton, but has a chapel of ease, dedicated to St John the Evangelist, built in the 19th century. The village is within Kenn Deanery for ecclesiastical purposes.

The chapel is a Grade II listed building, as are the lych gate and a tomb in the churchyard. Other listed buildings in the village include the Old Mill, a former watermill inoperative since the 1880s and now a private house, and Ivy Cottage, a 17th- or 18th-century thatched cottage.

The village contains a public house, the Elizabethan Inn.
