= Denbury Hill =

Iron Age hill fort in Devon, England

Coordinates: 50°30′N 3°39′W

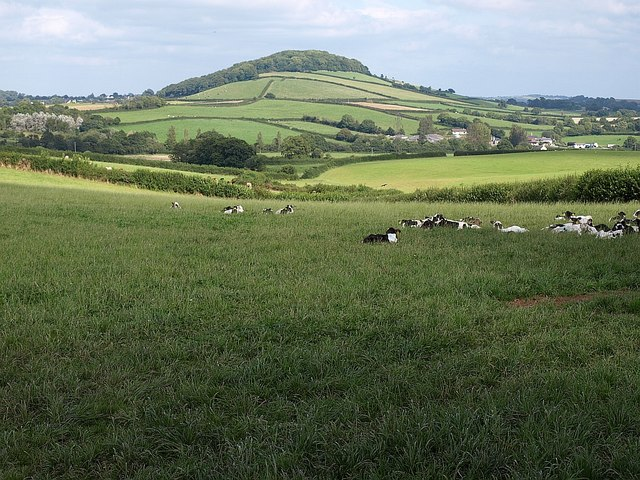
A distant view of Denbury Hill

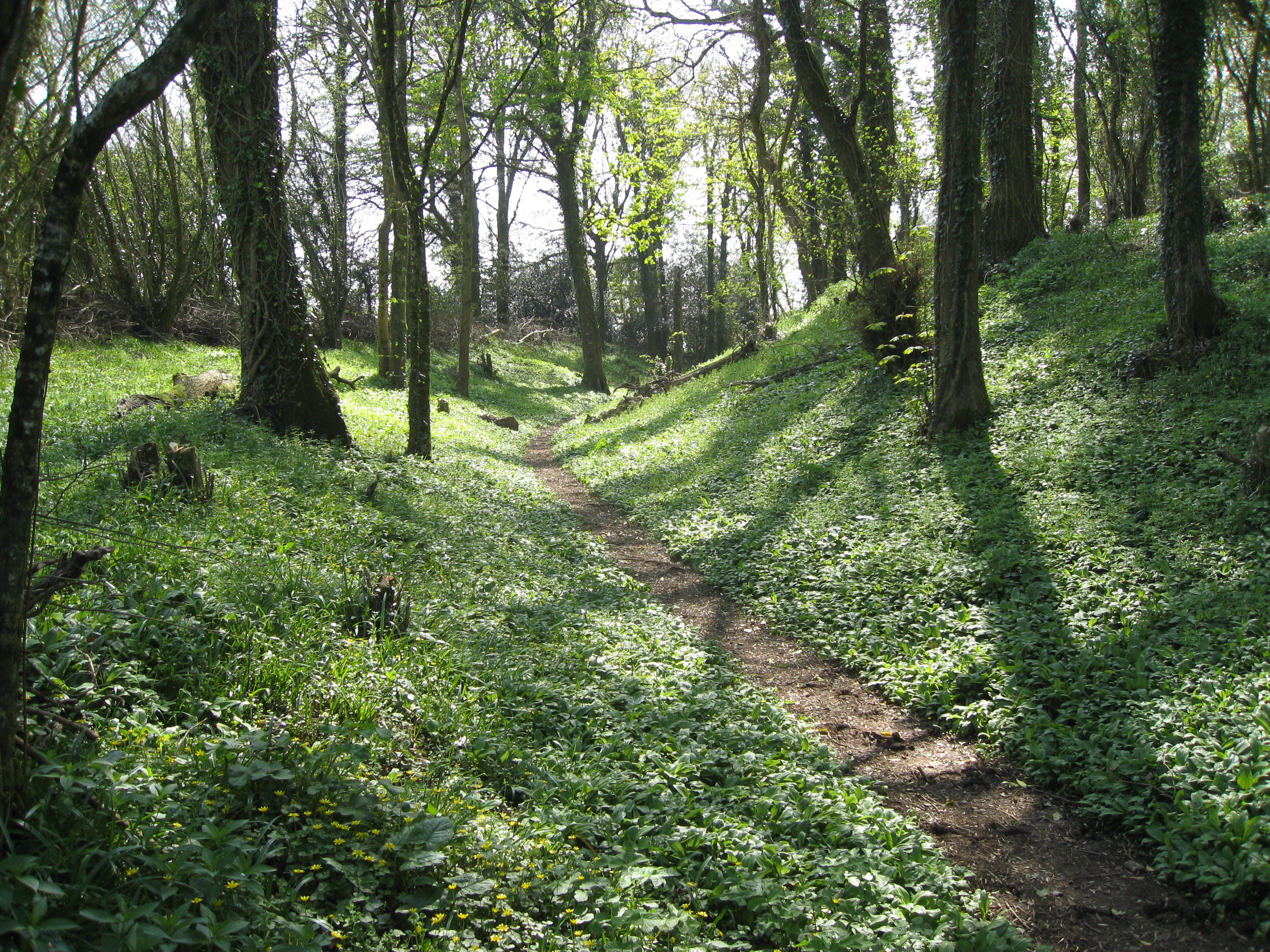
Earthworks on Denbury Hill

Denbury Hill (also known as Denbury Camp and Denbury Down) is the name of an Iron Age hill fort near the village of Denbury in Devon, England.

The fort is less than a kilometre south west of the village, occupying the entire hilltop of Denbury Down at 160 metres above sea level. It is surrounded on the south and east sides by high embankments. In the centre of the enclosure there are two large burial mounds. (Note: The camp was described in The Victoria County History of Devon (1906) as follows: "The entrenchments encircling the crown of this lofty igneous rock enclose 9 acres 1 rood and 1 perch, and consist of an elliptical camp with an outer court on the west side. On the north a steep natural escarpment dispenses with the need for artificial works, and a low rampart only is found. On the south and east, however, the defences are very strong; the south, the most easy for assault, is provided with a fosse nearly 45 ft. on the slope of the escarpment, and 30 ft. perpendicular measurement, which is gradually reduced in depth as it approaches the courtyard. The entrance at the north-east corner is on the verge of the steep decline, and the southern side of it alone demanded the skill of the engineers. Here the outer vallum widens into a platform 160 ft. in length and 14 ft. above the ground level, while the inner vallum returns at a right angle into the camp. Between the two ramparts the fosse forms a sunken road through which the defenders could pour their reserves from the court on to the enemy at the gate, or pass their cattle without taking them through the camp. At the middle of the west side is an entrance between the camp and the court where the agger on either side slightly incurves. Within the central area are two large tumuli, or mounds.")

The name Denbury means burh of the men of Devon, and the hill fort was probably re-occupied some time after the Romans left England and before the Norman conquest: it may have been used by the British as a centre of resistance against the Saxons, or it may have been occupied by the Saxons themselves. We do not know which because it has not been excavated.

According to legend, in common with similar locations (Note: For instance Cadbury Castle and Dolbury.) a great deal of gold is buried beneath the site. Theo Brown cited this couplet:

Whoever delves in Denbury Down
Is sure to find a golden crown.

And this one was mentioned by William Crossing in 1911:

If Denbury Down the level were,
England might plough with golden share.

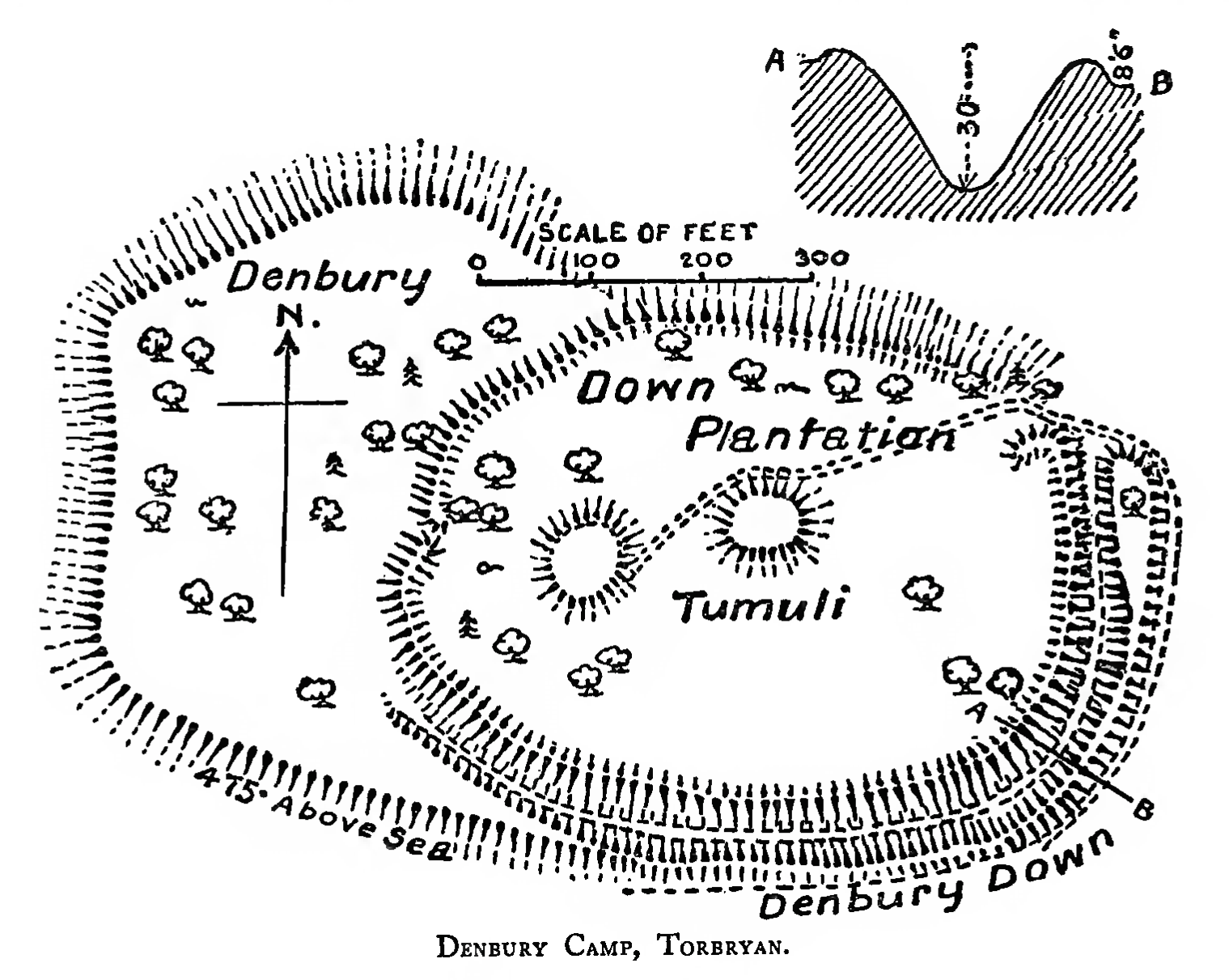
Plan of Denbury Camp from Victoria County History of Devon, 1906.

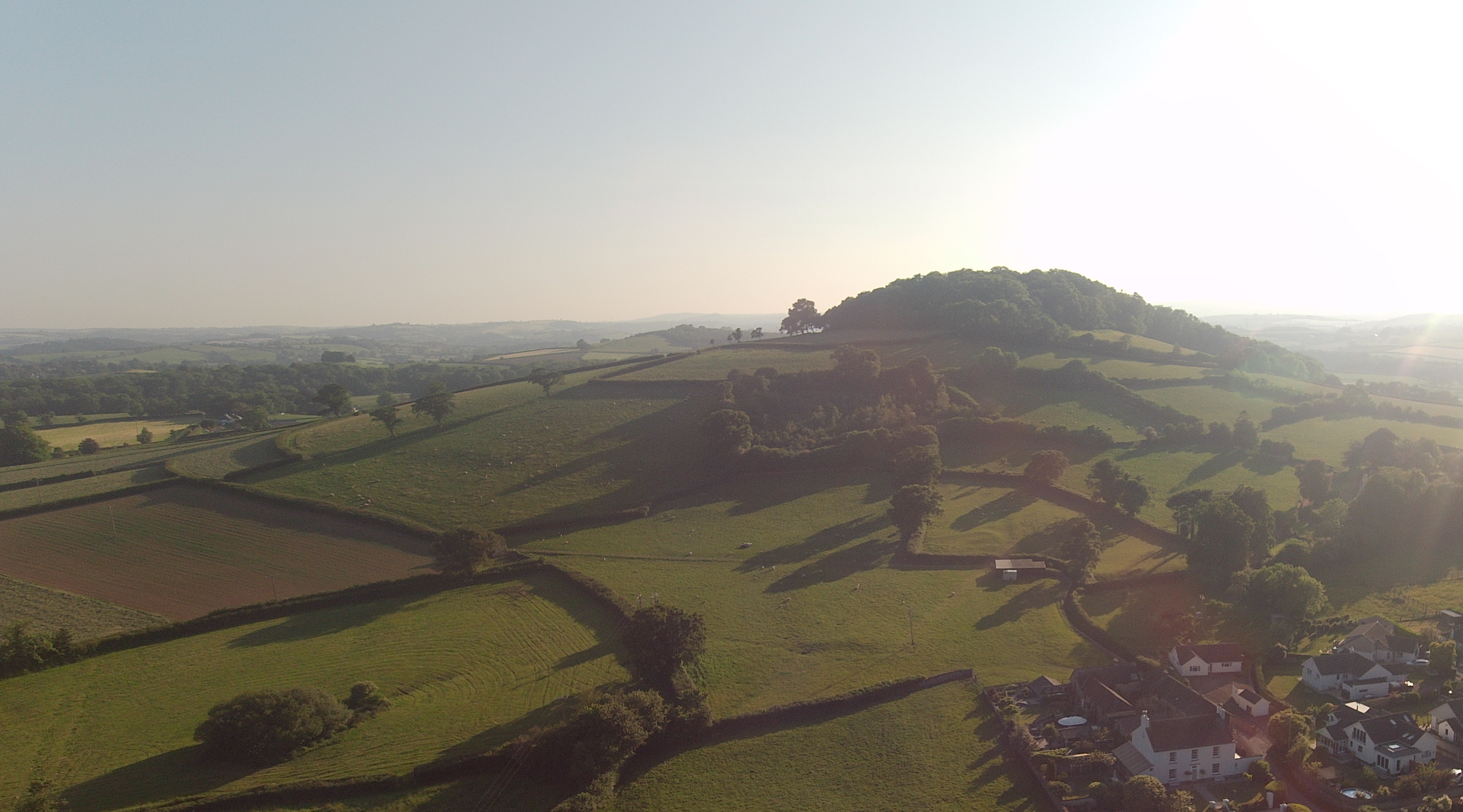
An aerial view of Denbury Hillfort in Devon, England.

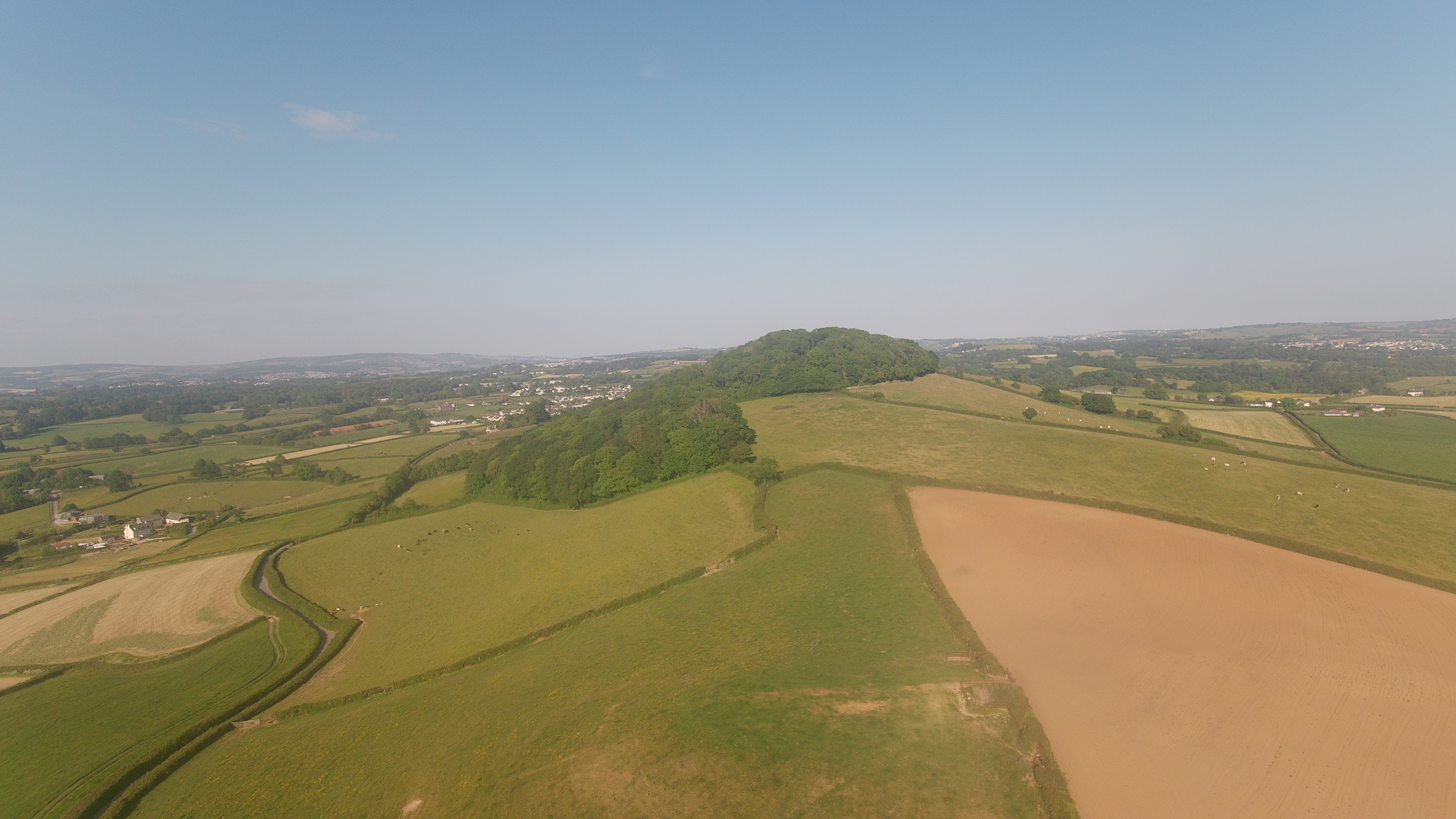
East-facing aerial view of Denbury Down in Devon, England.
