= Greater Plymouth =

- Proposed unitary authority area
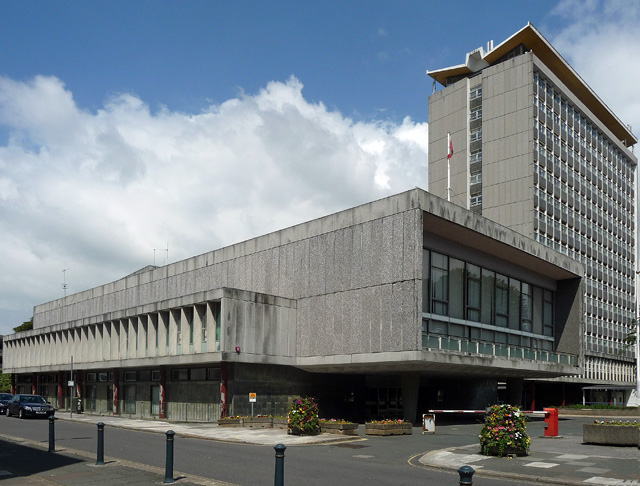
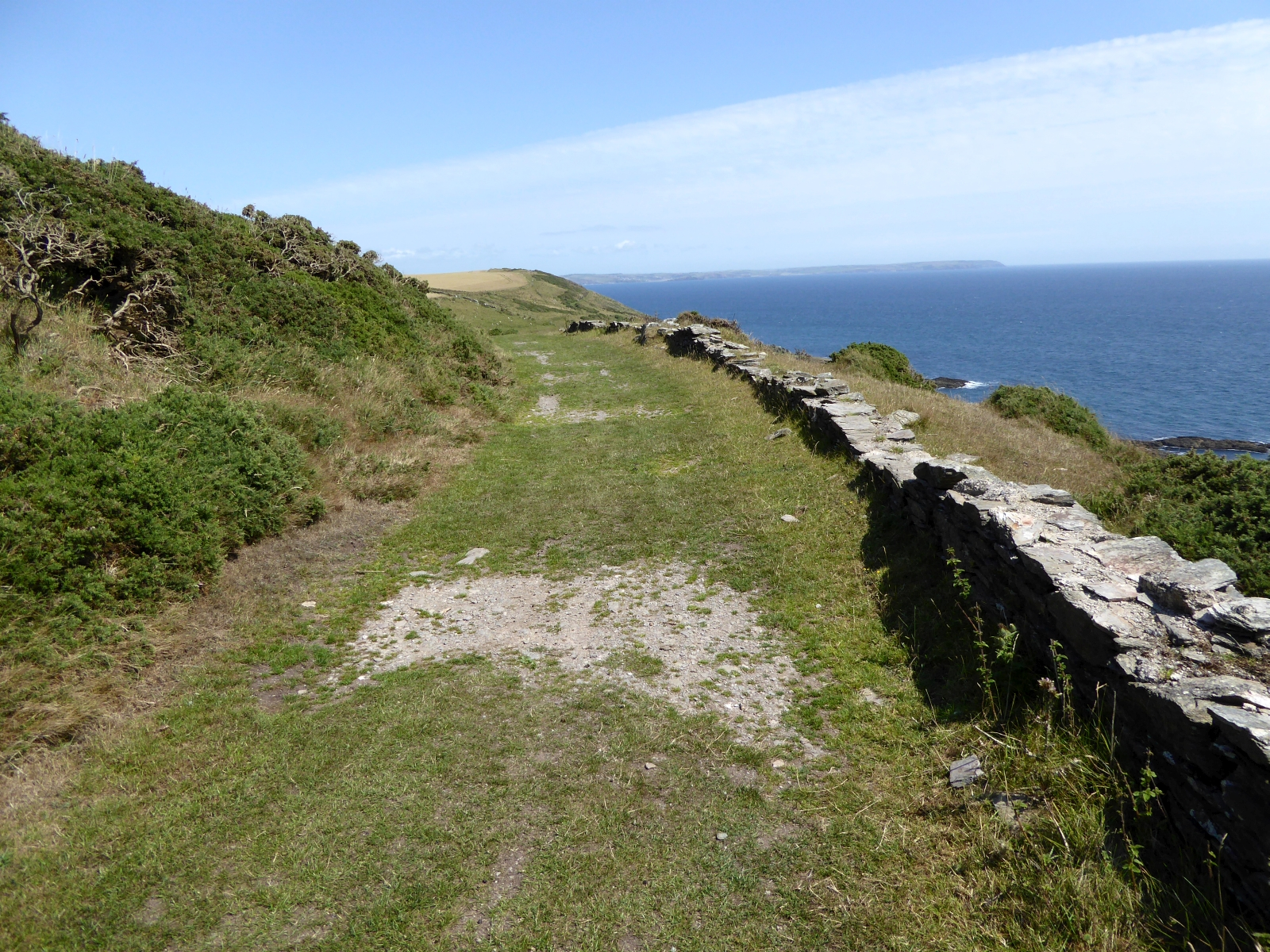
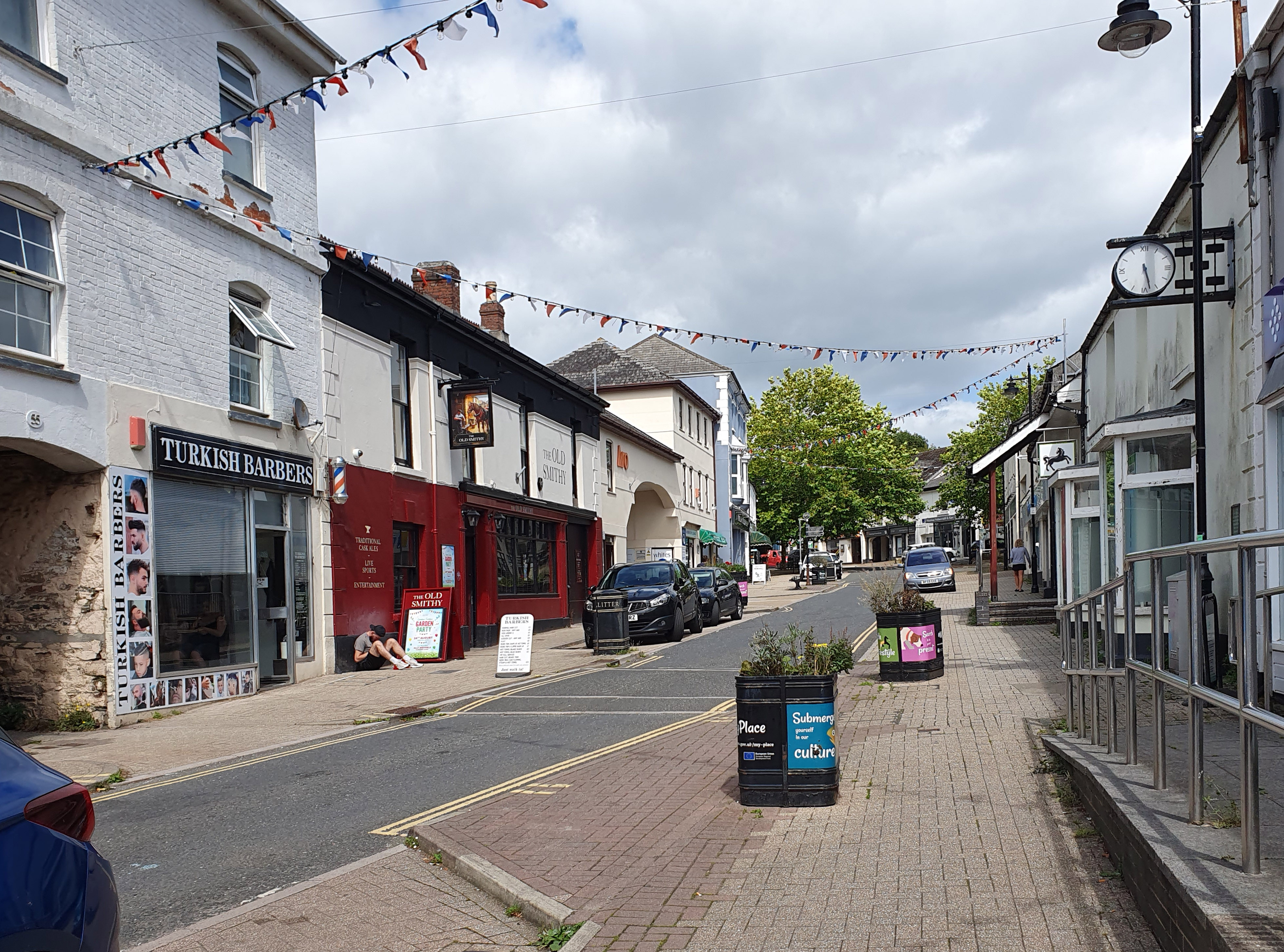
- Plymouth Council House South West Coast Path Ivybridge town centre

- Shown within the ceremonial county of Devon
- Interactive map
- Coordinates: 50.3700°N 4.1420°W
- Sovereign state: United Kingdom
- Country: England
- Region: South West
- Ceremonial county: Devon

Government
  - Type: Unitary authority
  - Body: Greater Plymouth Council

Population (2024 estimate)
  - Total: 307,315
- Time zone: UTC+0 (GMT)
  - Summer (DST): UTC+1 (BST)

Greater Plymouth or Plymouth was a proposed unitary authority area in the ceremonial county of Devon, England. It was planned to be formed on 1 April 2028, with shadow elections planned to take place in May 2027. The largest settlement was to be Plymouth. The area has a population of approximately 305,000. Plans to create it were halted in September 2026 and the first election was cancelled. In October 2026, plans to create it were withdrawn.

== Formation ==
It would have been formed from the existing unitary authority area of Plymouth and 13 parishes from the two-tier district of South Hams.

The district is being formed as part of ongoing local government changes throughout England, in which all areas of the country that have separate county councils and district councils will see those replaced with single-tier, or unitary, local governance. The rest of Devon would have formed the Torbay and South Devon, Exeter and Devon council areas. The alternative proposal for four unitaries and three proposals for three unitaries (one of which, backed by Devon County Council, would have seen the both existing unitaries remain unchanged while the rest of Devon became a single unitary) were not accepted.

In September 2026, the Devon proposals were halted by the government and placed under review. The 2027 election was cancelled. In October 2026, plans to create it were withdrawn. The decision was threatened with judicial review by Devon County Council.

== Governance ==
It would have been run by Greater Plymouth Council, which would comprise 68 councillors.

== Parishes ==
The Plymouth urban area (comprising the former county borough) is currently unparished; the rest of the area is parished. The parishes in the district would have been Bickleigh, Brixton, Ermington, Devon, Harford, Cornwood, Holbeton, Ivybridge, Newton and Noss, Shaugh Prior, Sparkwell, Ugborough, Wembury and Yealmpton.
