= Devon (district) =

- Proposed unitary authority area
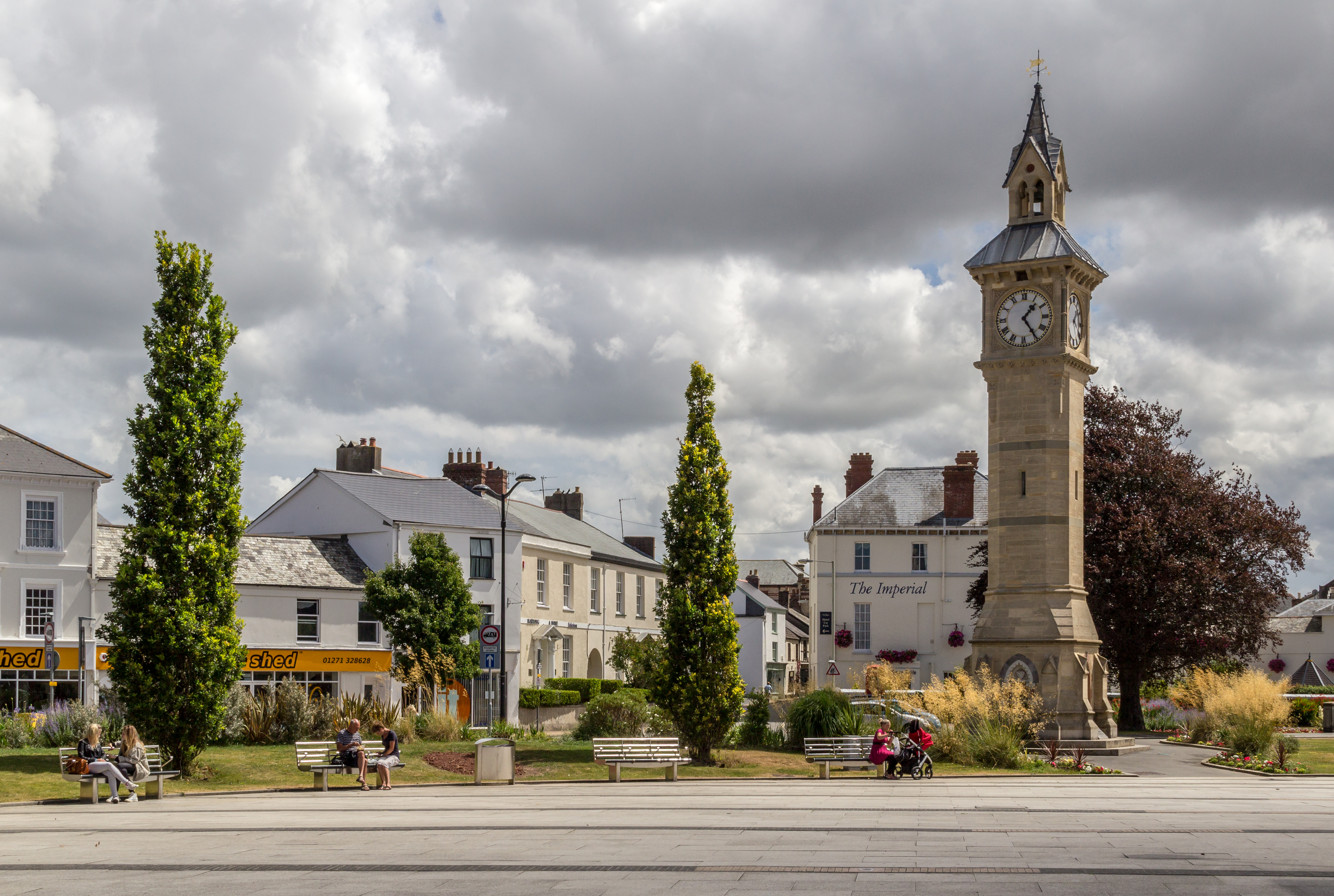
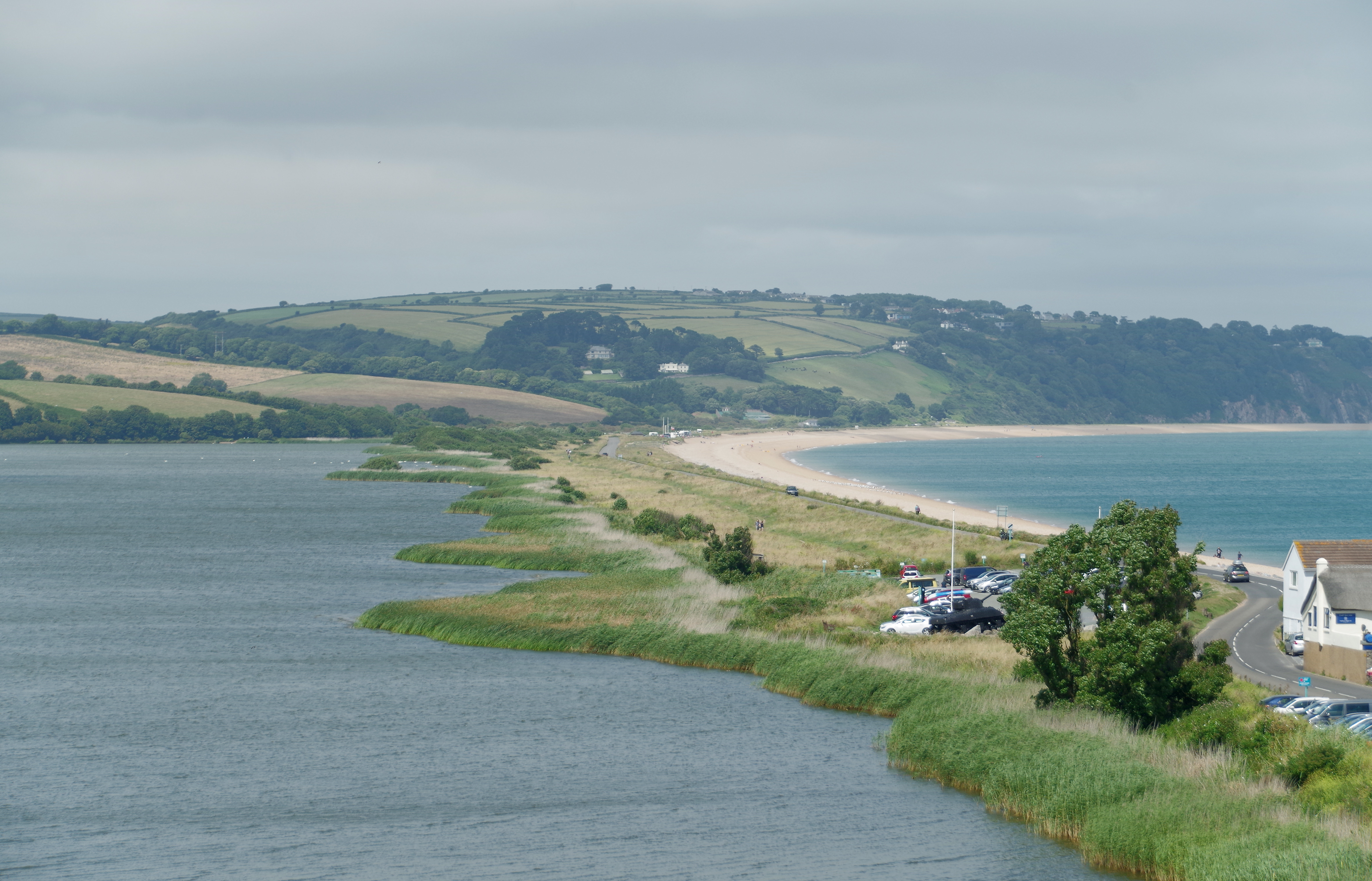
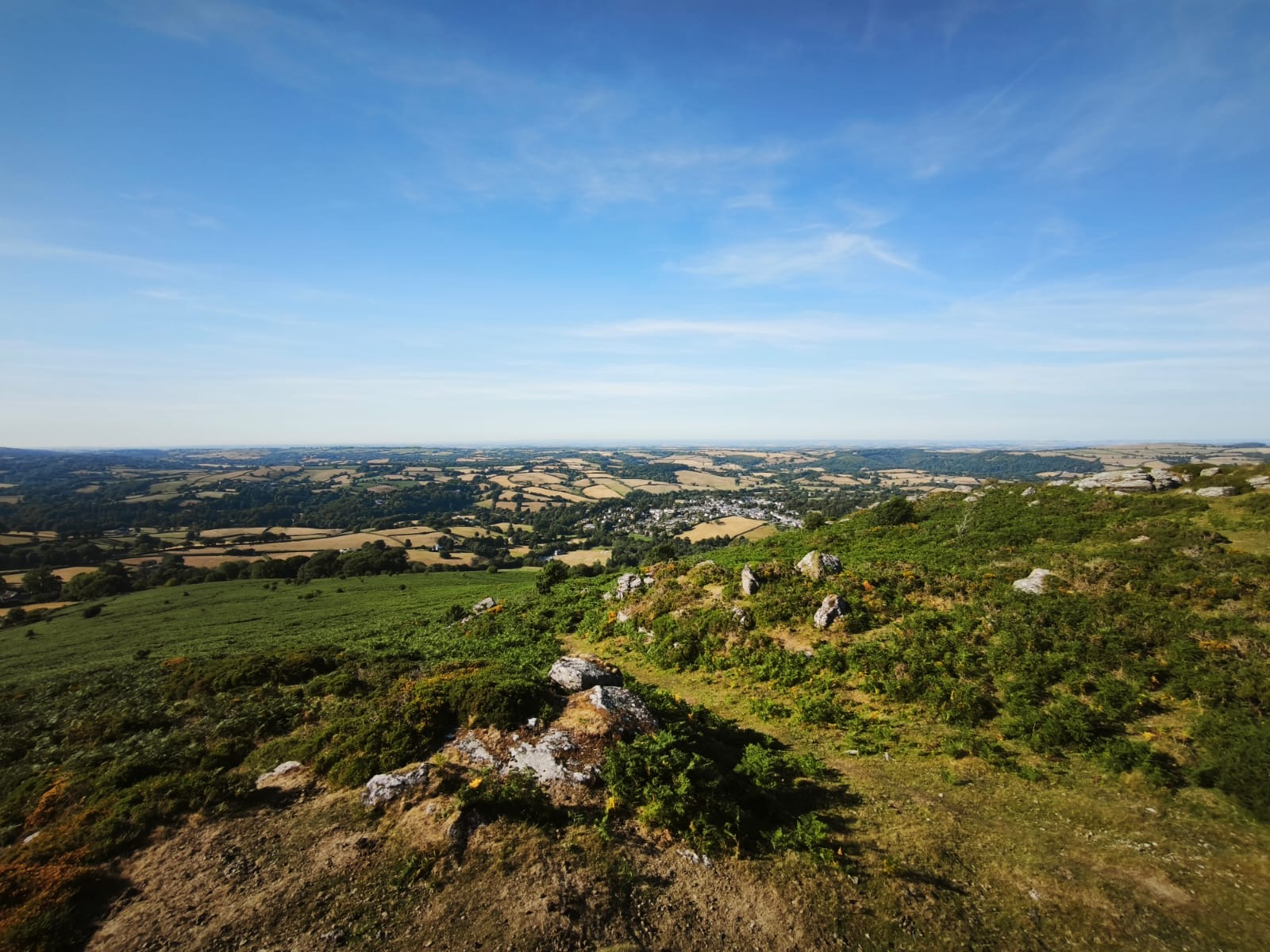
- Barnstaple Slapton Ley Dartmoor

- Shown within the ceremonial county of Devon
- Interactive map
- Coordinates: 51.0810°N 4.0583°W
- Sovereign state: United Kingdom
- Country: England
- Region: South West
- Ceremonial county: Devon
- Incorporated: 1 April 2028

Government
  - Type: Unitary authority
  - Body: Devon Council

Population (2024 estimate)
  - Total: 459,795
- Time zone: UTC+0 (GMT)
  - Summer (DST): UTC+1 (BST)

Devon was a proposed unitary authority area in the ceremonial county of Devon, England. It was planned to be formed on 1 April 2028, with elections to a shadow authority taking place in May 2027. The area was also named Devon Coast and Countryside during the local government reorganisation process.

The district would have included the county except the areas of Greater Plymouth, Exeter and Torbay and South Devon, which would have their own unitary authorities. The largest settlement will be Barnstaple, and it will also include Axminster, Bideford, Dartmouth, Honiton, Ilfracombe, Kingsbridge, Tiverton and Totnes. The area includes the majority of Dartmoor and some of Exmoor.

Plans to create it were halted in September 2026 and the first election was cancelled. In October 2026, the plans to create it were withdrawn.

== Formation ==
It would have been formed from East Devon (minus 28 parishes), Mid Devon (minus 6 parishes), North Devon, South Hams (minus 17 parishes), Teignbridge (minus 32 parishes), Torridge and West Devon. Other portions of these districts will be going to the new unitary authorities of Exeter, Greater Plymouth and Torbay and South Devon.

The district was being formed as part of ongoing local government changes throughout England, in which all areas of the country that have separate county councils and district councils will see those replaced with single-tier, or unitary, local governance. The alternative proposal for four unitaries and three proposals for three unitaries were not accepted.

In September 2026, the Devon proposals were halted by the government and placed under review. In October 2026, plans to create it were withdrawn. Devon County Council initiated a judicial review of the decision.

== Governance ==
It would have been run by Devon Council, which would comprise 103 councillors.

== Geography ==
The area includes a number of protected areas. It includes most of Dartmoor National Park, part of Exmoor National Park, North Devon Coast National Landscape, South Devon National Landscape, East Devon National Landscape and Blackdown Hills National Landscape.

The area has a population of approximately 455,000.

== Parishes ==
Lundy is currently unparished, the rest of the area is parished.
