= Denbury and Torbryan =

Civil parish in Devon, England

Coordinates: 50.5028°N 3.7159°W

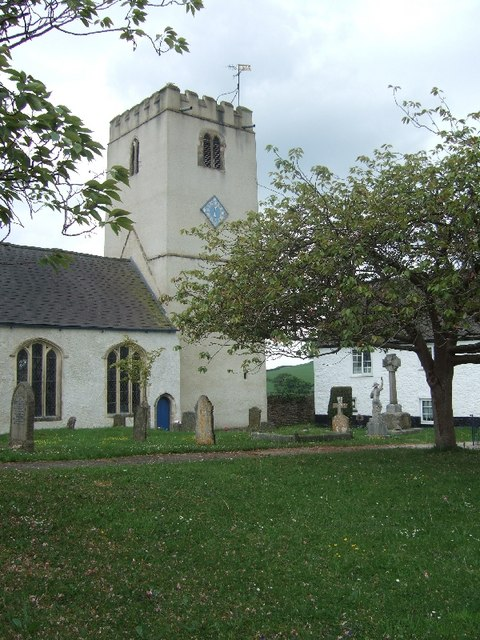
- Denbury Church

- Location within Devon
- Population: 961 (2019)
- Civil parish: Denbury and Torbryan
- Shire county: Devon
- Region: South West
- Country: England
- Sovereign state: United Kingdom
- Post town: Torbryan
- Postcode district: TQ12
- Police: Devon and Cornwall
- Fire: Devon and Somerset
- Ambulance: South Western

Denbury and Torbryan is a civil parish in Teignbridge, Devon, England. It includes the villages of Denbury and Torbryan. As of 2019, it has a population of 961.

== History ==
The parish was renamed from "Denbury" on 1 April 1998.
