= North Whilborough =

Hamlet in Devon, England

Coordinates: 50.487°N 3.594°W

North Whilborough is a hamlet in Teignbridge, Devon, England in the parish of Kingskerswell. It is near the seaside resort of Torquay.
