= Ideford =

Village in Devon, England

- Village
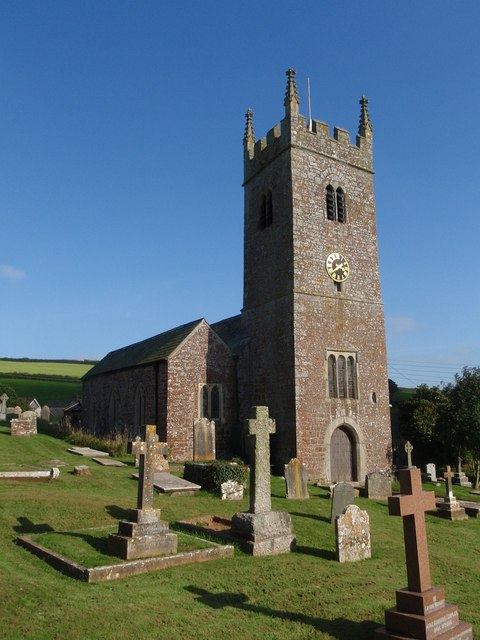
- St Mary's church, Ideford

- Location within Devon Location within the United Kingdom
- Coordinates: 50°35′N 3°34′W
- Country: England
- County: Devon
- District: Teignbridge
- Time zone: UTC+0:00 (GST)

Ideford (or Ideford Parish) is a village in the Teignbridge district of Devon, England. It is 5 miles (8 km) north of Newton Abbot. To the west is the A380 dual carriageway and to the east are Luton and Teignmouth Golf Club. The former single carriageway A380 used to pass over a lane on the "Ideford Arch" but the route is now overgrown.

It is home to the Royal Oak pub (owned by Heavitree Brewery), the grade II listed Ideford Church, Ideford Village Hall (a converted school), and the Millennium Green. Ideford Village Hall (a converted school),
