= Huxham =

Hamlet in Devon, England

Coordinates: 50°46′15″N 3°29′42″W

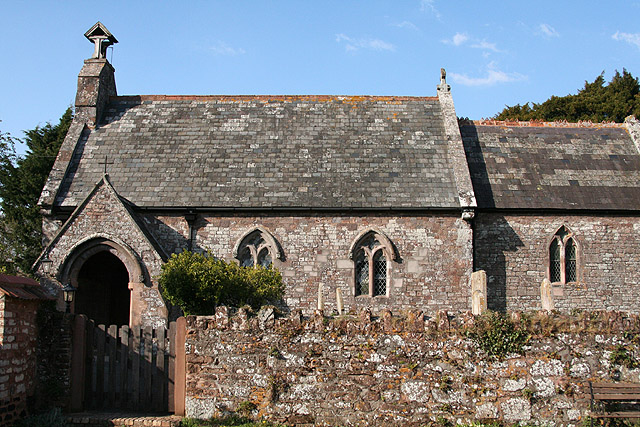
- Huxham, St Mary's church

- Location within Devon
- District: East Devon
- Shire county: Devon
- Region: South West
- Country: England
- Sovereign state: United Kingdom
- Post town: Exeter
- Postcode district: EX5
- Dialling code: 01392
- Police: Devon and Cornwall
- Fire: Devon and Somerset
- Ambulance: South Western
- UK Parliament: Central Devon

Huxham is a hamlet and civil parish in the county of Devon, England and the district of East Devon and lies about 3 miles from Exeter. The parish has an area of about 800 acres and is surrounded, clockwise from the north, by Rewe, Poltimore, Exeter and Stoke Canon. It is too small to have a parish council and instead has a parish meeting. It was formerly part of the Wonford Hundred and gave its name to a family who possessed the manor from the reign of Henry II to that of Edward III. The manor was then held by the Bampfylde family of Poltimore.

== Church ==
The church is dedicated to St Mary the Virgin. It was built in the early 14th century and rebuilt in 1865–71. It has a Norman font and the screen may be very early in date.
