= Ipplepen =

Village in Devon, England

Coordinates: 50.489°N 3.642°W

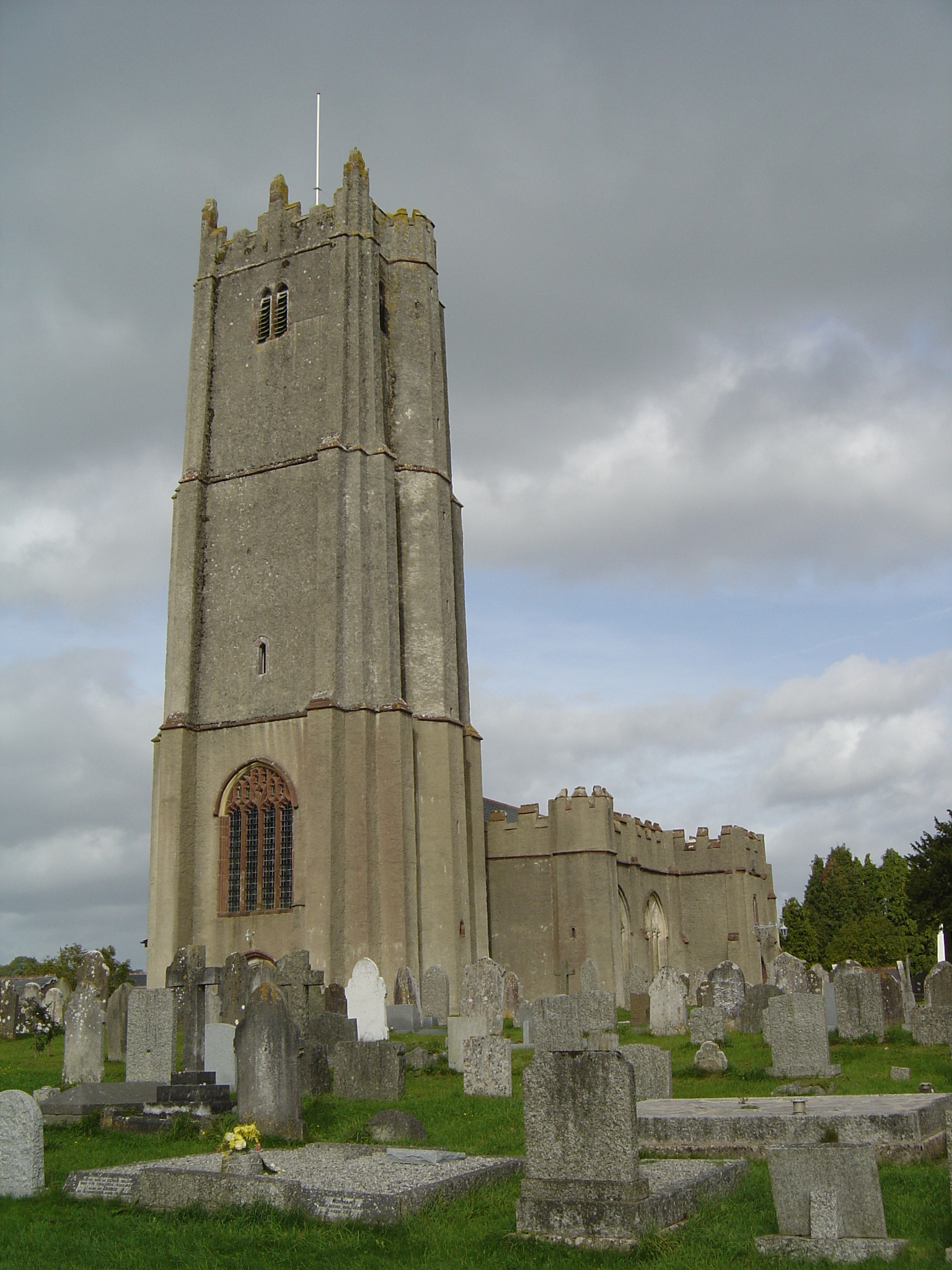
- St Andrew's Parish Church, which is a Grade I listed building

- Location within Devon
- Population: 2,522
- OS grid reference: SX8353766776
- District: Teignbridge
- Shire county: Devon
- Region: South West
- Country: England
- Sovereign state: United Kingdom
- Post town: NEWTON ABBOT
- Postcode district: TQ12
- Dialling code: 01803
- Police: Devon and Cornwall
- Fire: Devon and Somerset
- Ambulance: South Western
- UK Parliament: Newton Abbot

Ipplepen is a village and civil parish located within the Teignbridge district of the county of Devon in south-west England. It is the site of Ipplepen Priory and there is an electoral ward with the same name. The population of Ipplepen village and Ipplepen civil parish at the 2021 census was 2,149 and 2,522 respectively.

== Location ==
Ipplepen is situated about 3.7 miles (6 km) to the southwest of the market town of Newton Abbot, 5.6 miles (9 km) from the southern edge of Dartmoor and about 6.8 miles (11 km) to the northwest of Torquay. Other nearby villages include Torbryan, Broadhempston, Denbury, Marldon and Abbotskerswell.

== Amenities ==
Ipplepen now has only one public house, the Wellington, situated close to the heart of the village on the main road. The Plough Inn, adjacent to the Conservative Club, closed in January 2009 and was then put up for sale. The village has a primary school, park, bowling club, village hall, post office, general store, two churches and a medical centre. The local football club features two senior sides and seven youth teams. The village library closed temporarily in 2008, while a new library building was being built.

The main transport link is the A381 road to Newton Abbot and Totnes. The South Devon Main Line passes nearby and the incline at Dainton Bank is an established location for trainspotting, but there is no local rail connection. At one time, Stoneycombe Quarry had a siding here, but now stone is taken out by road.

== Population ==
The population of Ipplepen during 1801 and 1901 was 821 and 813 respectively. By the time of the 1991 Census in the United Kingdom, the population of "Ipplepen with Torbryan" had increased to 2446. The average age was 42 years and 68.9% were reported as being in "good health".

== Archaeology ==
Archaeological excavations in Ipplepen have found Roman coins, a portion of a Roman road, a Roman-era butcher's shop and various broken ceramics of Mediterranean and Gallic origin, which once contained wine, olive oil and garum (fish sauce). During 2015, an important Roman cemetery was uncovered by a team from the University of Exeter. Tests on one skeleton revealed that activity continued at the site for 350 years after the end of the Roman occupation of Britain (c. 410 AD). Archaeologists said that "the discoveries were both nationally and regionally important." The site was originally discovered by metal detectorists.

== Notable residents ==
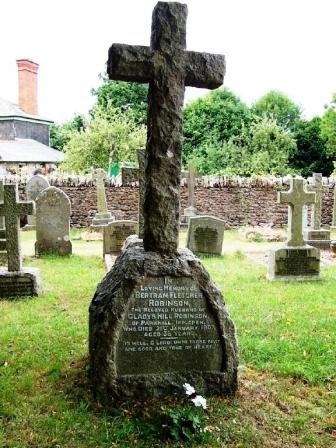
Headstone of Bertram Fletcher Robinson at St Andrew's Parish Church

Notable residents of the past and present include:

- Rev John Hewett (1830–1911), was a formal rural dean of Ipplepen.
- Sir William Robert Patrick Knox-Johnston (born 1939) is a British sailor. In 1969, he became the first person to perform a single-handed non-stop circumnavigation of the globe.
- Sir Alfred Langler (1865–1928), journalist and editor.
- Jon Lee (born 1982), actor and former vocalist with pop group S Club, lived in Ipplepen from age 7.
- John Fowles (1926-2005), novelist was evacuated to the village, as a child, during World War II.
- Bertram Fletcher Robinson (1870–1907), journalist, sportsman, editor & author. He is buried within the graveyard of St Andrew's Parish Church next to his parents.
- David St John Thomas (1929–2014), writer and publisher, first ran the publishing house of David & Charles from his house at Ipplepen, before moving to Newton Abbot railway station.
- William John Wills (1834–1861), explorer of Australia, died in the Burke and Wills expedition.

== Twin towns – sister cities ==
Since 1986, Ipplepen has been twinned with:

- Soliers, France.

== See also ==
- A381 road
