= Bishopsteignton =

Village in Devon, England

Coordinates: 50.554°N 3.542°W

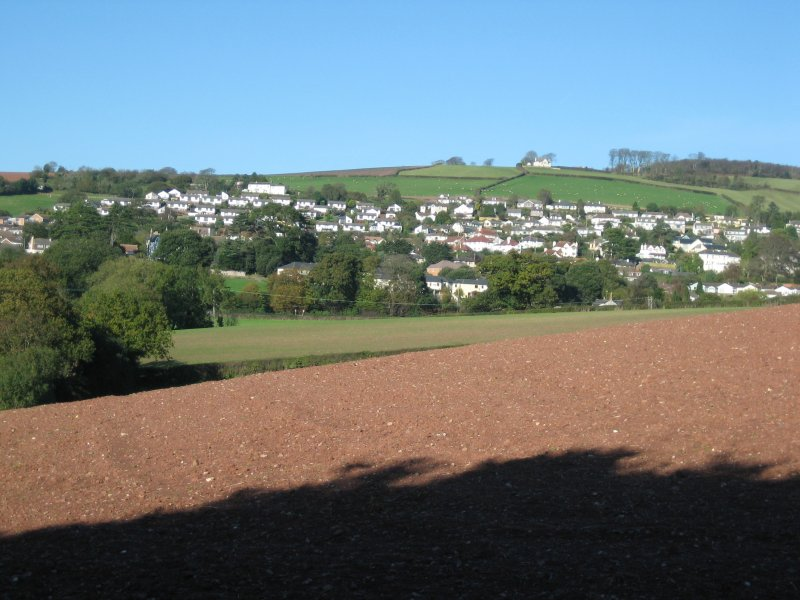
- Bishopsteignton in 2006

- Location within Devon
- Population: 2,570 (2011 Census)
- OS grid reference: SX908738
- District: Teignbridge
- Shire county: Devon
- Region: South West
- Country: England
- Sovereign state: United Kingdom
- Post town: Teignmouth
- Postcode district: TQ14
- Dialling code: 01626
- Police: Devon and Cornwall
- Fire: Devon and Somerset
- Ambulance: South Western
- UK Parliament: Newton Abbot

Bishopsteignton /ˌbɪʃəpˈsteɪntən/ is a village and civil parish in South Devon, England, between Newton Abbot and Teignmouth, close to the Teign Estuary. The village is on a steep hill, and has a post office and pharmacy and a small, family-run village shop. The village school has about 180 pupils. The electoral ward had a population of 2,570 at the 2011 census.

The village has three churches: one Gospel Hall (Plymouth Brethren), one Methodist and one Anglican, St John The Baptist, with a fine Norman doorway that survived Victorian restoration. Among the tombstones are some who were victims of plague, and above the churchyard are the remains of a 14th-century sanctuary chapel built by John Grandisson, Bishop of Exeter to provide a refuge for felons who had accepted life banishment, as they travelled from Exeter to sail from Teignmouth.

The village has four pubs: The Old Commercial, The Old Workshop, the Ring of Bells and the Cockhaven Arms. It also has a local brewery called Red Rock based behind the Old Workshop pub, the Old Walls Vineyard and Shute Fruit and Produce, a pick your own field.

There is a small beach on the estuary, known locally as Down Steps, the River Beach or Red Rock. It is reached via a footpath from the village that crosses the main Teignmouth to Newton Abbot road and the railway, and goes down the steep Luxton Steps. This ancient footpath leads to the point where villagers could ford the river at low tide to reach Coombe Cellars.

Half a mile away is the Bishop's Palace, now a ruin (hence the local name of the Old Walls), built in the 13th century by Walter de Bronescombe, and expanded later by Grandisson. It is an example of a small and compact bishop's palace and the remains include an inner and outer court plus substantial buried remains. The site is a scheduled monument and Grade II* listed building.

The civil parish also includes the hamlet of Ashwell, half a mile west of the village, and the village of Luton, 2 miles north of Bishopsteignton.
