= Starcross =

Village in Devon, England

Coordinates: 50.6267°N 3.4474°W

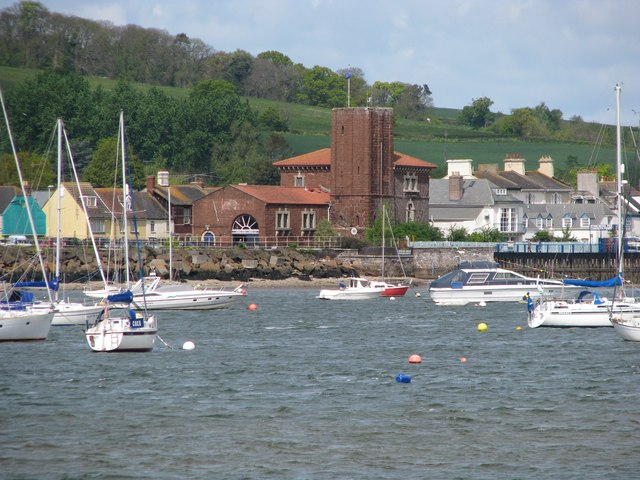
- The Brunel Pumping Station

- Location within Devon
- Population: 1,737 (2011)
- OS grid reference: SX976818
- Civil parish: Starcross
- District: Teignbridge
- Shire county: Devon
- Region: South West
- Country: England
- Sovereign state: United Kingdom
- Post town: EXETER
- Postcode district: EX6
- Dialling code: 01626
- Police: Devon and Cornwall
- Fire: Devon and Somerset
- Ambulance: South Western
- UK Parliament: Newton Abbot

Starcross /stɑːrˈkrɒs/ is a village with a 2021 census recorded population of 1,694 situated on the west shore of the Exe Estuary in Teignbridge in the English county of Devon. The village is popular in summer with leisure craft, and is home to one of the United Kingdom's oldest sailing clubs.

The A379 road and the London to Penzance railway line both run through the village along the banks of the estuary. Starcross railway station is situated on the railway, and the Starcross to Exmouth Ferry, a small passenger ferry, operates across the estuary to Exmouth.

A notable feature of Starcross is the Italianate pumping engine house, the best surviving building from Brunel's unsuccessful Atmospheric Railway. The enterprise is commemorated in the Atmospheric Railway pub located opposite the present-day railway station. Note that the Brunel pumphouse now houses the Starcross Fishing and Cruising Club rather than a museum dedicated to the atmospheric railway, as quoted in many guide books.

St. Paul's Church is found on Church Street, opposite the Almshouses. It was mentioned in Piggott and Co.'s pocket atlas, topography and gazetteer of England 1840 as St. Paul's Chapel.

Powderham Castle is located north of Starcross on the A379 road towards the village of Kenton.

== Climate ==
Climate data for Starcross (1959–1990 averages)
Month	Jan	Feb	Mar	Apr	May	Jun	Jul	Aug	Sep	Oct	Nov	Dec	Year
Mean daily maximum °C (°F)	9 (48)	9 (48)	11 (52)	13 (55)	17 (63)	20 (68)	22 (72)	21 (70)	19 (66)	15 (59)	11 (52)	9 (48)	15 (58)
Mean daily minimum °C (°F)	3 (37)	3 (37)	4 (39)	4 (39)	7 (45)	10 (50)	12 (54)	12 (54)	10 (50)	8 (46)	5 (41)	3 (37)	7 (44)
Average precipitation mm (inches)	92.3 (3.63)	72.4 (2.85)	70.7 (2.78)	57.3 (2.26)	60.5 (2.38)	51.0 (2.01)	50.5 (1.99)	57.7 (2.27)	62.0 (2.44)	95.7 (3.77)	91.3 (3.59)	107.3 (4.22)	868.7 (34.19)
Mean monthly sunshine hours	59.2	74.7	121.3	168.6	206.3	211.5	214.3	195.9	155.8	104.8	74.1	56.9	1,643.4
