= Teignbridge =

Coordinates: 50.582°N 3.628°W

Teignbridge District
- Non-metropolitan district
- Teignbridge shown within Devon
- Sovereign state: United Kingdom
- Constituent country: England
- Region: South West England
- Non-metropolitan county: Devon
- Status: Non-metropolitan district
- Admin HQ: Newton Abbot
- Incorporated: 1 April 1974

Government
  - Type: Non-metropolitan district council
  - Body: Teignbridge District Council
  - Leadership: Leader & Cabinet (Liberal Democrats)
  - MPs: Mel Stride; Martin Wrigley

Area
  - Total: 246.3 sq mi (637.9 km^{2})
  - Rank: 49th (of 296)

Population (2025)
  - Total: 138,607
  - Rank: 175th (of 296)
  - Density: 562.8/sq mi (217.3/km^{2})
  - Ethnicity: 97.7% White (94.9% White British)
- Time zone: UTC0 (GMT)
  - Summer (DST): UTC+1 (BST)
- ONS code: 18UH (ONS); E07000045 (GSS)
- OS grid reference: SX8475477137
- Website: www.teignbridge.gov.uk

Teignbridge (/ˈtiːnbrɪdʒ/ TEEN-brij) is a local government district in Devon, England. Its council is based in the town of Newton Abbot. The district also includes the towns of Ashburton, Buckfastleigh, Dawlish, Bovey Tracey, Kingsteignton and Teignmouth, along with numerous villages and surrounding rural areas. Teignbridge contains part of the south Devon coastline, including the Dawlish Warren National Nature Reserve. Some of the inland western parts of the district lie within the Dartmoor National Park. It is named after the old Teignbridge hundred.

The neighbouring districts are Torbay, South Hams, West Devon, Mid Devon, East Devon and Exeter.

== History ==
The district was formed on 1 April 1974 under the Local Government Act 1972, covering the whole area of six former districts and part of a seventh, which were all abolished at the same time:

- Ashburton Urban District
- Buckfastleigh Urban District
- Dawlish Urban District
- Newton Abbot Rural District
- Newton Abbot Urban District
- St Thomas Rural District (parts south-west of Exeter, rest went to East Devon)
- Teignmouth Urban District

The new district was named Teignbridge after the medieval hundred of that name which had covered some of the area. The hundred in turn had been named after the bridge over the River Teign on Exeter Road west of Kingsteignton, where there had been a number of bridges since Roman times.

In July 2026, it was announced that Teignbridge District Council would be abolished as part of the nationwide Local Government Reorganisation programme aiming to replace two-tier governance with unitary authorities. 15 parishes from Teignbridge, including towns such as Dawlish, will be incorporated into a new Exeter unitary authority; 16 parishes, including towns such as Newton Abbot, will be incorporated into an expanded Torbay and South Devon unitary authority; the remaining parishes will be incorporated into a new Devon unitary authority. The changes are planned to come into full effect as of 2028.

== Governance ==
Teignbridge District Council

Type
- Type: Non-metropolitan district council

History
- Founded: 1 April 1974

Leadership
- Chair: Robert Steemson, Independent since 20 May 2025
- Leader: Richard Keeling, Liberal Democrats since 30 July 2024
- Managing Director: Phil Shears since January 2018

Structure
- Seats: 47 councillors
- Graph of the party split among 47 seats.
- Political groups: Administration (25) Liberal Democrats (25) Other parties (22) Conservatives (9) Reform UK (1) Independent (12)

Elections
- Voting system: Plurality-at-large
- Last election: 4 May 2023

Meeting place
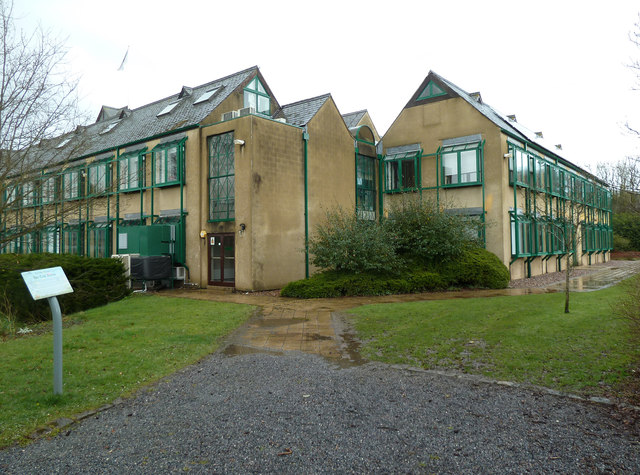
- Forde House, Brunel Road, Newton Abbot, TQ12 4XX

Website
- www.teignbridge.gov.uk

Constitution
- The Constitution of Teignbridge District Council

Teignbridge District Council provides district-level services. County-level services are provided by Devon County Council. The whole district is also covered by civil parishes, which form a third tier of local government.

In the parts of the district within the Dartmoor National Park, town planning is the responsibility of the Dartmoor National Park Authority. The district council appoints two of its councillors to serve on the 19-person National Park Authority.

=== Political control ===
The council has been under Liberal Democrat majority control since the 2023 election.

The first election to the council was held in 1973, initially operating as a shadow authority alongside the outgoing authorities before coming into its powers on 1 April 1974. Political control of the council since 1974 has been as follows:

Party in control	Years
Independent	1974–1983
No overall control	1983–2011
Conservative	2011–2019
Liberal Democrats	2019–2021
No overall control	2021–2023
Liberal Democrats	2023–present

=== Leadership ===
The leaders of the council since 2003 have been:

Councillor	Party	From	To
Alan Connett	Liberal Democrats	2003	2011
Jeremy Christophers	Conservative	2011	May 2019
Gordon Hook	Liberal Democrats	20 May 2019	3 Sep 2020
Alan Connett	Liberal Democrats	3 Sep 2020	May 2023
Martin Wrigley	Liberal Democrats	23 May 2023	30 July 2024
Richard Keeling	Liberal Democrats	30 July 2024	

=== Composition ===
Following the 2023 election and subsequent by-elections and changes of allegiance up to August 2026, the composition of the council was:

Party	Councillors
Liberal Democrats	25
Conservative	9
Reform	1
Independent	12
Total	47

Ten of the independent councillors form the "Independent Group", the other two are not aligned to a group.

=== Elections ===
Since the last boundary changes in 2019 the council has comprised 47 councillors representing 24 wards, with each ward electing one, two or three councillors. Elections are held every four years.

=== Premises ===
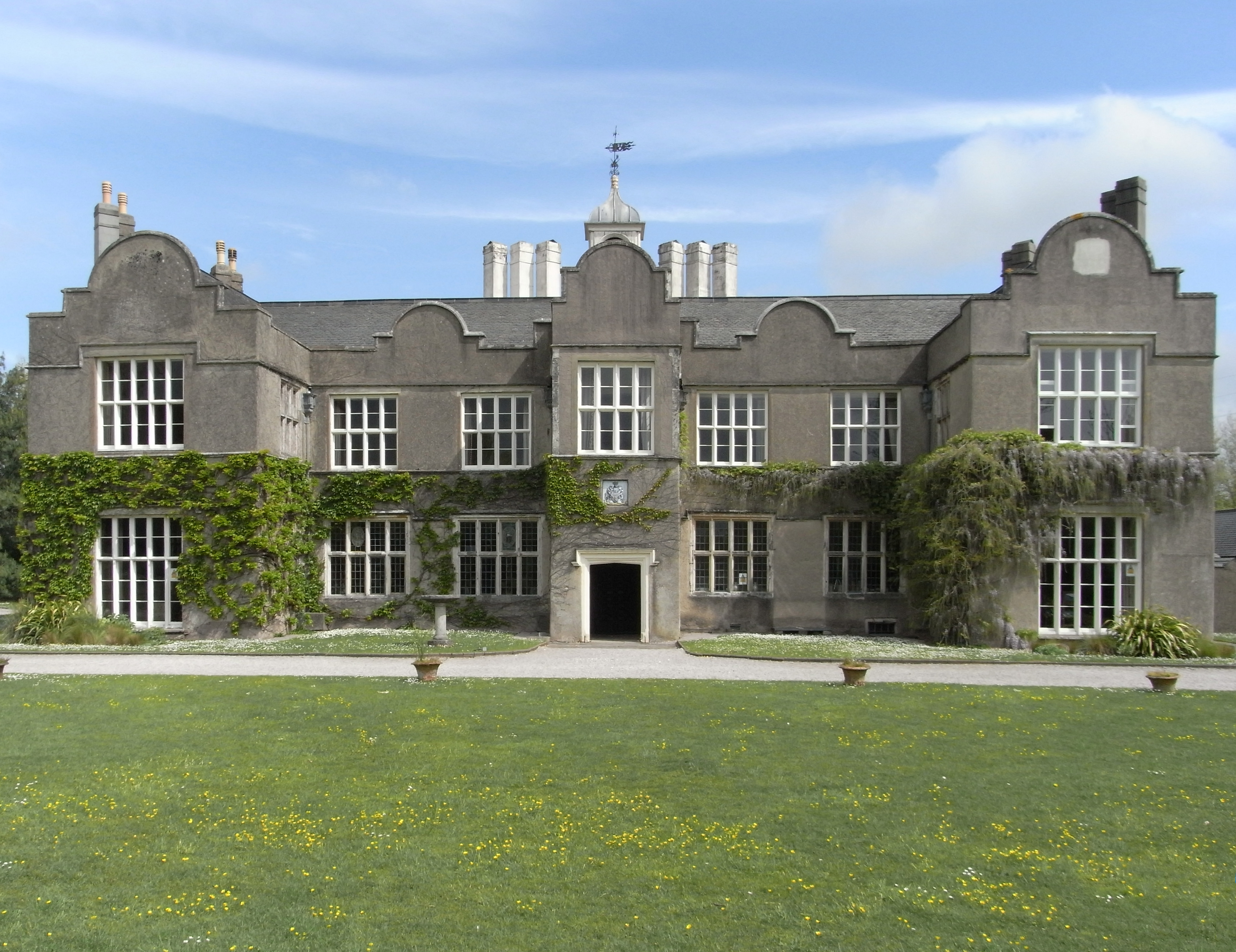
Old Forde House

The council is based at Forde House on Brunel Road in Newton Abbot.

The council bought the Forde House estate in 1978 for £60,000. The estate comprised a Tudor mansion and its grounds. A modern office building was built in the grounds to serve as the council's headquarters, being formally opened on 27 April 1987. The new office building now takes the name Forde House, with the old mansion now called Old Forde House.

== Parishes and settlements ==
The district is entirely divided into civil parishes. Some of the smaller parishes have a parish meeting rather than a parish council. The parish councils for Ashburton, Buckfastleigh, Dawlish, Kingsteignton, Newton Abbot and Teignmouth take the style "town council".

Settlements in the district include:

- Abbotskerswell
- Ashburton
- Ashcombe
- Ashton
- Bickington
- Bishopsteignton
- Bovey Tracey
- Bridford
- Brimley
- Broadhempston
- Buckfastleigh
- Buckland in the Moor
- Christow
- Chudleigh
- Chudleigh Knighton
- Cockwood
- Coffinswell
- Combe Fishacre
- Combeinteignhead
- Dainton
- Dawlish
- Dawlish Warren
- Denbury
- Doddiscombsleigh
- Dunchideock
- Dunsford
- Exminster
- Forder Green
- Gabwell
- Gappah
- Haytor vale
- Heathfield
- Hennock
- Holcombe
- Humber
- Ide
- Ideford
- Ilsington
- Ipplepen
- Kenn
- Kennford
- Kenton
- Kingskerswell
- Kingsteignton
- Liverton
- Lustleigh
- Luton
- Mamhead
- Manaton
- Moretonhampstead
- Nadderwater
- Netherton
- Newton Abbot
- North Bovey
- North Whilborough
- Ogwell
- Pathfinder Village
- Ponsworthy
- Poundsgate
- Powderham
- Ringmore
- Shaldon
- Shillingford Abbot
- Shillingford St George
- Sigford
- South Knighton
- Starcross
- Stokeinteignhead
- Tedburn St Mary
- Teign Village
- Teigngrace
- Teignmouth
- Torbryan
- Trusham
- Water
- Whitestone
- Widecombe-in-the-Moor
- Woodland
