= Denbury =

Village in Devon, England

Coordinates: 50.50775°N 3.66051°W

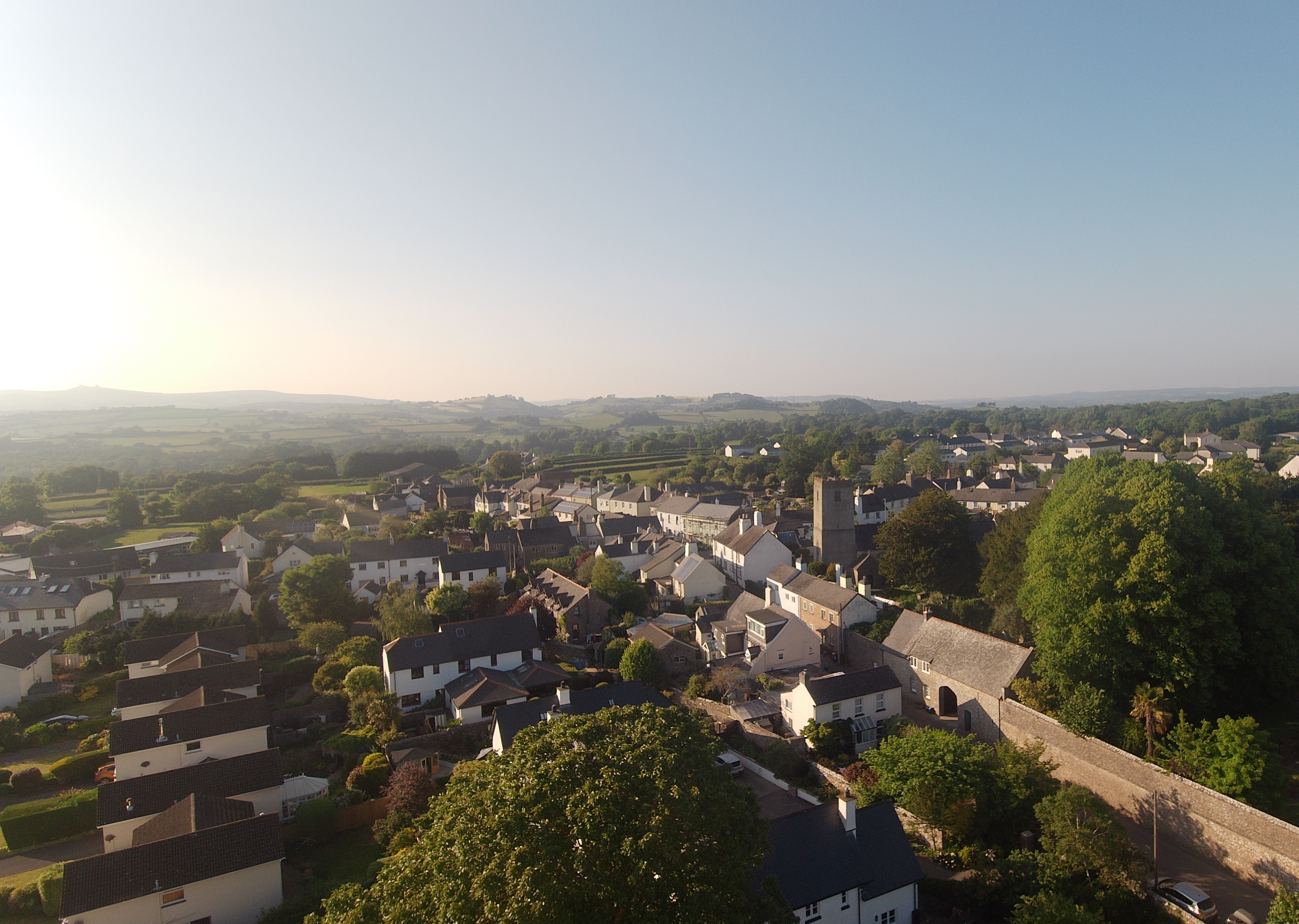
- Aerial view of Denbury

- Location within Devon
- Population: 982 (as stated on citypopulation.de)
- OS grid reference: SX823688
- Civil parish: Denbury and Torbryan
- District: Teignbridge
- Shire county: Devon
- Region: South West
- Country: England
- Sovereign state: United Kingdom
- Post town: NEWTON ABBOT
- Postcode district: TQ12
- Dialling code: 01803
- Police: Devon and Cornwall
- Fire: Devon and Somerset
- Ambulance: South Western
- UK Parliament: Newton Abbot

Denbury is a village and former civil parish, now in the parish of Denbury and Torbryan, in Teignbridge district of Devon, England. The village is situated between Totnes and Newton Abbot, approximately ten miles from Torquay.

Denbury Hill (Locally known as Denbury Down) is an Iron Age Hill fort which is located to the south west of the village. The area has a long history of human habitation, with Denbury Manor being owned by Ealdred, Archbishop of York, before the Norman conquest of England in 1066. The Parish Church of St Mary the Virgin in the village dates from 12th century.

The United States Army built a camp and shooting range in the village in the run up to the invasion of Europe in 1944. In 1967 The Royal Corps of Signals, Junior Leaders Regiment left Denbury Camp (1955 - 1967), 47 Lt Regiment, Royal Artillery (returning from Aden) moved in around September 1967 and finally left in about April 1969 when they moved to Houndstone Camp, Yeovil. They were part of 24 Brigade. Thereafter, Channings Wood Prison was constructed on most of the site. Today, Channings Wood is a Category C prison for men from all over South Western England, and is the biggest employer in Denbury. The other part of the former military base is now the Denbury Range, home of the Torbay Fullbore Club.

The village today comprises 300 households including farms in the surrounding area. The village also is near the centre of Ambrook electoral ward. The population of the ward at the 2011 census was 6,180.

== Civil parish ==
In 1881 the parish had a population of 331. On 25 March 1885 the parish was abolished and merged with Torbryan.

== Local events ==
Glas-Denbury is a local music festival founded in July 2012. Created by local villagers to Denbury, has aimed to provide a music and entertainment festival experience locally to Devon and has been popular with both locals and visitors alike. There is also the annual May Fayre organised by a variety of people in the village, where the local primary school (Denbury Primary School) dance around the maypole, which has been the central tradition for centuries. On the 8 and 9 September 2018, there was a village commemoration for the 700th anniversary of the building of the Church, which was constructed in 1318. The celebration included residents dressing up in medieval costumes, the school created their own Wooden Horses which were featured in the procession, which also featured a group of instrumental musicians playing a medieval-style piece - put together by the lead organiser - and a congregation on the green with local businesses and food stalls, similar to what would happen on a usual May Fayre day.

== Manor ==
The historic manor of Denbury was held successively by the families of Reynell, Taylor (the monuments to which family are displayed in the Taylor Chapel of Denbury Church) (both of which families also held the adjoining manors of East Ogwell and West Ogwell), Froude, Curtis, Townsend, and is currently owned by Timothy Roger Howe.

== Church ==
Denbury Church was opened by the bishop of Exeter, Walter de Stapleton in 1318. It is often floodlit at night, sponsored by the village locals to celebrate a special day. There are still services running with the Beacon Parishes Group.

== Education ==
Denbury Primary School is located in the village, just outside of Newton Abbot. It was inspected by Ofsted in 2013 and marked as Good, however, when it was inspected before in 2008, it was marked as outstanding.
