= Kenn, Devon =

Village in Devon, England

Kenn
- Village
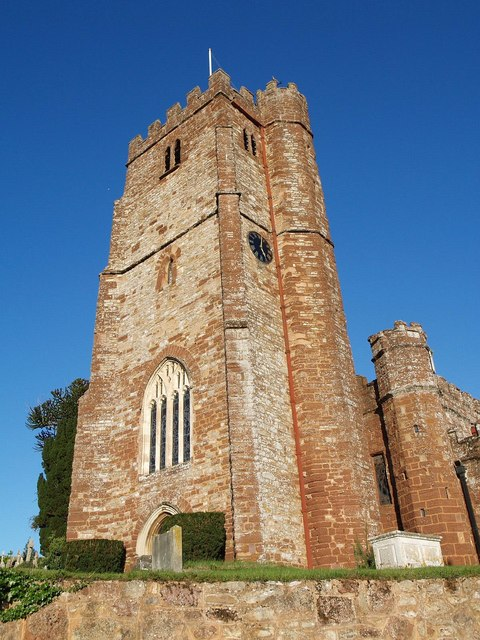
- St Andrew's church, Kenn

- Location within Devon Location within the United Kingdom
- Coordinates: 50.659029°N 3.52686°W
- Country: England
- County: Devon
- District: Teignbridge

Population (2021)
  - Total: 1,071
- Time zone: UTC+0:00 (GST)

Kenn is a village and civil parish situated in Devon, England, approximately 5 miles to the south of Exeter. It lies in the district of Teignbridge, and at the 2021 census had a population of 1,071.

It has a pub and a Parish Church, built of Heavitree stone.
