= List of hundreds of England =

Former land divisions of England

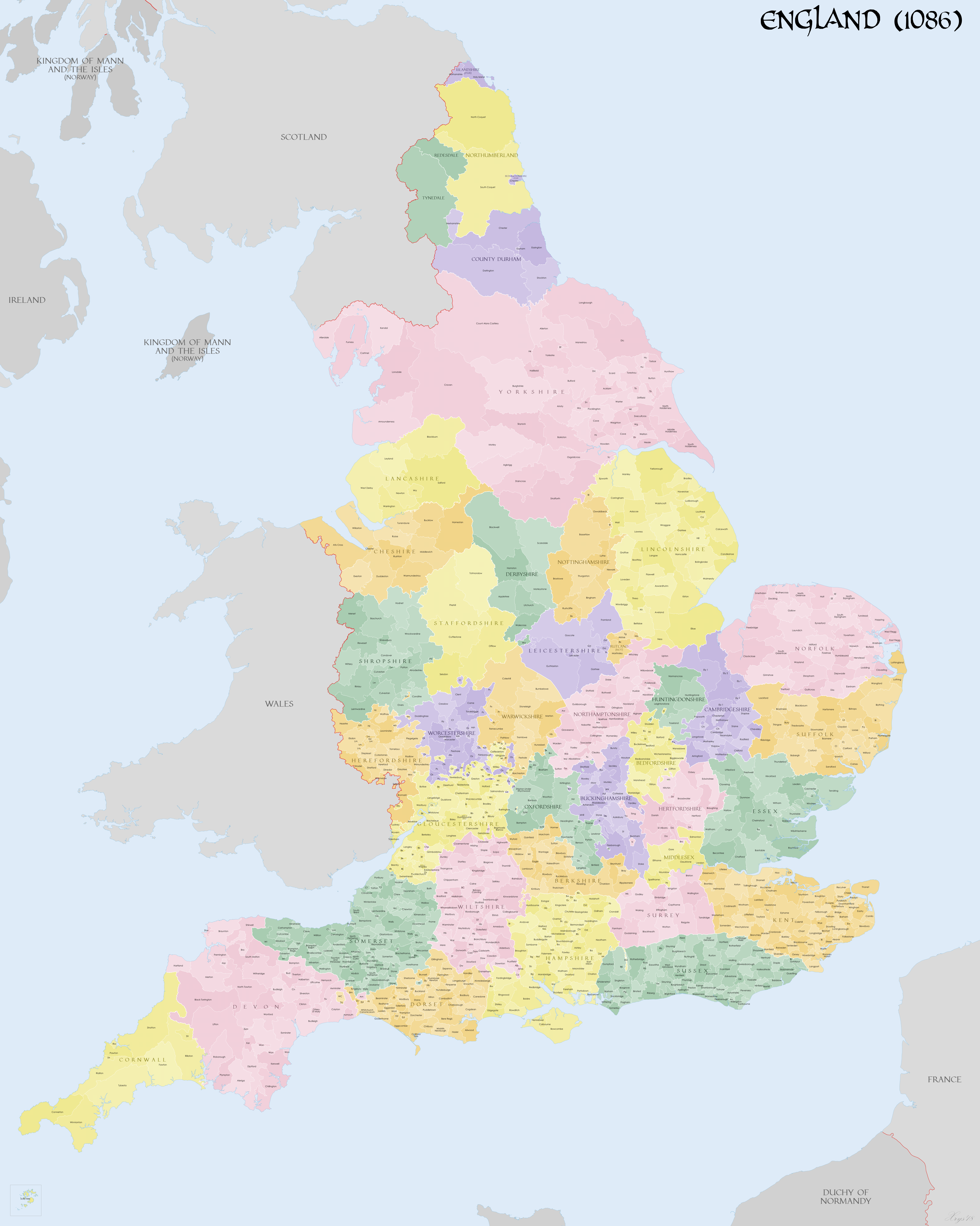
England in 1086 showing hundreds, wapentakes and wards

Most of the counties of England were divided into hundreds or wapentakes from the late Anglo-Saxon period and these were, with a few exceptions, effectively abandoned as administrative divisions in the 19th century.

== Bedfordshire ==
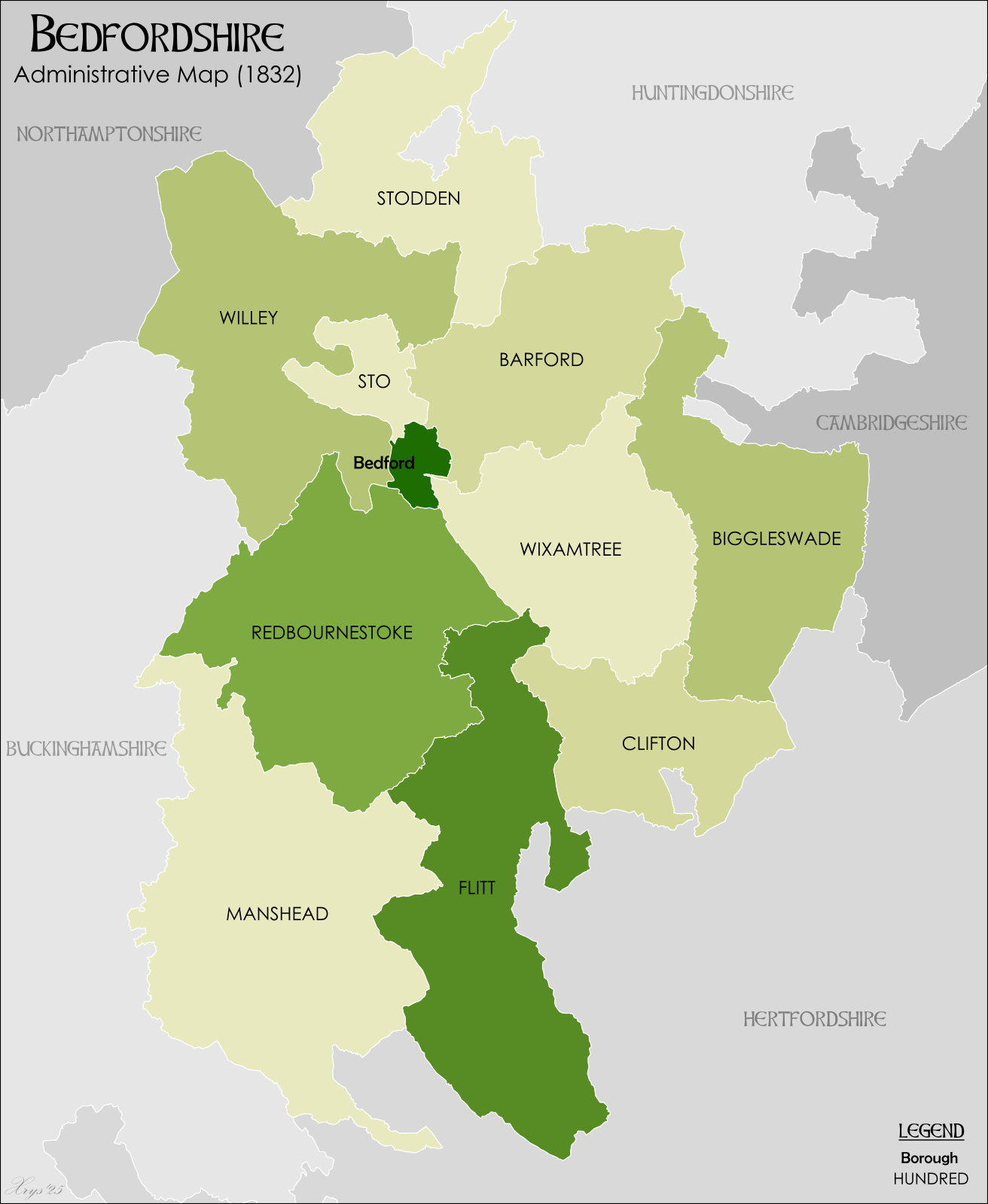
Hundreds of Bedfordshire in 1832

- Barford
- Biggleswade
- Clifton
- Flitt
- Manshead
- Redbornestoke
- Stodden
- Willey
- Wixamtree

== Berkshire ==
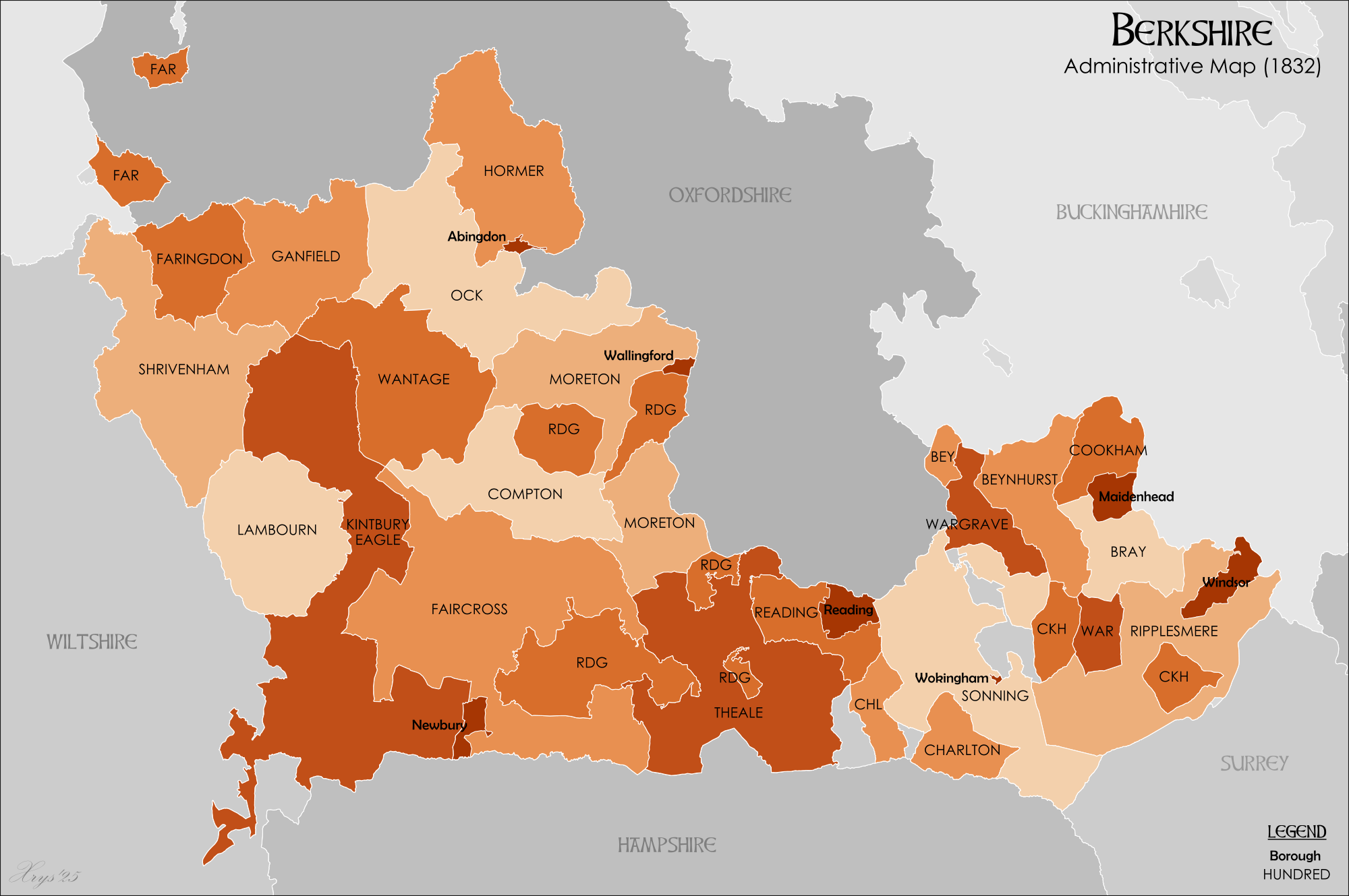
Hundreds of Berkshire in 1832

The County of Berkshire comprised 20 hundreds and 193 parishes and parts of four others. From The National Gazetteer of Britain and Ireland (1868), Victoria County History Berkshire Vol 3 (1923) & Vol 4 (1924)

The Hundreds, parishes and boroughs of Berkshire
| Hundred | Area (acres) | Parishes and boroughs |
|---|---|---|
| Beynhurst | 13,000 | Bisham, Hurley, Remenham, Shottesbrook, White Waltham |
| Bray | 9,102 | Bray, Borough of Maidenhead |
| Charlton | 12,940 | Barkham, Finchampstead, Hurst, Shinfield, Swallowfield |
| Compton | 18,190 | Aldworth, Catmore, Chilton, Compton, East Ilsley, Farnborough, West Ilsley |
| Cookham | 14,330 | Binfield, Cookham, Sunninghill |
| Faircross | 50,000 | Beedon, Boxford, Bright Walton, Brimpton, Chieveley, Frilsham, Hampstead Norris, Borough of Newbury, Peasemore, Sandleford, Shaw cum Donnington, Speen, Stanford Dingley, Wasing, Welford, Yattendon |
| Faringdon^{[2]} | 10,000 | Great Coxwell, Great Faringdon (part) Parishes of the hundred were transferred to Oxfordshire on 1 April 1974. |
| Ganfield | 17,000 | Buckland, Hatford, Hinton Waldrist, Longworth, Pusey, Shellingford, Stanford in the Vale |
| Hormer | 21,550 | Borough of Abingdon, Bagley Wood, Besselsleigh, Cumnor, North Hinksey, Radley, St Helen (part), Seacourt, South Hinksey, Sunningwell, Wytham |
| Kintbury Eagle | 42,560 | Formed in the 16th century by combining parishes of the hundred of Kintbury (Avington, Enborne, Hampstead Marshall, Hungerford, Inkpen, Kintbury, Shalbourne, West Woodhay) and parishes of the hundred of Eagle (Chaddleworth, East Challow, East Shefford, Fawley with Whatcombe, Letcombe Bassett, Letcombe Regis, West Challow, West Shefford). Parts of Hungerford and Shalbourne parishes were in the hundred of Kinwardstone in Wiltshire. The Berkshire portions of Shalbourne were transferred to Wiltshire in 1895. |
| Lambourn | 19,400 | East Garston, Lambourn |
| Moreton | 28,700 | Ashampstead, Aston Tirrold, Basildon, Brightwell, Didcot, East Hagbourne, Harwell, Moulsford, North Moreton, Sotwell, South Moreton, Streatley, Borough of Wallingford, West Hagbourne |
| Ock | 28,250 | Appleton, Drayton, Fyfield, Kingston Bagpuize, Marcham, Milton, Steventon, Sutton Courtney, Tubney, Little Wittenham, Long Wittenham |
| Reading | 37,510 | Blewbury, Bucklebury, Cholsey, Pangbourne, Borough of Reading, Sulhampstead Abbots, Thatcham, Tilehurst |
| Ripplesmere | 22,710 | Clewer, Easthampstead, Old Windsor, Winkfield, Borough of Windsor |
| Shrivenham | 34,490 | Ashbury, Buscot, Coleshill, Compton Beauchamp, Eaton Hastings, Shrivenham, Uffington |
| Sonning | 21,830 | Arborfield, Ruscombe, Sandhurst, Sonning, Wokingham |
| Theale | 28,160 | Aldermaston, Bradfield, Burghfield, Englefield, Padworth, Purley, Stratfield Mortimer, Sulham, Sulhampstead Bannister, Tidmarsh, Ufton Nervet, Woolhampton |
| Wantage | 28,160 | Ardington, Childrey, Denchworth, East Garston, East Hendred, East Lockinge, Sparsholt, West Hanney, West Hendred, West Lockinge, Wantage |
| Wargrave | 11,220 | Waltham St. Laurence, Warfield, Wargrave |

== Buckinghamshire ==
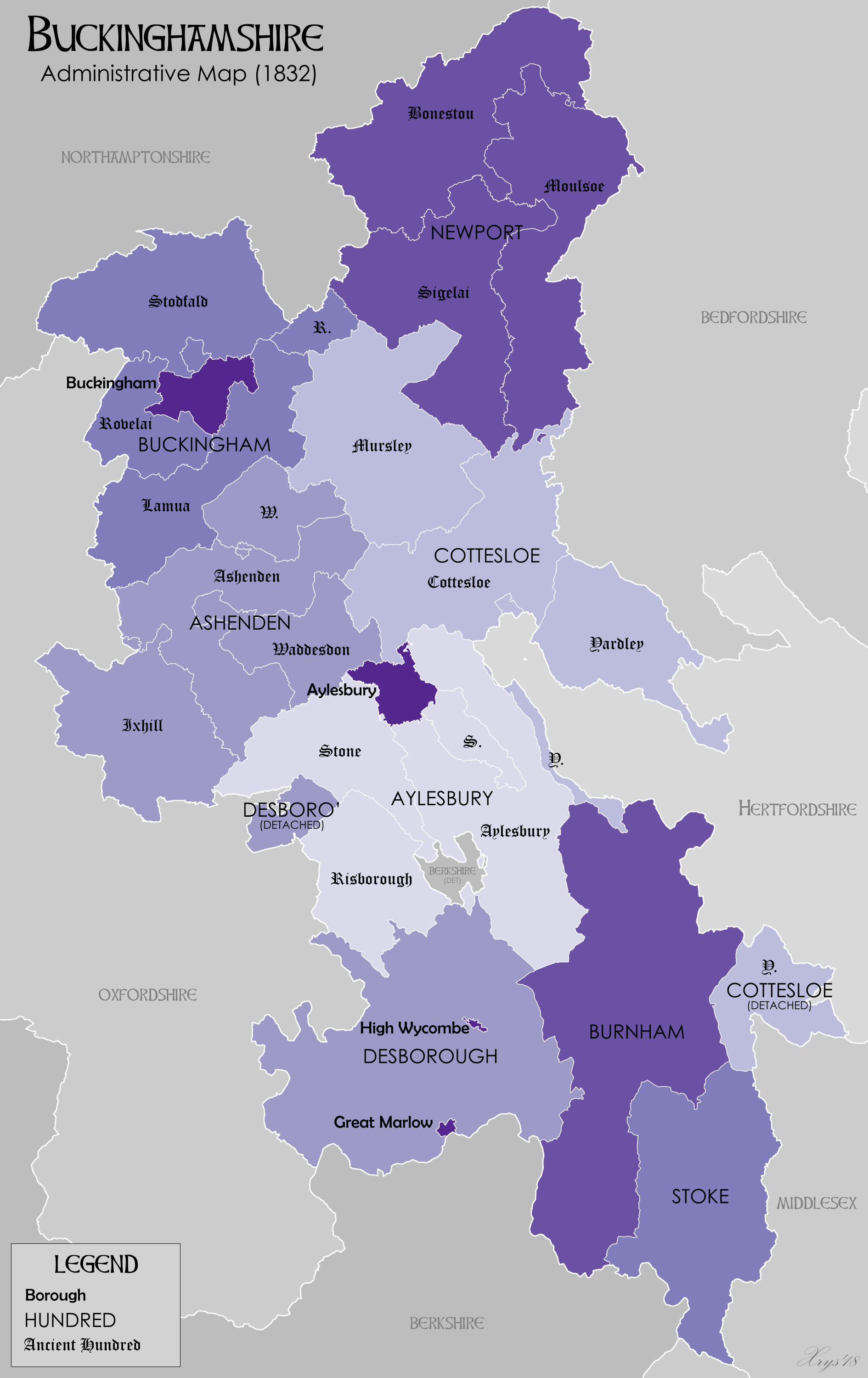
Buckinghamshire Hundreds in 1832

Until at least the time of the Domesday Survey in 1086 there were 18 hundreds in Buckinghamshire. It has been suggested, however, that neighbouring hundreds had already become more closely associated in the 11th century, so that by the end of the 14th century the original or ancient hundreds had been consolidated into eight larger hundreds, as follows:

- Ashendon Hundred
- Aylesbury Hundred – consolidated from the 11th century Aylesbury, Risborough and Stone hundreds
- Buckingham Hundred
- Cottesloe Hundred
- Newport Hundred

Chiltern Hundreds

- Burnham Hundred
- Desborough Hundred
- Stoke Hundred

== Cambridgeshire ==
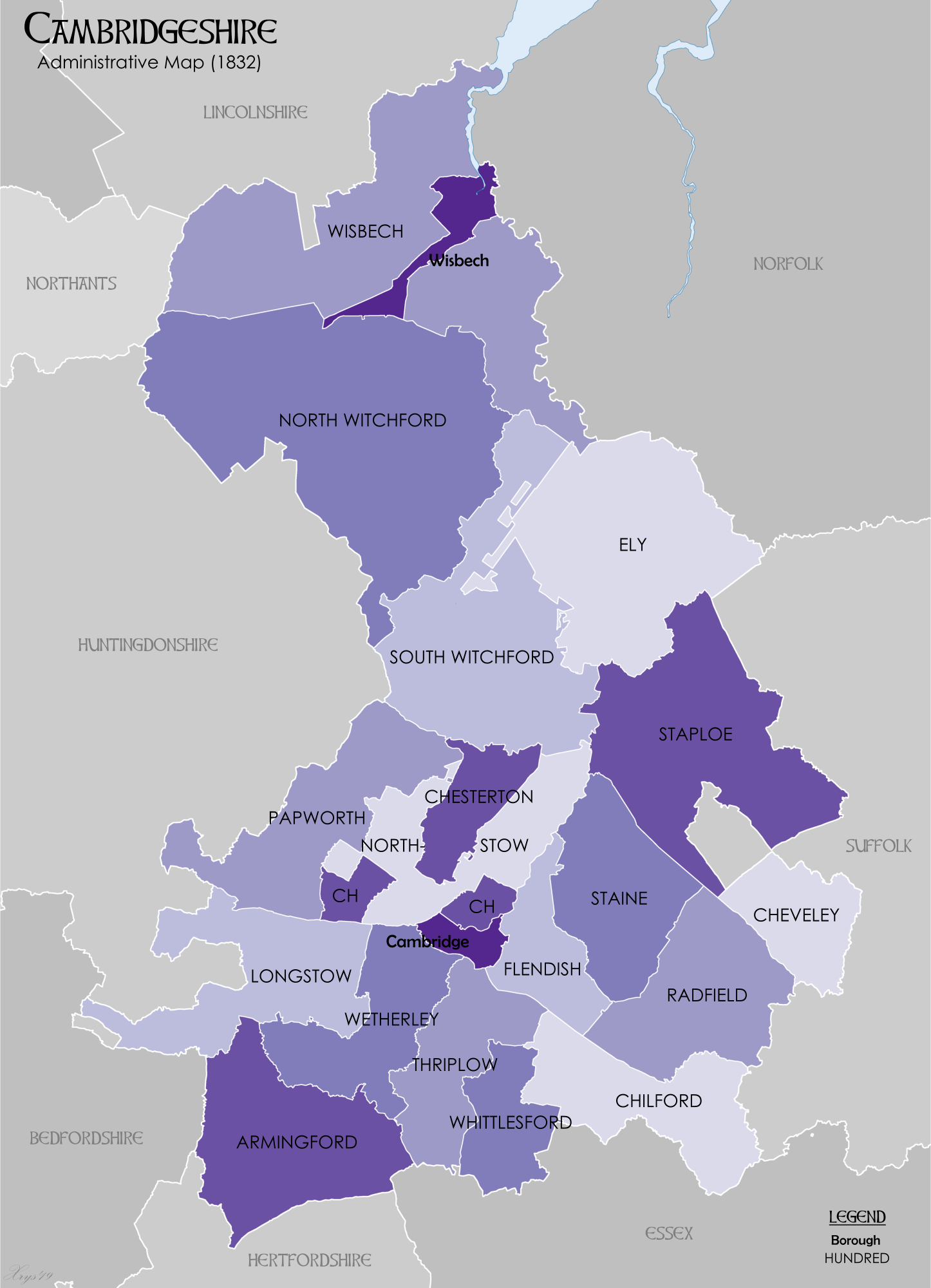
Hundreds of Cambridgeshire in 1832

Cambridgeshire was divided into 17 hundreds, plus the borough of Cambridge. Each hundred had a separate council that met each month to rule on local judicial and taxation matters. In 1929 the hundreds contained the following parishes.

| Hundred | Area (acres) | Parishes |
|---|---|---|
| Armingford | 29,287 | Abington Pigotts, Bassingbourn, Croydon, East Hatley, Guilden Morden, Litlington, Melbourn, Meldreth, Royston (part), Shingay, Steeple Morden, Tadlow, Wendy, Whaddon |
| Chesterton | 15,847 | Chesterton, Childerley, Cottenham, Dry Drayton, Histon |
| Cheveley | 12,905 | Ashley, Cheveley, Kirtling, Newmarket All Saints, Wood Ditton |
| Chilford | 22,364 | Babraham, Bartlow, Castle Camps, Great Abington, Hildersham, Horseheath, Linton, Little Abington, Pampisford, Shudy Camps, West Wickham |
| Ely | 42,667 | Downham, Littleport |
| Flendish | 11,906 | Cherry Hinton, Fen Ditton, Fulbourn, Horningsea, Teversham |
| Longstow | 25,500 | Bourn, Caldecote, Caxton, Croxton, Eltisley, Gamlingay, Great Eversden, Hardwick, Hatley St. George, Kingston, Little Eversden, Little Gransden, Longstowe, Toft |
| North Witchford | 86,275 | Chatteris, Doddington, March, Whittlesey |
| Northstow | 19,651 | Girton, Impington, Landbeach, Lolworth, Longstanton, Madingley, Milton, Oakington, Rampton, Waterbeach |
| Papworth | 26,923 | Boxworth, Conington, Elsworth, Fen Drayton, Graveley, Knapwell, Over, Papworth St Agnes, Papworth Everard, Swavesey, Willingham |
| Radfield | 23,869 | Balsham, Brinkley, Burrough Green, Carlton-cum-Willingham, Dullingham, Stetchworth, West Wratting, Westley Waterless, Weston Colville |
| South Witchford | 37,462 | Coveney, Grunty Fen, Haddenham, Manea, Mepal, Sutton, Stretham and Thetford, Welches Dam, Wentworth, Wilburton, Witcham, Witchford |
| Staine | 18,917 | Bottisham, Great Wilbraham, Little Wilbraham, Swaffham Bulbeck, Swaffham Prior, Stow-cum-Quy |
| Staploe | 40,775 | Burwell, Chippenham, Fordham, Isleham, Kennett, Landwade, Snailwell, Soham, Wicken |
| Thriplow | 16,160 | Fowlmere, Foxton, Great Shelford, Harston, Hauxton, Little Shelford, Newton, Stapleford, Thriplow, Trumpington |
| Wetherley | 16,160 | Arrington, Barrington, Barton, Comberton, Coton, Grantchester, Harlton, Haslingfield, Orwell, Shepreth, Wimpole |
| Whittlesford | 11,078 | Duxford, Hinxton, Ickleton, Sawston, Whittlesford |
| Wisbech | 61,157 | Elm, Leverington, Newton, Outwell, Parson Drove, Thorney, Tydd St. Giles, Upwell, Wisbech, Wisbech St. Mary |

== Cheshire ==
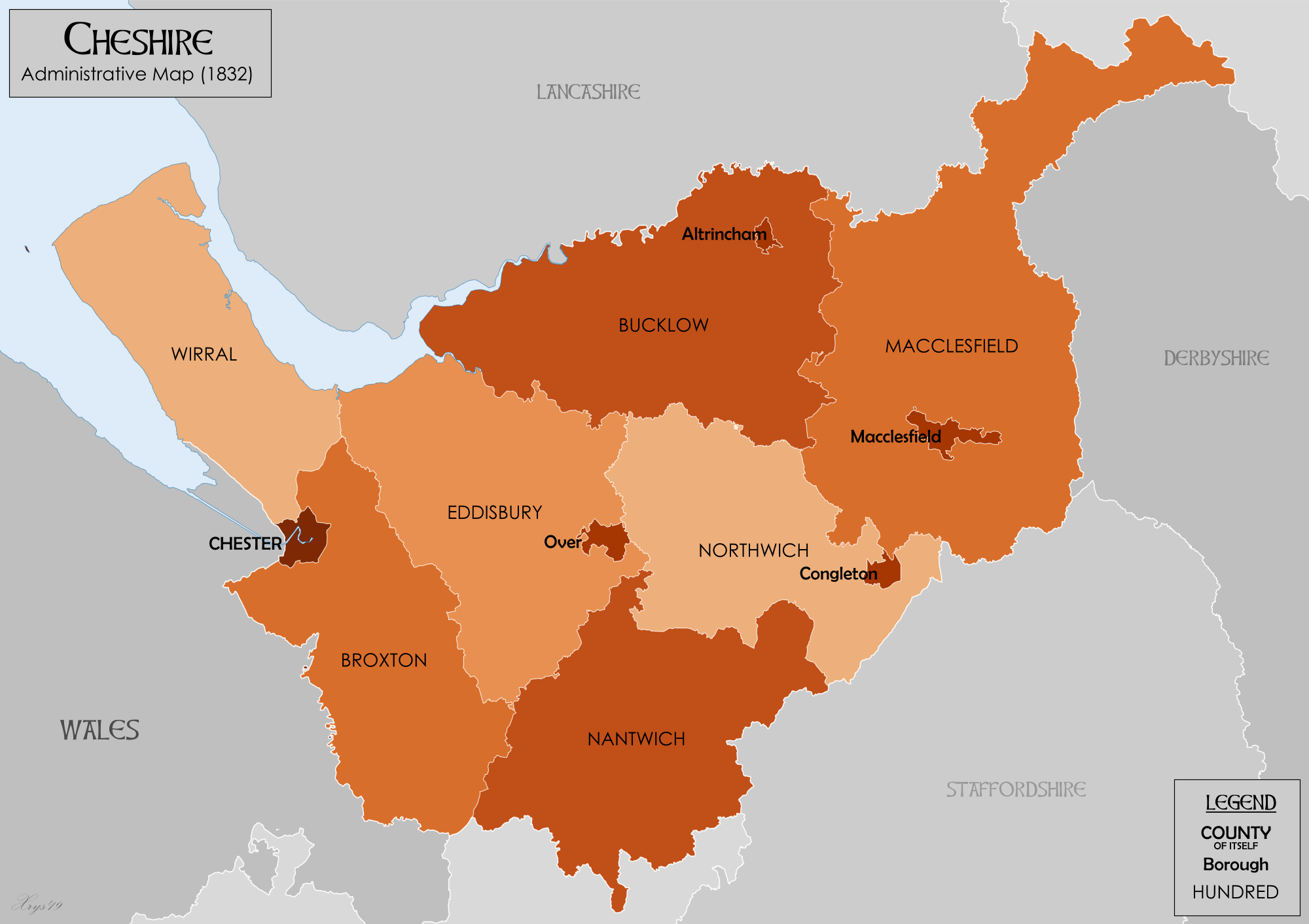
Hundreds of Cheshire in 1832

- Broxton
- Bucklow
- Eddisbury
- Macclesfield
- Nantwich
- Northwich
- Wirral

== Cornwall ==
In Cornwall, the name calqued cantrev

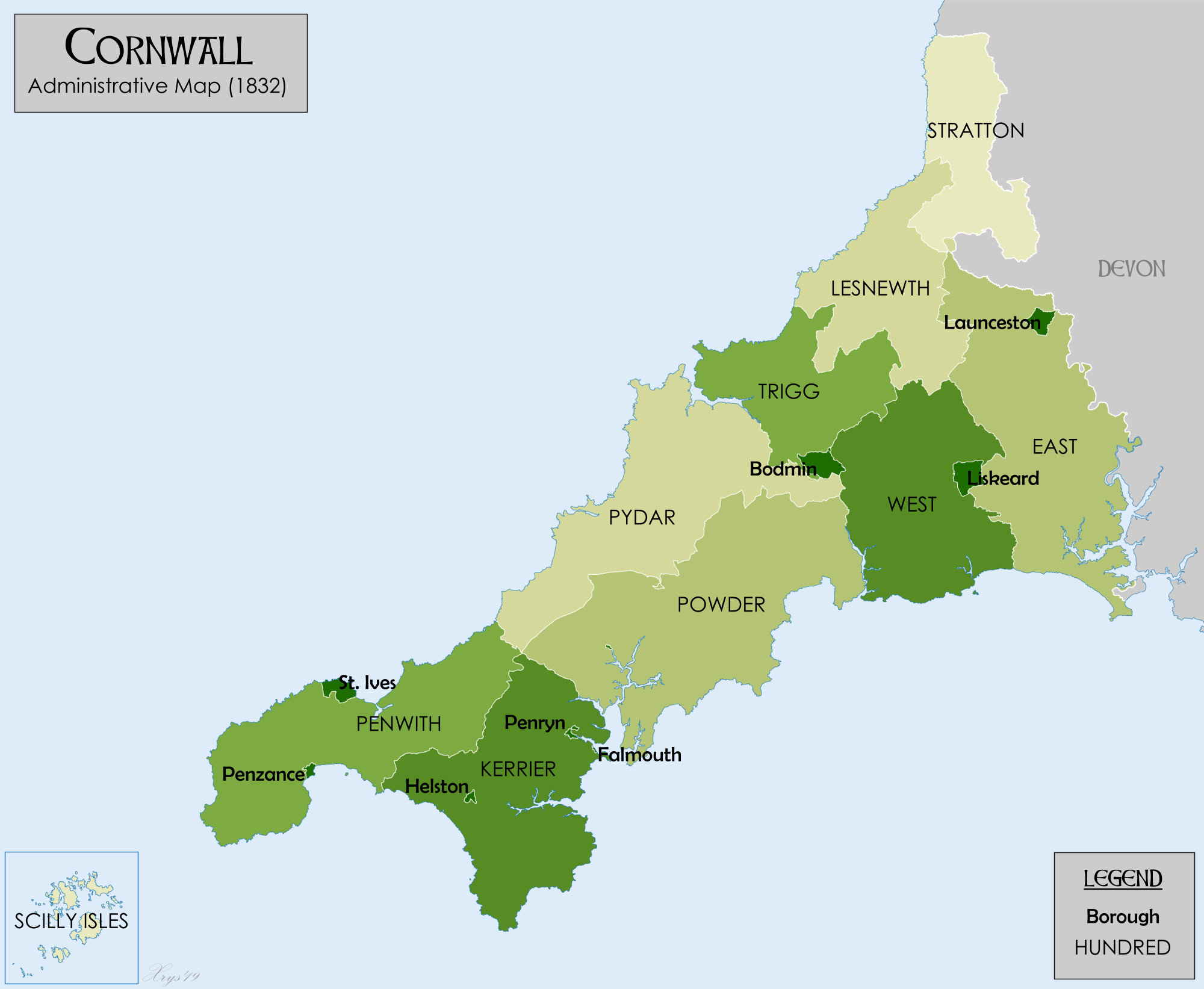
Hundreds of Cornwall in 1832

From GENUKI Genuki: Cornwall, Cornwall

- Penwith (Penwyth)
- Kerrier (Keryer)
- Pydar (Pedera)
- Powder (Pow Ereder)
- Trigg (Trigor)
- Lesnewth (Lysnowyth)
- Stratton (Stradneth)
- West (Fawy)
- East (Ryslegh)

For some purposes, the Isles of Scilly were counted as a tenth hundred.

== Cumberland ==
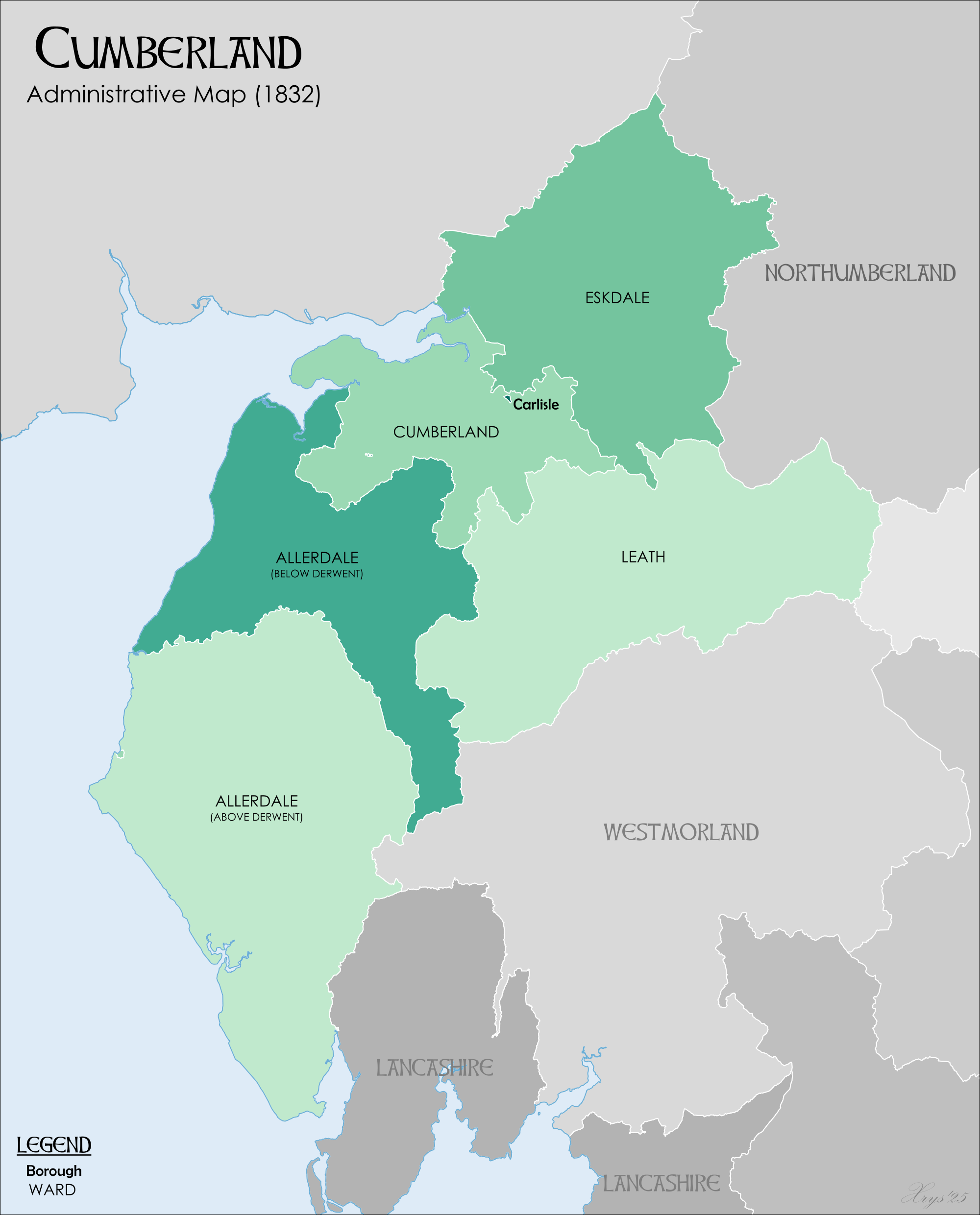
Hundreds of Cumberland in 1832

Cumberland was divided into wards, analogous to hundreds.

- Allerdale-above-Derwent
- Allerdale-below-Derwent
- Cumberland
- Eskdale
- Leath

== Derbyshire ==
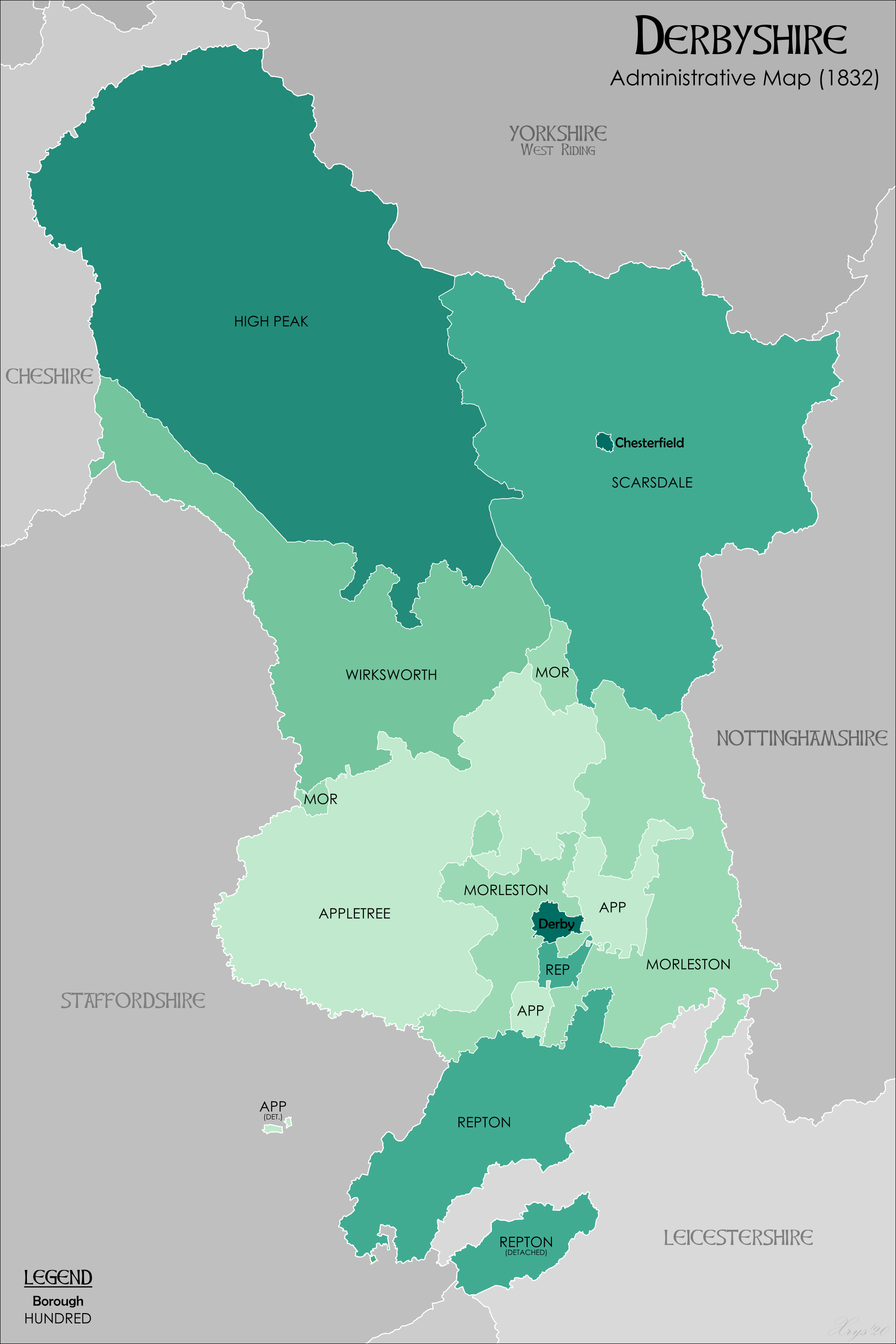
Map of the County of Derbyshire in 1832

The civil divisions of Derbyshire were anciently called wapentakes. In the Domesday Survey of 1086 are mentioned the wapentakes of Scarvedale, Hamestan, Morlestan, Walecross, and Apultre, and a district called Peche-fers. Divided into hundreds by 1273.:

- High Peak—Hamestan wapentake and perhaps Peche-fers district in 1086; Peck wapentake by 1273.
- Wirksworth—Called a wapentake as late as 1817.
- Scarsdale
- Morleston and Litchurch—Called in the Domesday Survey of 1086, Morlestan or Morleystone wapentake and Littlechurch wapentake, and in the Hundred-Roll of 1273, Littlechirch; by 1300 combined as the hundred of Morleston and Litchurch.
- Appletree
- Repton and Gresley—In 1274 formed the separate wapentakes of Repindon and Greselegh (owned by the King and the heirs of the Earl of Chester respectively); in 1086 the large Walecross wapentake.

== Devon ==
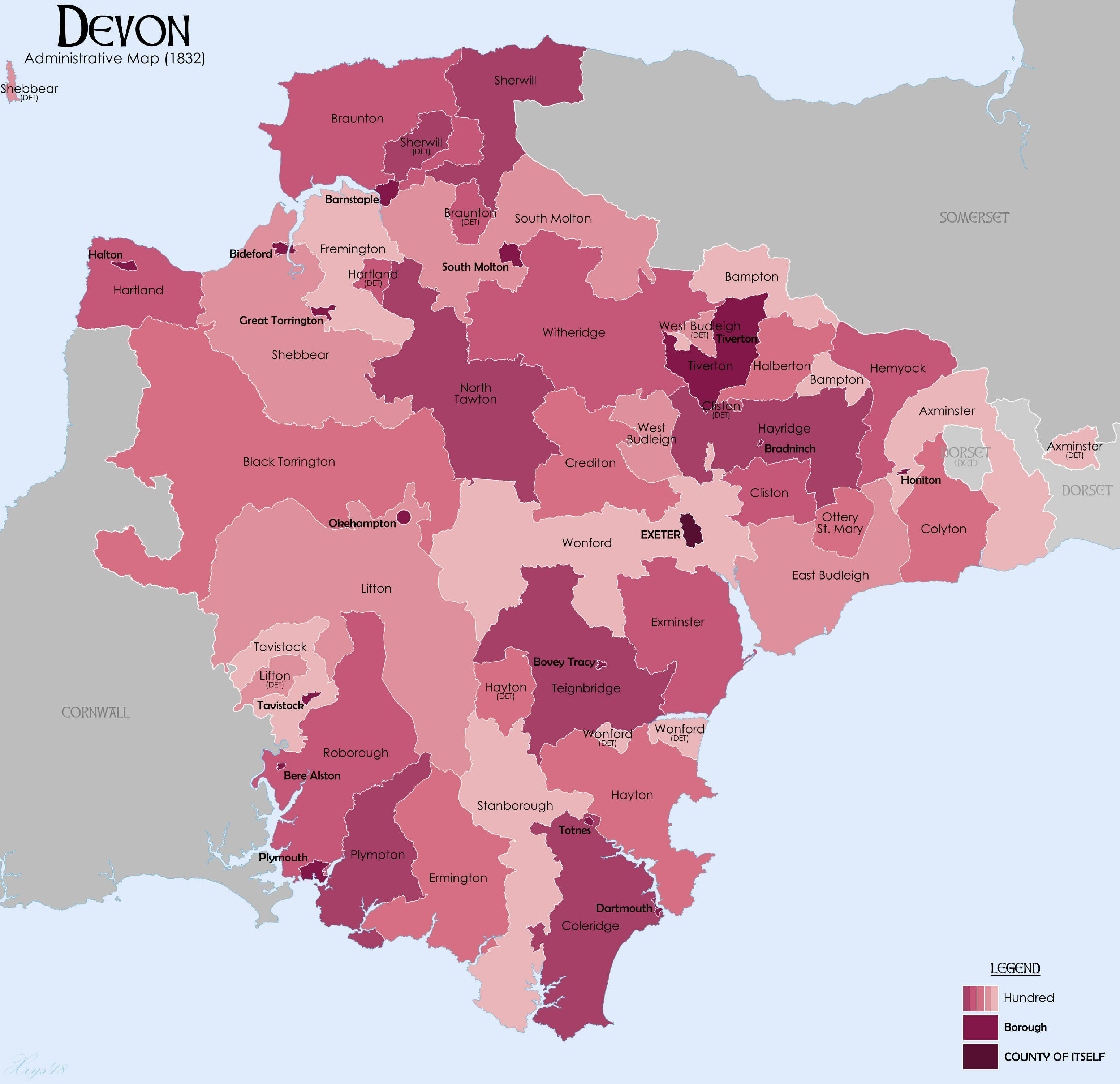
Devon Hundreds in 1832

In 1850 there were thirty-two hundreds in Devon according to White's History, Gazetteer, and Directory of Devonshire

- Axminster Hundred
- Bampton Hundred
- Black Torrington Hundred
- Braunton Hundred
- Cliston Hundred
- Coleridge Hundred
- Colyton Hundred
- Crediton Hundred
- East Budleigh Hundred
- Ermington Hundred
- Exminster Hundred
- Fremington Hundred
- Halberton Hundred
- Hartland Hundred
- Hayridge Hundred
- Haytor Hundred
- Hemyock Hundred
- Lifton Hundred
- North Tawton and Winkleigh Hundred
- Ottery Hundred
- Plympton Hundred
- Roborough Hundred
- Shebbear Hundred
- Shirwell Hundred
- South Molton Hundred
- Stanborough Hundred
- Tavistock Hundred
- Teignbridge Hundred
- Tiverton Hundred
- West Budleigh Hundred
- Witheridge Hundred
- Wonford Hundred

== Dorset ==
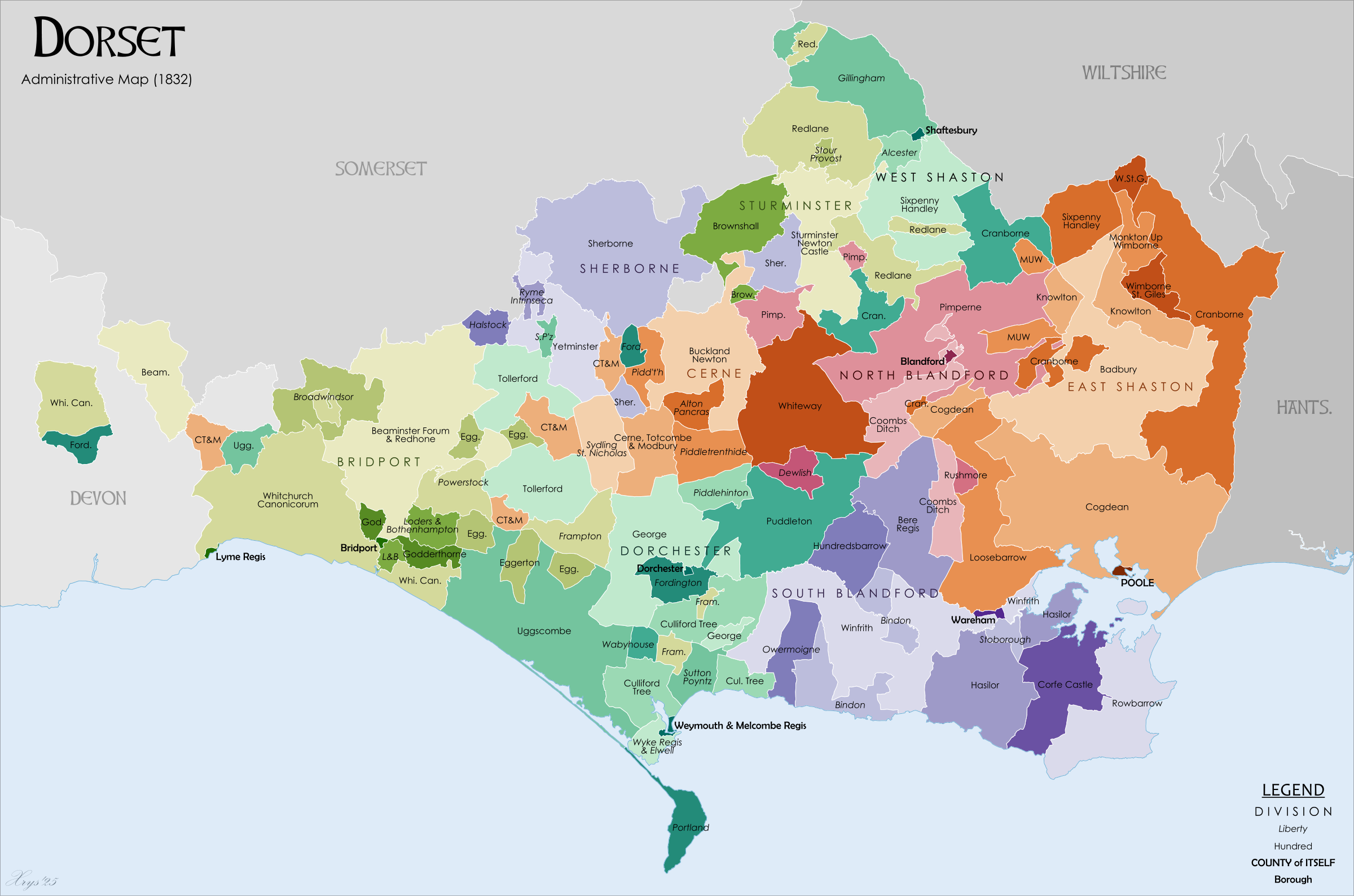
Dorset Hundreds in 1834

- Alvredesberge (dissolved post 1086)
- Badbury
- Beaminster Forum and Redhone
- Bere Regis
- Brownshall
- Buckland Newton
- Cerne, Totcombe and Modbury
- Cogdean
- Coombs Ditch
- Corfe Castle
- Cranborne
- Culliford Tree
- Eggerton (also Eggarton)
- Godderthorne
- Hasler (also Hasilor)
- Hundredsbarrow (also Barrow)
- Knowlton
- Loosebarrow
- Monkton Up Wimborne (also Up Wimborne)
- Pimperne
- Puddletown
- Redlane (also Redland)
- Rowbarrow (also Rowberrow)
- Rushmore
- St George's (also George)
- Sherborne
- Sixpenny Handley
- Sturminster Newton
- Tollerford
- Uggescombe
- Whitchurch Canonicorum
- Whiteway
- Wimborne St Giles
- Winfrith
- Yetminster

There was also Loders and Bothenhampton Liberty

== County Durham ==
County Durham was divided into wards, analogous to hundreds. From an 1840 map of County Durham Genuki: Co Durham in 1840, Durham.

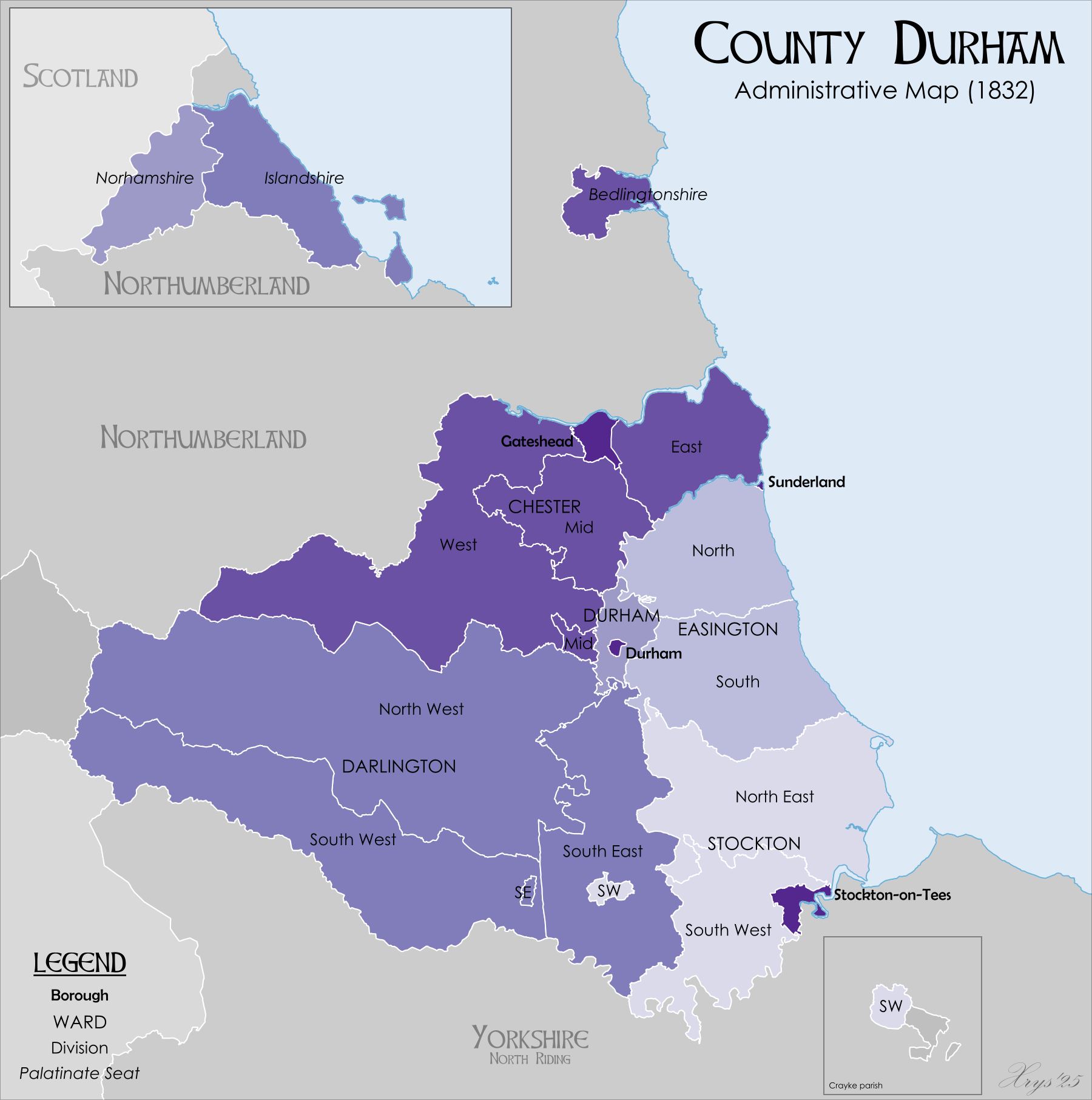
County Durham Wards in 1832

- Chester
- Darlington
- Durham City
- Easington
- Stockton

== Essex ==
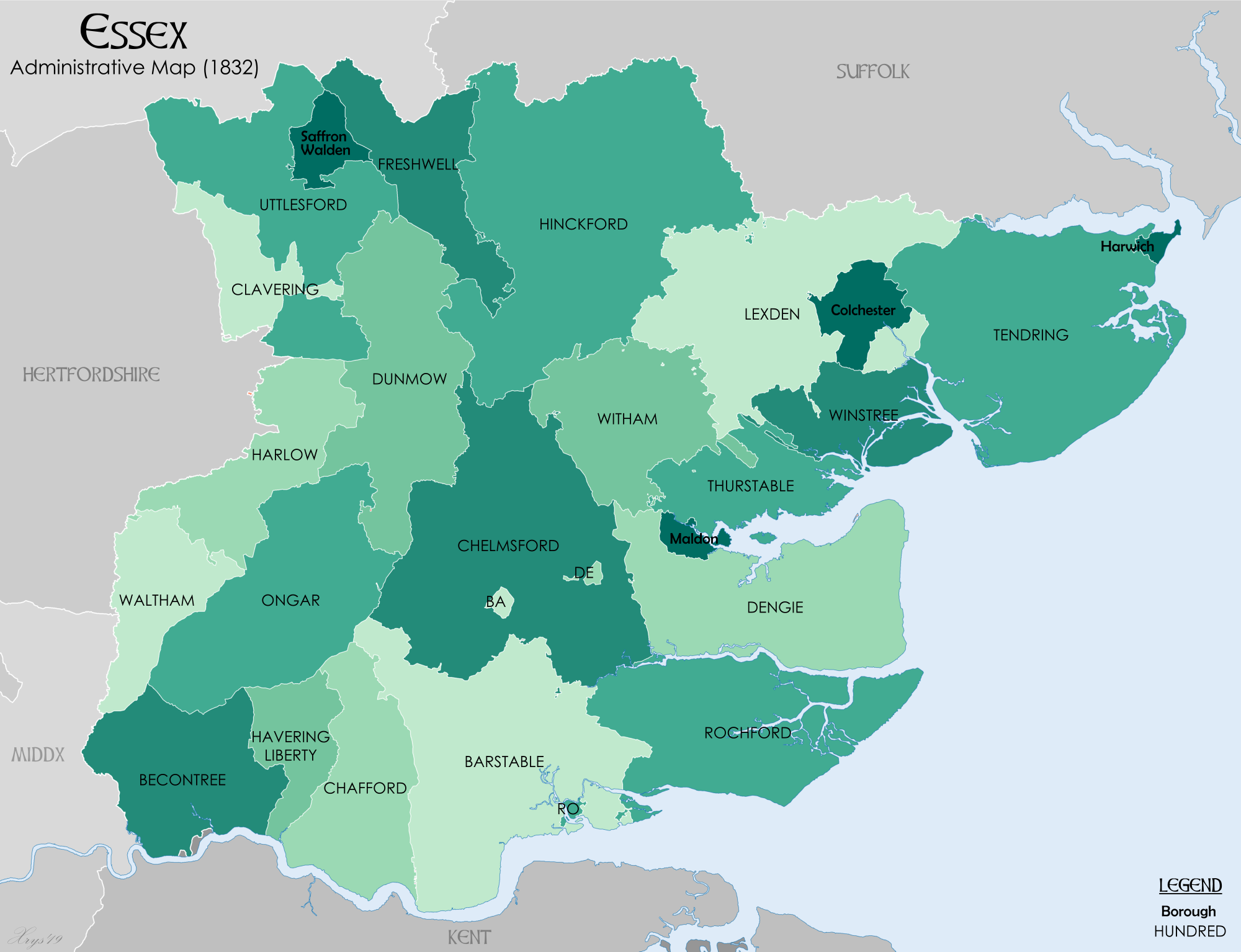
Essex Hundreds in 1832

- Barstable (sometimes spelled Barnstable)
- Becontree
- Chafford
- Chelmsford
- Clavering
- Dengie, known at the time of Domesday as Witbrictesherna (Wibrihtesherne) Hundred
- Dunmow
- Freshwell
- Harlow
- Liberty of Havering, also sometimes known as Romford Hundred
- Hinckford
- Lexden
- Ongar
- Rochford
- Tendring
- Thurstable
- Uttlesford
- Waltham
- Winstree
- Witham

According to essex1841.com Hundreds in the Essex 1841 census the 1841 census also recorded Harwich hundred, which the Victoria County History places within Tendring.

== Gloucestershire ==
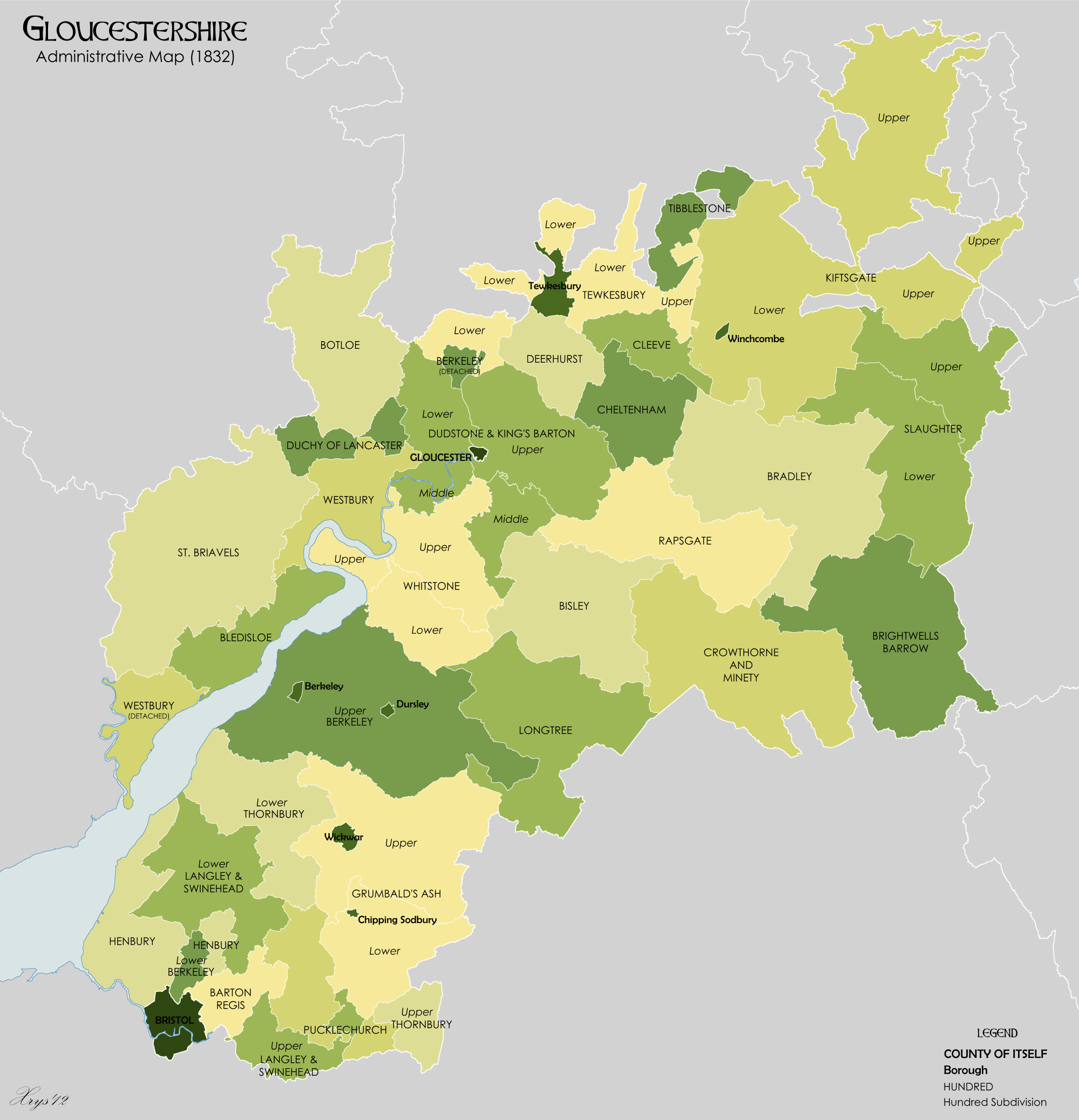
Gloucestershire Hundreds in 1832

The thirty-nine hundreds mentioned in the Domesday Survey and the thirty-one hundreds of the Hundred Rolls of 1274 differ very widely in name and extent both from each other and from the twenty-eight hundreds of the present day. From the National Gazetteer of Britain and Ireland Genuki: Miscellaneous Places, Gloucestershire, Gloucestershire

- Barton Regis
- Berkeley
- Bishop's Cleeve
- Bisley
- Bledisloe
- Botloe
- Bradley
- Brightwell's Barrow
- Cheltenham
- Cleeve
- Crowthorne-with-Minety
- Deerhurst
- Dudstone (upper, middle and lower divisions)
- Grumbalds Ash
- Henbury
- Kiftsgate (upper and lower divisions)
- Langley and Swinehead
- Longtree
- Lower Slaughter
- Lower Tewkesbury
- Lower Thornbury
- Pucklechurch
- Rapsgate
- St Briavels
- Tibaldstone
- Upper Slaughter
- Upper Tewkesbury
- Upper Thornbury
- Westbury
- Westminster
- Whitstone (upper and lower divisions) – absorbed the Blacklow hundred by 1220.

The Duchy of Lancaster (Gloucestershire) liberty was sometimes counted as a hundred.

== Hampshire ==
The Domesday Survey mentions 44 hundreds in Hampshire, recorded as HanteScire and abbreviated as Hante. By the 14th century the number had been reduced to 37. The hundreds of East Medina and West Medina in the Isle of Wight are mentioned in 1316. The Isle of Wight obtained a county council of its own in 1890 and became a full ceremonial county in 1974.

Hampshire has in the past been named Southamptonshire and is so recorded in the Commonwealth Instrument of Government, 1653. The name of the administrative county was changed from 'County of Southampton' to 'County of Hampshire' on 1 April 1959. The short form of the name, often used in postal addresses, is Hants.

The 44 Domesday-era hundreds were: Amesbury, Andover, Ashley, Barton, Basingstoke, Bermondspit, Bosbarrow, Bosham, Bountisborough, Bowcombe, Brightford, Broughton, Buddlesgate, Calbourne, Chalton, Charldon, Chuteley, Crondall, Droxford, East Meon, Edgegate, Evingar, Falemere, Fareham, Farringdon, Fawley, Fordingbridge, Hoddington, Holdshott, Hurstbourne, Kingsclere, Mansbridge, Meonstoke, Micheldever, Neatham, Odiham, Overton, Portsdown, Redbridge, Ringwood, Somborne, Titchfield, Waltham, Welford

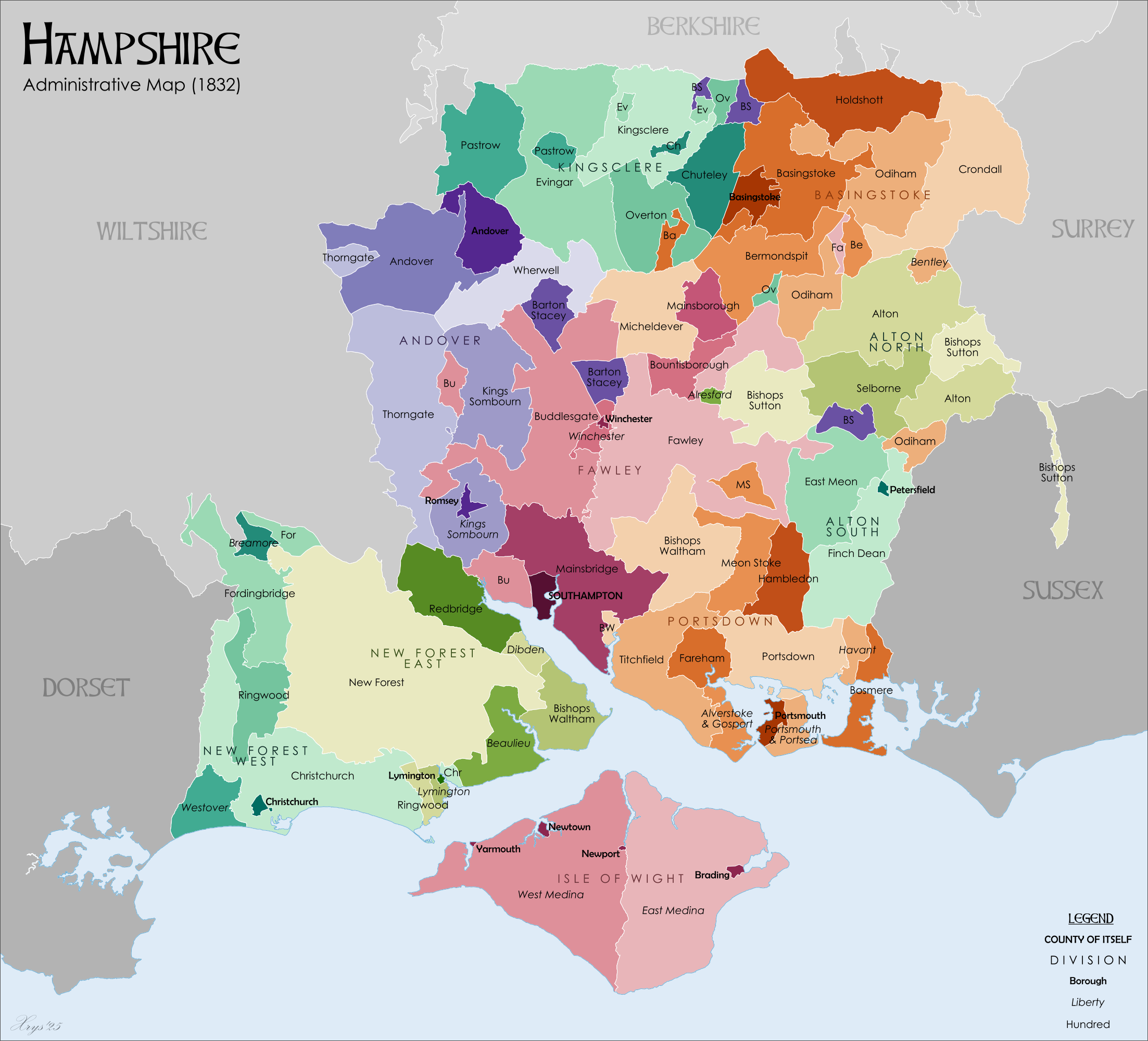
Hampshire Hundreds in 1832

In the 19th century, the hundreds were listed as:

- Alton
- Andover
- Barton Stacey
- Basingstoke
- Bermondspit
- Bishop's Sutton
- Bishop's Waltham
- Bosmere
- Bountisborough
- Buddlesgate
- Christchurch
- Chuteley
- Crondall
- East Medina (also described as a liberty)
- East Meon
- Evingar
- Fareham
- Fawley
- Finchdean
- Fordingbridge
- Hambledon
- Holdshot
- Kingsclere
- King's Somborne
- Mainsborough
- Mansbridge
- Meonstoke
- Micheldever
- New Forest
- Odiham
- Overton
- Pastrow
- Portsdown
- Redbridge
- Ringwood
- Selborne
- Thorngate
- Titchfield
- West Medina (also described as a liberty)
- Wherwell

== Herefordshire ==
The hundreds mentioned in the Domesday Survey and the hundreds of the Hundred Rolls of 1274 differ very widely in name and extent both from each other and from the ten hundreds of the present day. Not included in the hundreds of Herefordshire at the time of Domesday, the sparsely populated Welch area of Archenfield included Ashe Ingen, Baysham and Kings Caple.

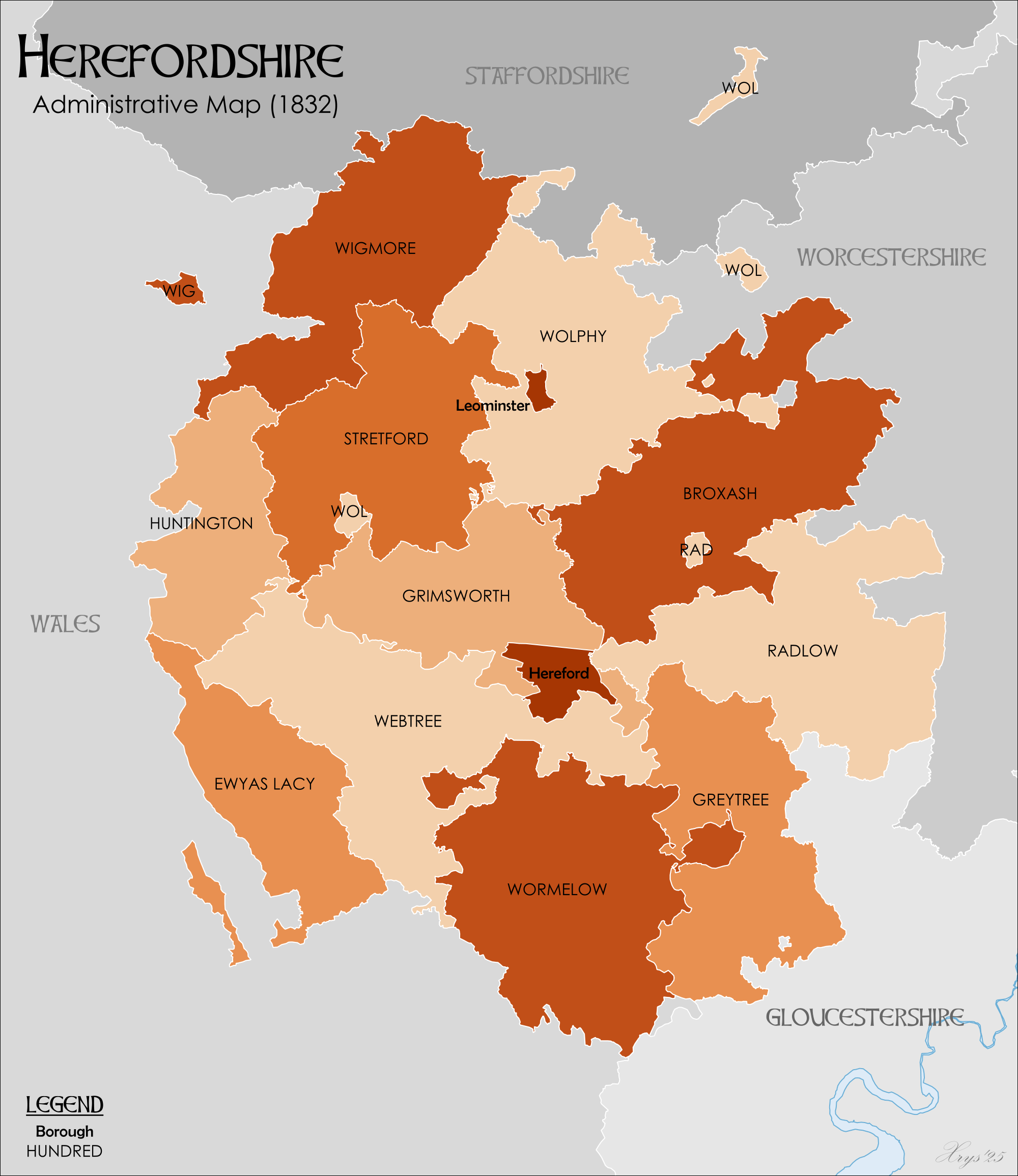
Hundreds of Herefordshire in 1832

From Domesday (1086)

- Bromsash
- Castlery
- Cutestornes
- Dinedor
- Ewias
- Greitrewes
- Hazeltree – Hezetre
- Plegelgete
- Radlow
- Sellack
- Stradel
- Tornelaus

From The National Gazetteer of Britain and Ireland (1868)
Genuki: Miscellaneous Places, Herefordshire, Herefordshire

- Broxash
- Ewyas-Lacy
- Greytree
- Grimsworth
- Huntington
- Radlow
- Stretford
- Webtree
- Wigmore
- Wolphy
- Wormelow (upper and lower divisions)

== Hertfordshire ==
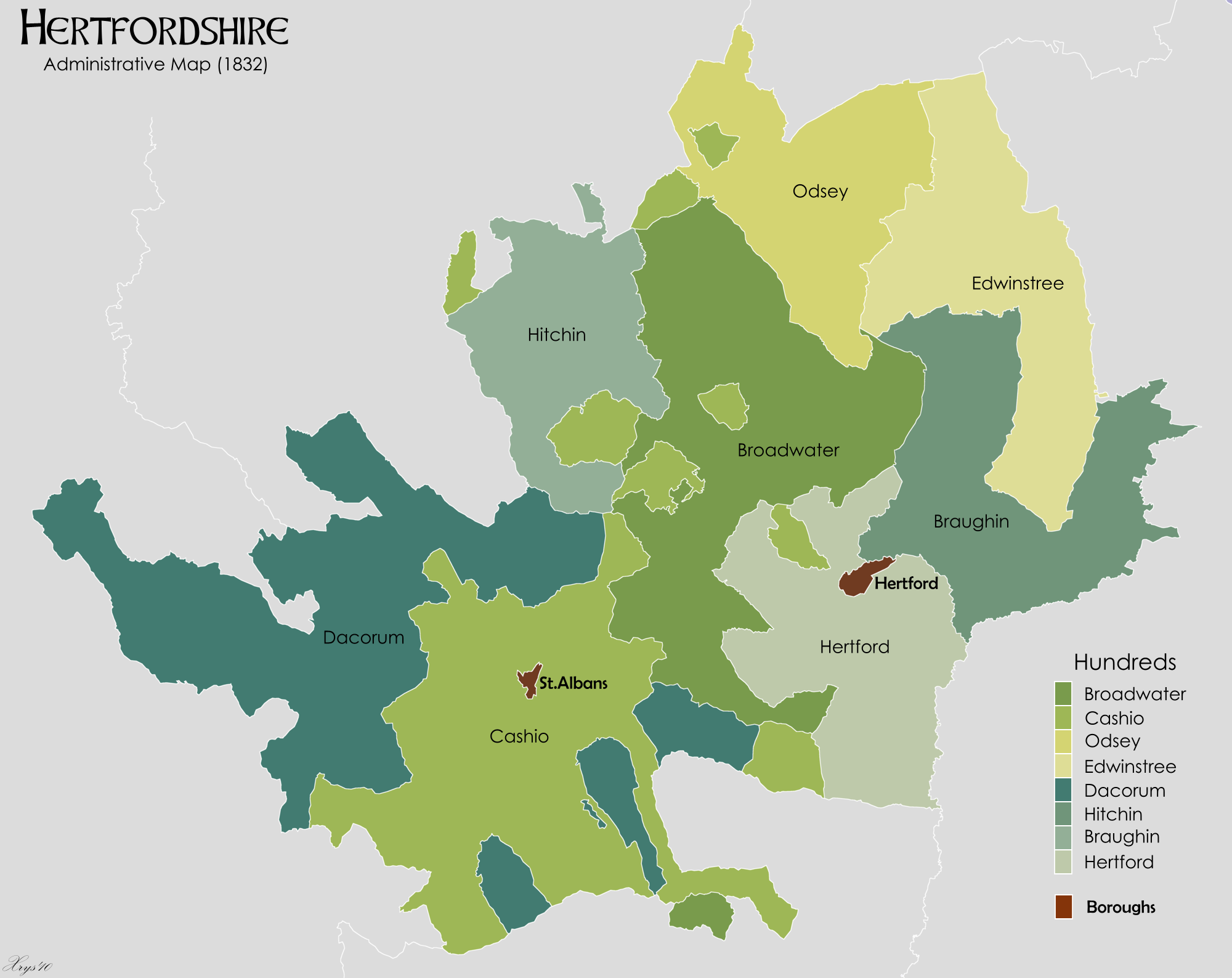
Hertfordshire Hundreds in 1832

(Danais & Tring added as per History of Hertfordshire)

- Braughing
- Broadwater
- Cashio (Previously known as St Albans Hundred)
- Dacorum
- Danais (merged with Tring to form Dacorum)
- Edwinstree
- Hertford
- Hitchin
- Odsey
- Tring (merged with Danais to form Dacorum)

== Huntingdonshire ==
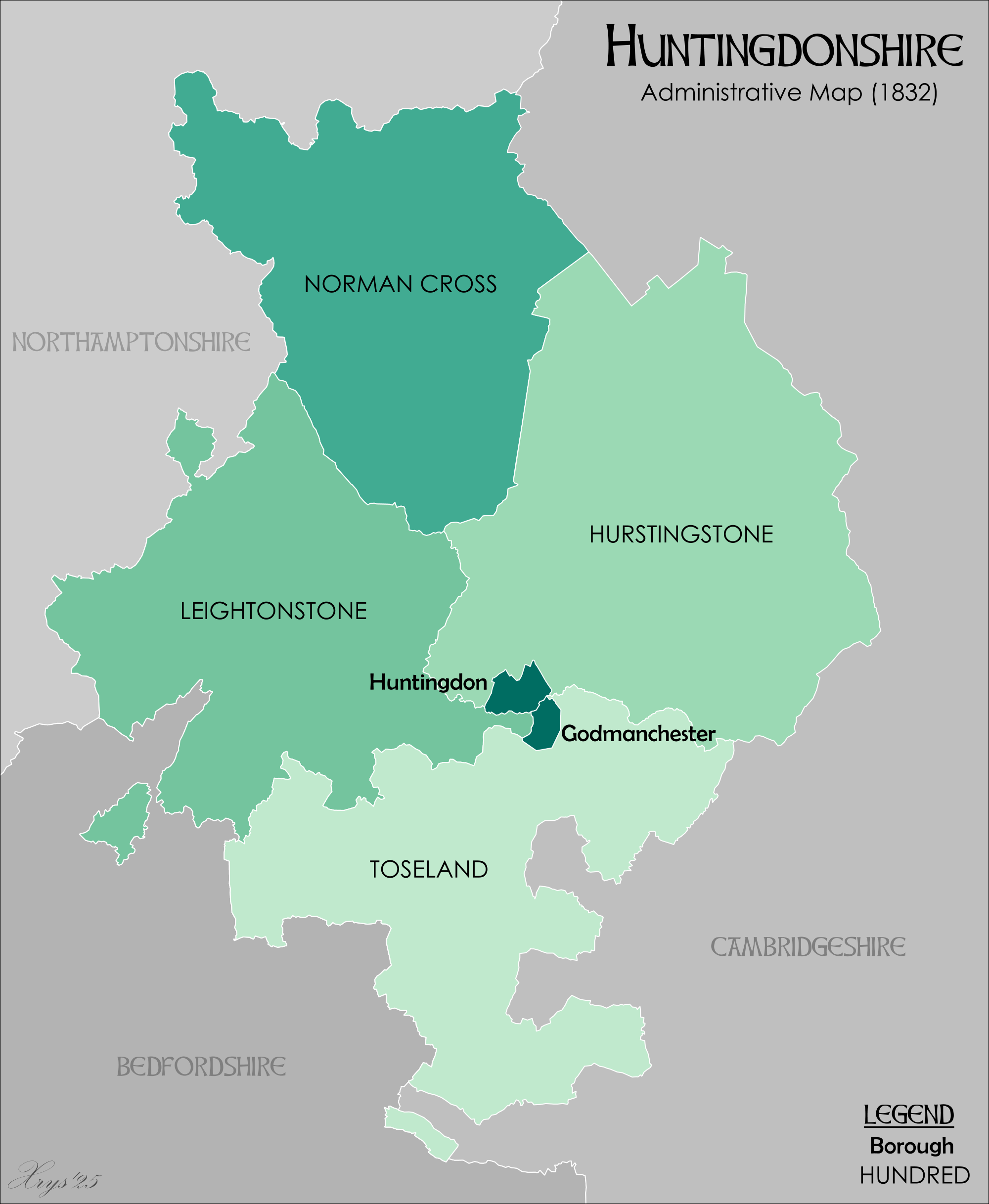
Huntingdonshire Hundreds in 1832

- Hurstingstone
- Leightonstone
- Norman Cross
- Toseland

== Kent ==
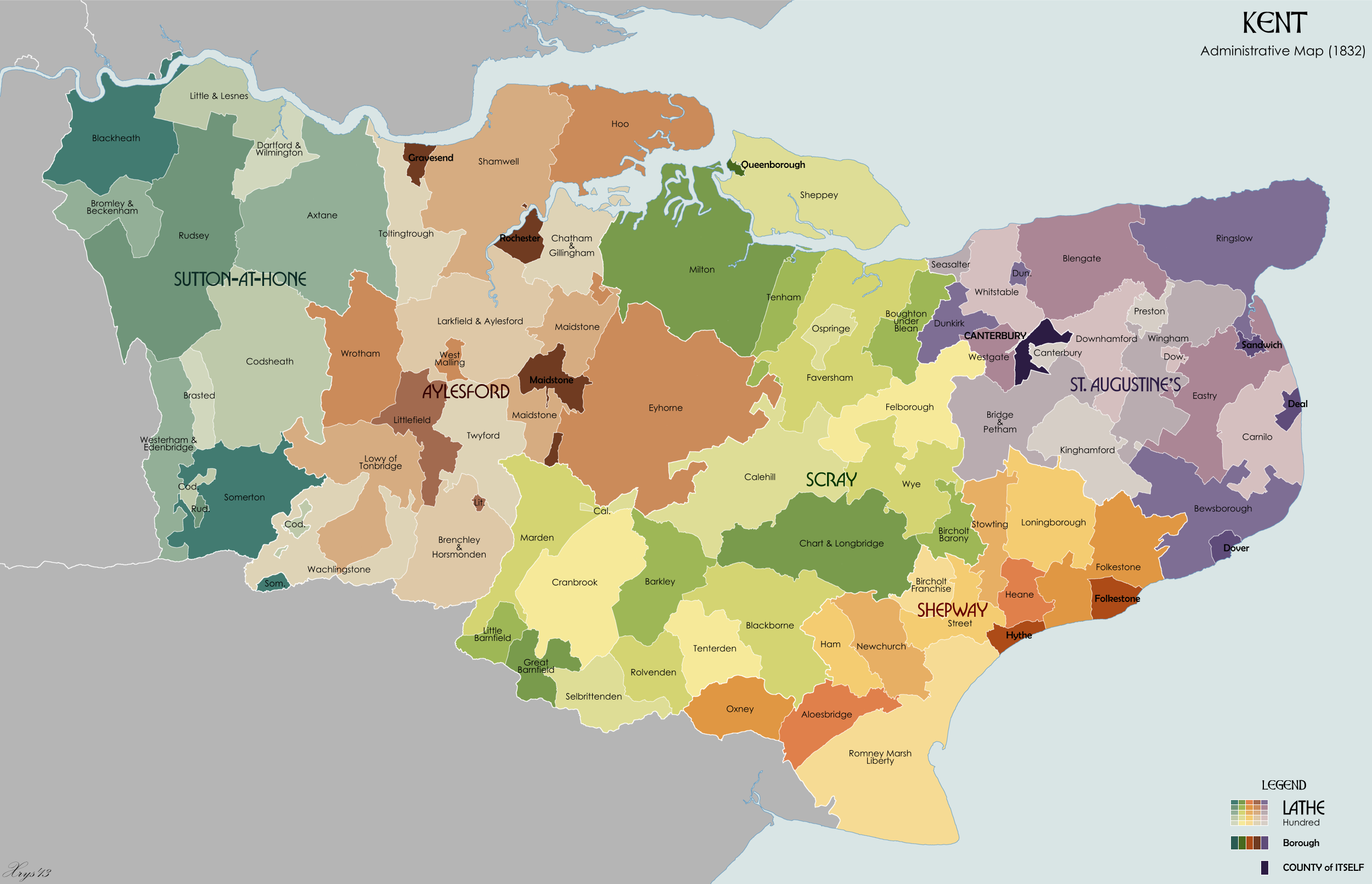
Kent Hundreds in 1832

From Kent Genealogy Kent Genealogy England. Early Medieval Kent was traditionally divided into East and West Kent, and into lathes and hundreds.

The hundreds contained parishes and portions of parishes. In many regions of England as well as Kent, an entire parish would be within one hundred, yet especially along rivers and estuaries which had previously seen invasion, the Kentish hundreds were smaller in area and "shared" parishes to institutionalize resiliency and collective responsibility for defence and justice.

=== East Kent ===
Lathe of St. Augustine

- Bewsborough (Bewsbury)
- Blengate
- Bridge and Petham
- Cornilo (Corniloe)
- Downhamford
- Eastry
- Kinghamford
- Preston
- Ringslow
- Westgate
- Whitstaple (the former spelling of Whitstable)
- Wingham

Lathe of Scraye

Lathe of Scraye formed by mid-1200s from the half lathe of Milton (which consisted of the hundred of Milton and the Isle of Sheppey) and the Lathe of Wye (which consisted of the Isle of Harty (which is conjoined to the Isle of Sheppey)) and many additional hundreds.

- Boughton under Blean (Boughton)
- Calehill
- Chart and Longbridge
- Faversham (included the Isle of Harty)
- Felborough
- Milton
- Teynham (included the parish of Eastchurch on the Isle of Sheppey)
- Wye

Due to a judicial administrative reform in the mid-19th century, the some hundreds of the Lathe of Scray were moved from East Kent administration to West Kent administration:

- Barkley
- Blackborne (Blackbourne)
- Cranbrook
- East Barnfield
- Marden
- Rolvenden
- Selbrittenden
- Tenterden

Lathe of Shepway

- Aloesbridge
- Bircholt
- Folkestone
- Ham
- Heane
- Langport (Longport)
- Loningborough
- Newchurch
- Oxney
- St Martin Pountney
- Stowting (Stouting)
- Strete (the former spelling of Street)
- Worth

The Lathe of Shepway also included the Cinque Port Liberty of New Romney in Romney Marsh, with the parish of Lydd as a limb of the Liberty.

=== West Kent ===
Lathe of Sutton at Hone

- Axstane/Axtane/Axton
- Blackheath
- Bromley and Beckenham
- Codsheath
- Dartford and Wilmington
- Little and Lessness
- Ruxley
- Somerden
- Westerham

Lathe of Aylesford

- Barnfield
- Brenchley and Horsmonden
- Chatham and Gillingham
- Eyhorne
- Hoo
- Larkfield
- Littlefield
- Maidstone
- Shamwell
- Toltingtrough
- Twyford
- Washlingstone
- Wrotham

plus the Lowey of Tonbridge

Lathe of Scraye (part)

In 1857 the provisions of the Act of 9 Geo. IV were invoked to re-examine the whole structure of Lathes and their divisions in providing for the administration of justice. The Lower Division of the Lathe of Scray, which formed the southernmost part of the Lathe, became part of West Kent, and consisted of the following Hundreds:

- Barkley
- Blackborne
- Cranbrook
- East Barnfield
- Marden
- Rolvenden
- Selbrittenden
- Tenterden

== Lancashire ==
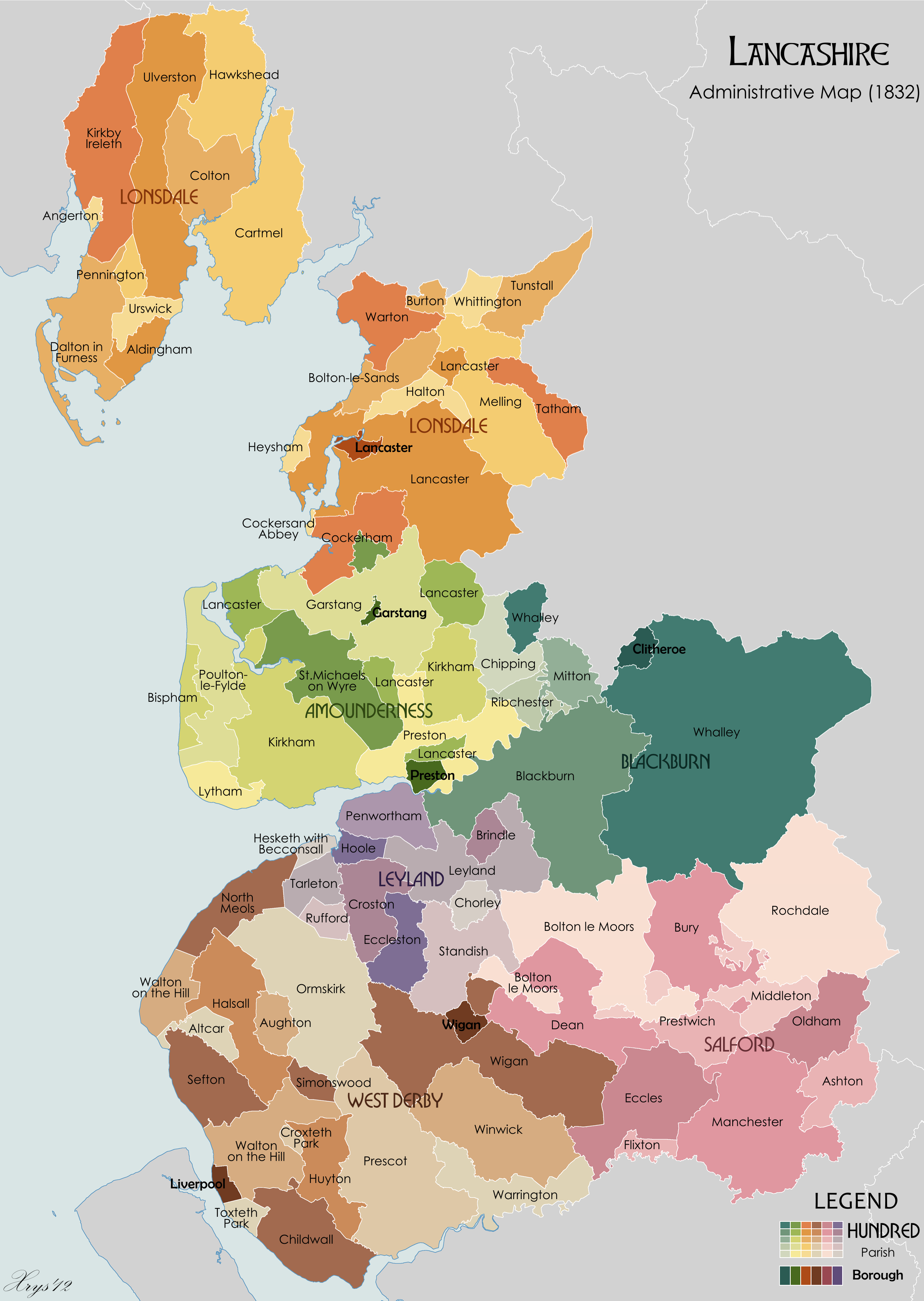
Lancashire Hundreds in 1834

- Amounderness
- Blackburn
- Leyland
- Lonsdale
- Salford
- West Derby

== Leicestershire ==
Leicestershire was originally divided into four wapentakes, but these were usually later described as hundreds. From the 1911 Encyclopædia Britannica after 1346 the six hundreds were:

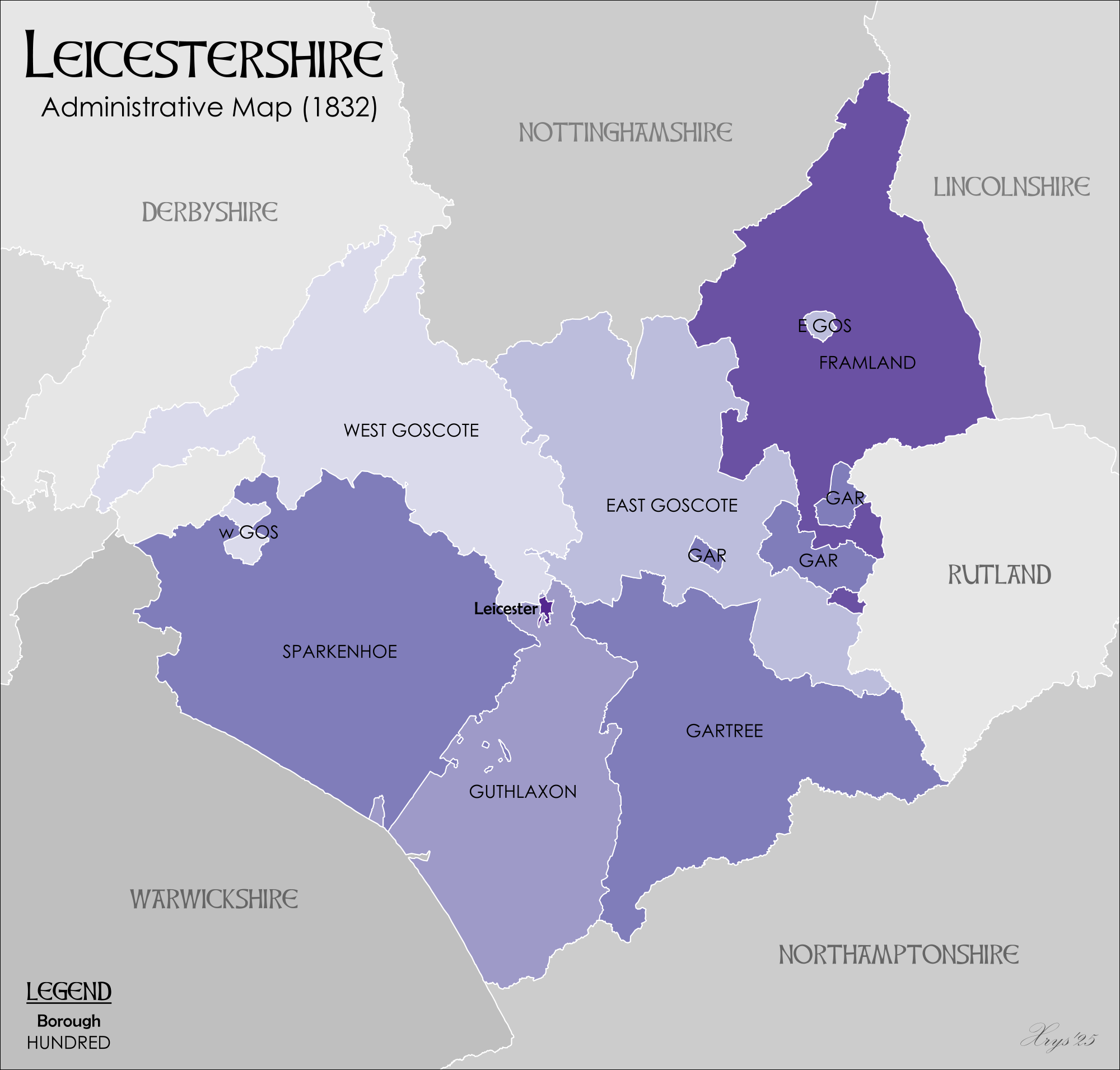
Hundreds of Leicestershire in 1832

- East Goscote
- Framland
- Gartree
- Guthlaxton
- Sparkenhoe
- West Goscote

In the Domesday Book, West Goscote and East Goscote made up just Goscote and Sparkenhoe did not yet exist. The division which brought East and West Goscote and Sparkenhoe into existence was made in 1346.

== Lincolnshire ==
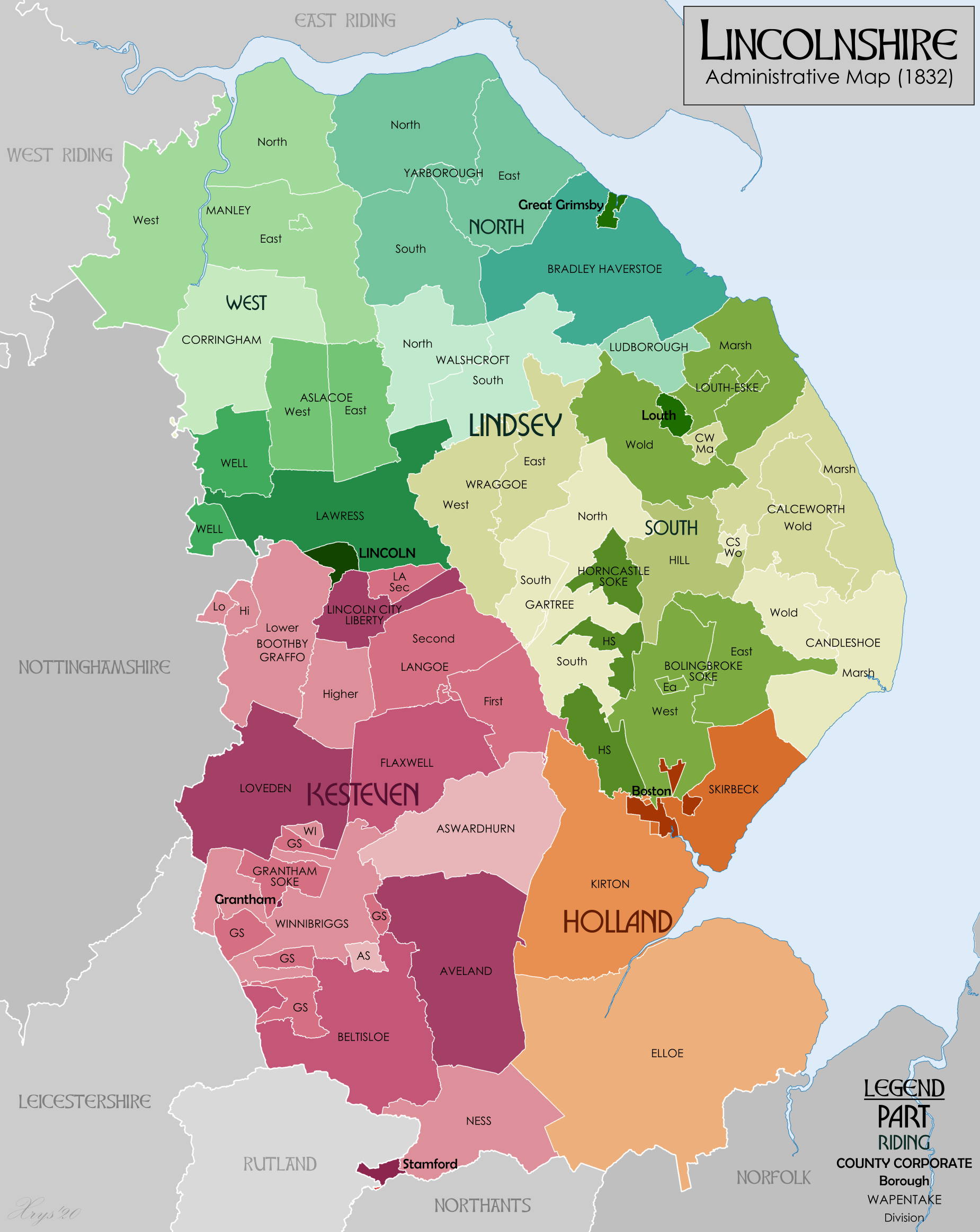
Lincolnshire Wapentakes in 1832

Lincolnshire was divided into three Parts, each of which was divided into wapentakes, analogous to hundreds.

From map on Lincolnshire County Council website:

Parts of Holland

- Elloe
- Kirton
- Skirbeck

Parts of Kesteven

- Aswardhurn
- Aveland
- Boothby Graffoe (Higher and Lower divisions)
- Beltisloe
- Flaxwell
- Langoe (First and Second divisions)
- Loveden
- Ness
- Winnibriggs and Threo (wapentake)

Parts of Lindsey
North Riding of Lindsey

- Bradley-Haverstoe
- Ludborough
- Walshcroft (North and South divisions)
- Yarborough

South Riding of Lindsey

- Calceworth (Marsh and Wold divisions)
- Candleshoe (Marsh and Wold divisions)
- Gartree (North and South divisions)
- Hill
- Louth-Eske (Marsh and Wold divisions)
- Wraggoe (East and West divisions)

West Riding of Lindsey

- Aslacoe (East and West divisions)
- Corringham
- Epworth (compare Isle of Axholme)
- Manley (East, North, and West divisions)
- Lawress
- Well

== Middlesex ==
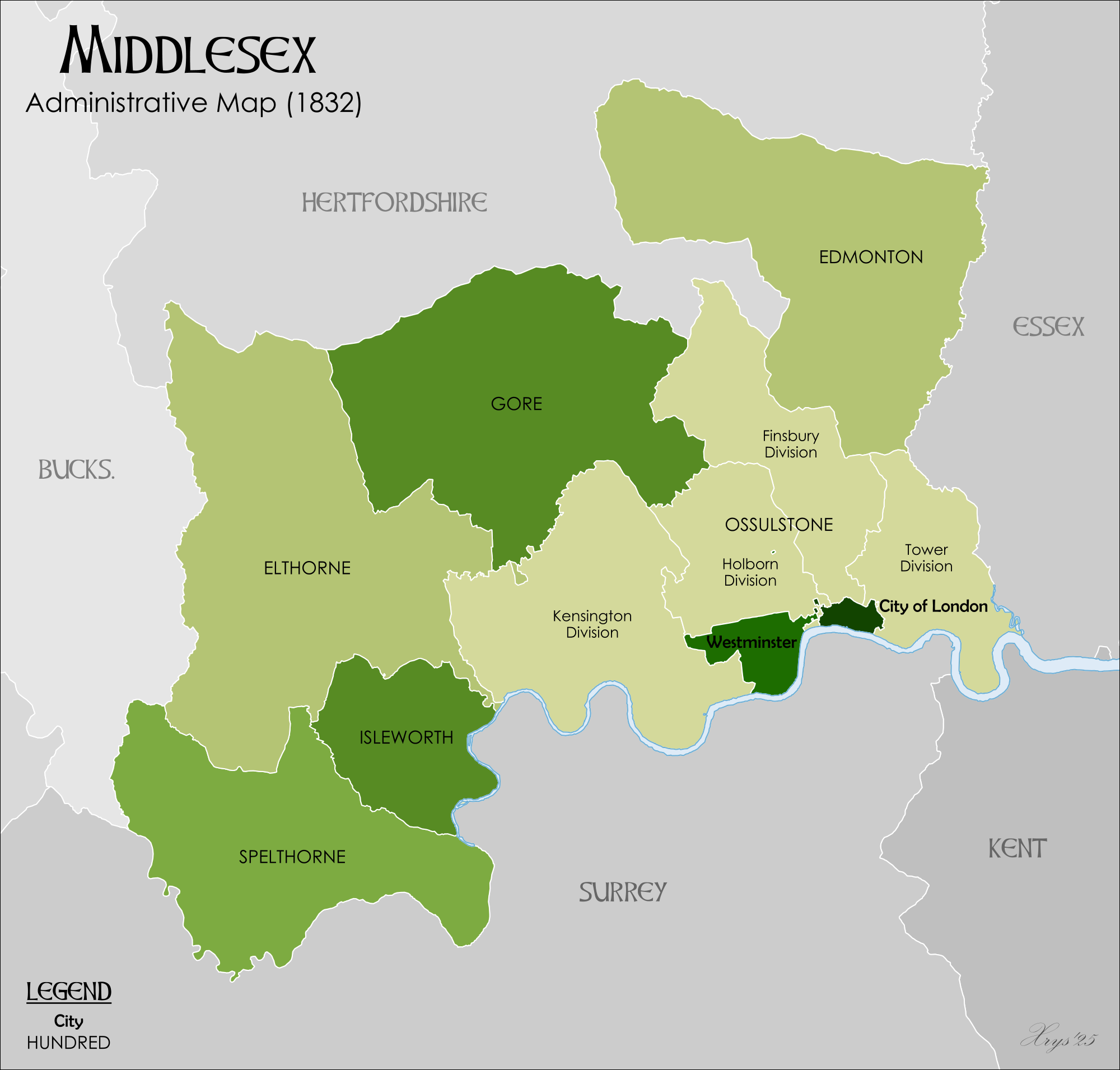
Hundreds of Middlesex in 1832

- Edmonton
- Elthorne
- Gore
- Isleworth (recorded in 1086 as Hounslow)
- Ossulstone
- Spelthorne

== Norfolk ==
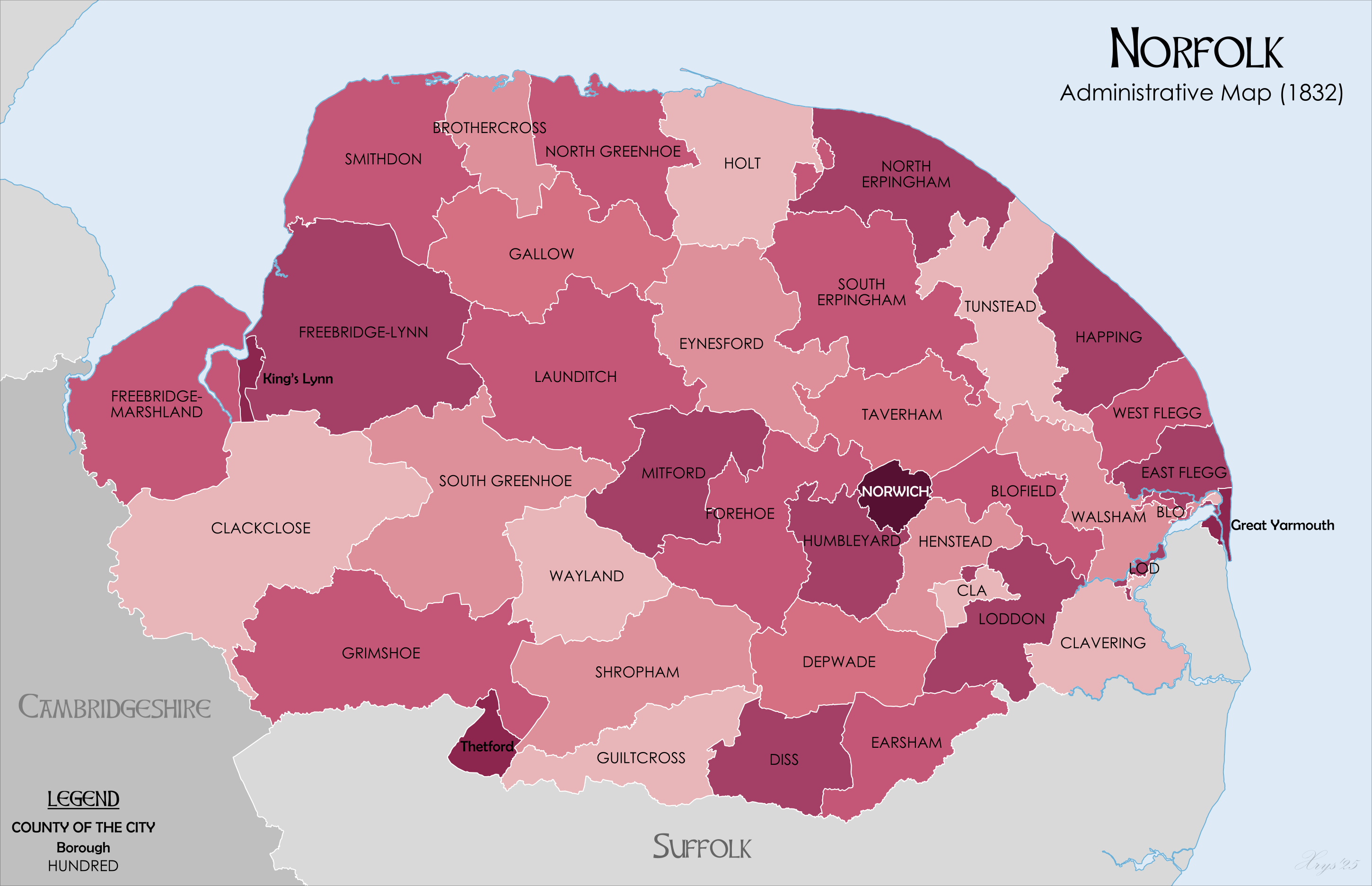
Hundreds of Norfolk in 1832

- Blofield
- Brothercross
- Clackclose
- Clavering
- Depwade
- Diss
- Earsham
- East Flegg
- Eynesford
- Forehoe
- Freebridge-Lynn
- Freebridge-Marshland
- Gallow
- Grimshoe
- Guiltcross
- Happing
- Henstead
- Holt
- Humbleyard
- Launditch
- Loddon
- Mitford
- North Erpingham
- North Greenhoe
- Shropham
- Smithdon
- South Erpingham
- South Greenhoe
- Taverham
- Tunstead
- Walsham
- Wayland
- West Flegg

== Northamptonshire ==
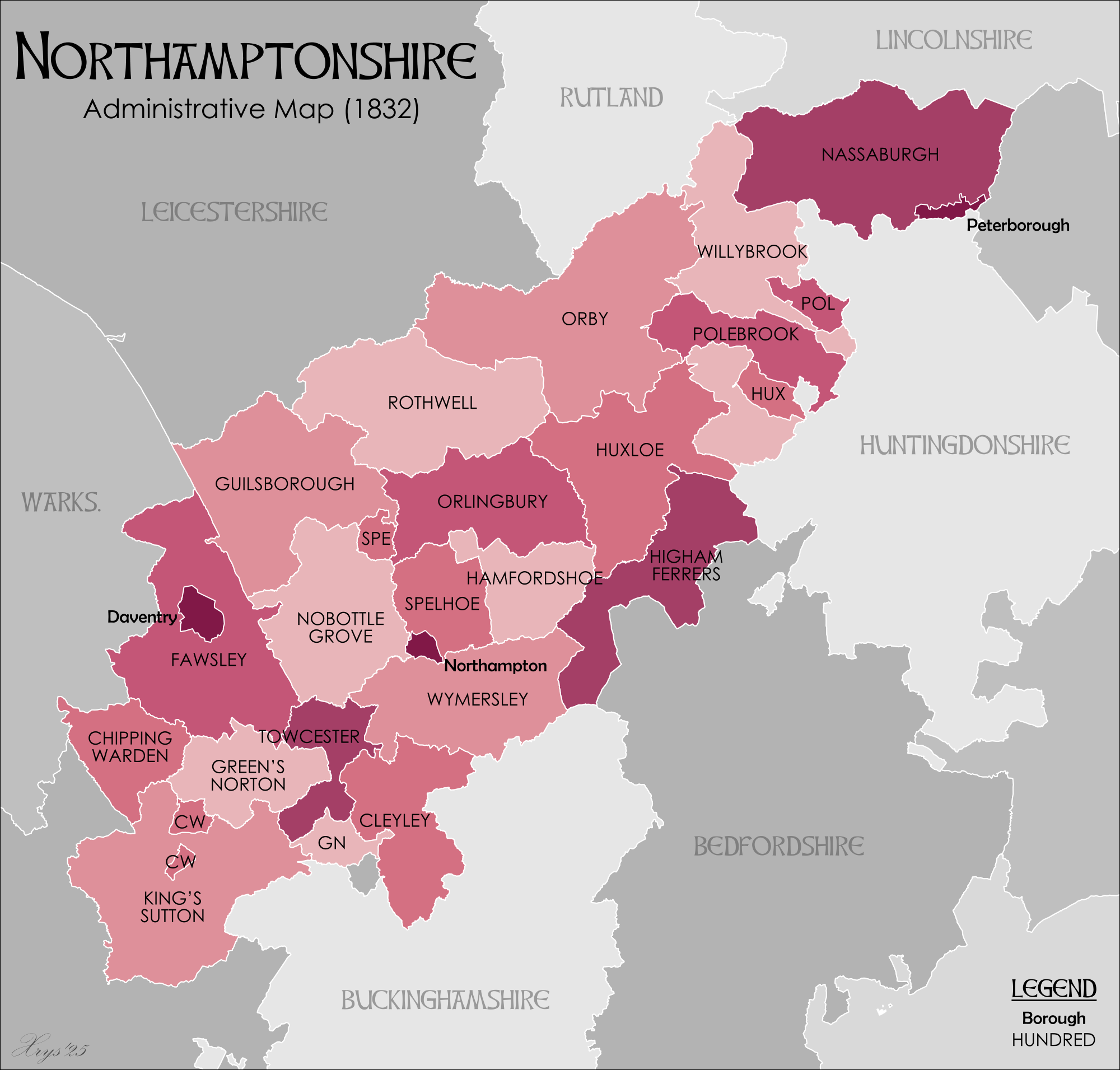
Northamptonshire Hundreds in 1832

In 1086, there were 39 hundreds in the county: Alboldstow, Alwardsley, Barcheston, Beltisloe, Bloxham, Bumbelowe, Cleyley, Coleshill, Collingtree, Corby, Cuttlestone, Fawsley (Foxley), Gravesend (later absorbed into Fawsley Hundred), Guilsborough, Hamfordshoe, Higham, Hunesberi, Huxloe, Kirtlington, Mawsley, Navisford, Navisland, Ness, Nobottle, Offlow, Orlingbury, Polebrook, Rothwell, Spelhoe, Stoke (By the time of the 'Nomina Villarum' a survey carried out in the first half of the 12th century, the Stoke Hundred had been absorbed into the Corby Hundred), Stotfold, Sutton, Towcester, Upton, Warden, Willybrook, Witchley, Wootton and Wymersley.

From the Northamptonshire Family History Society the hundreds in the 1800s are:

- Chipping Warden
- Cleyley
- Corby
- Fawsley
- Greens Norton
- Guilsborough
- Hamfordshoe
- Higham Ferrers
- Huxloe
- King's Sutton
- Nobottle Grove
- Orlingbury
- Polebrook
- Rothwell
- Spelhoe
- Towcester
- Willybrook
- Wymersley

The liberty and Soke of Peterborough was sometimes called Nassaburgh hundred.

== Northumberland ==
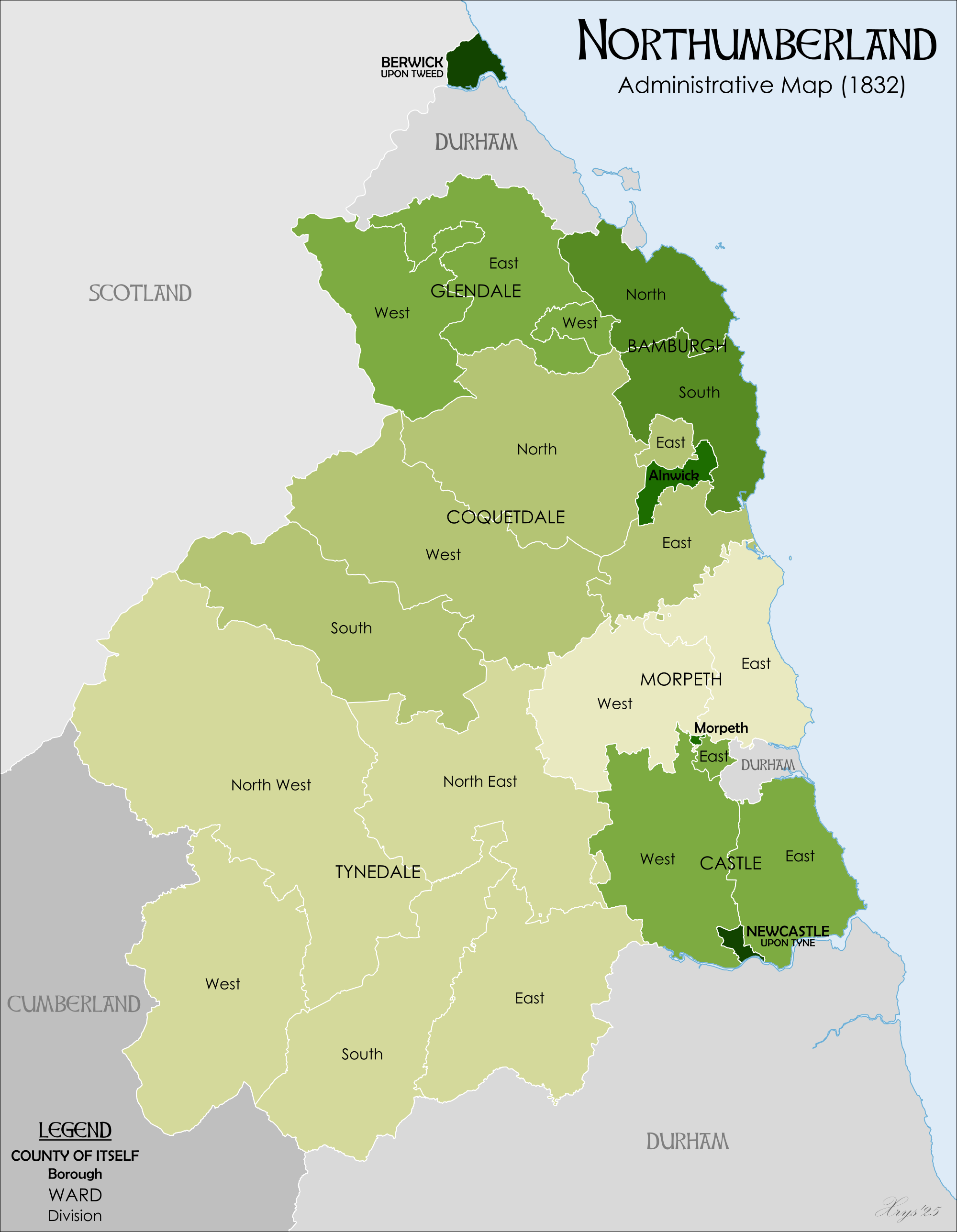
Northumberland Wards in 1832

Following the Harrying of the North and subsequent incursions from Scotland, the high sheriff of Northumberland was granted extraordinary powers. The county was subdivided into baronies, which were arranged in six wards and subdivided into constabularies. The wards were analogous to hundreds. From the National Gazetteer of Britain and Ireland (1868) GENUKI: The National Gazetteer of Great Britain and Ireland (1868) – Northumberland

- Bamburgh
- Castle
- Coquetdale
- Glendale
- Morpeth
- Tynedale

== Nottinghamshire ==
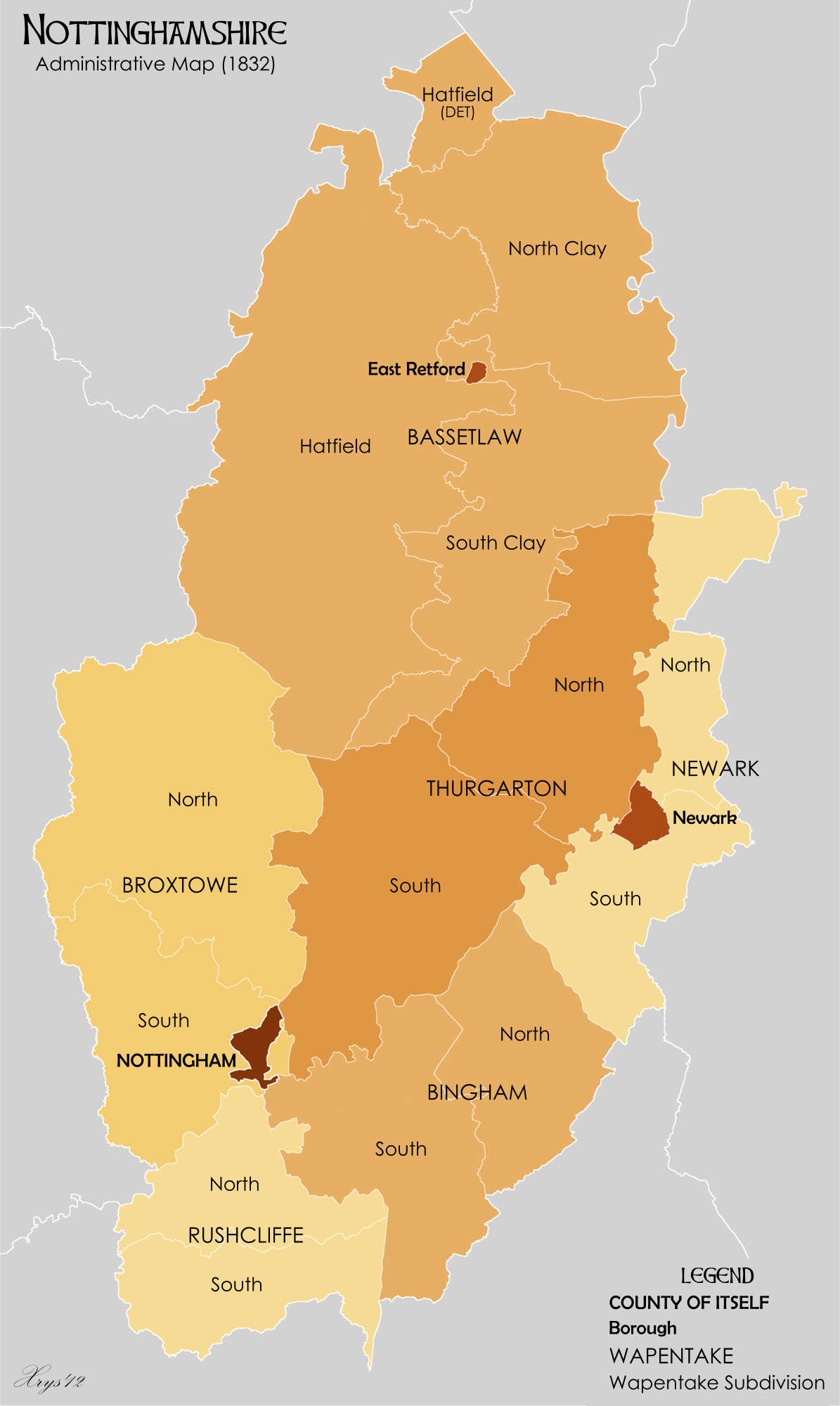
Nottinghamshire Wapentakes in 1832

Nottinghamshire was divided into wapentakes, analogous to hundreds. From the Thoroton Society of Nottinghamshire The Thoroton Society of Nottinghamshire: Nottinghamshire

- Bassetlaw (North Clay, South Clay and Hatfield divisions)
- Bingham (North and South divisions)
- Broxtowe (North and South divisions)
- Newark (North and South divisions)
- Rushcliffe (North and South divisions)
- Thurgarton (North and South divisions)

== Oxfordshire ==
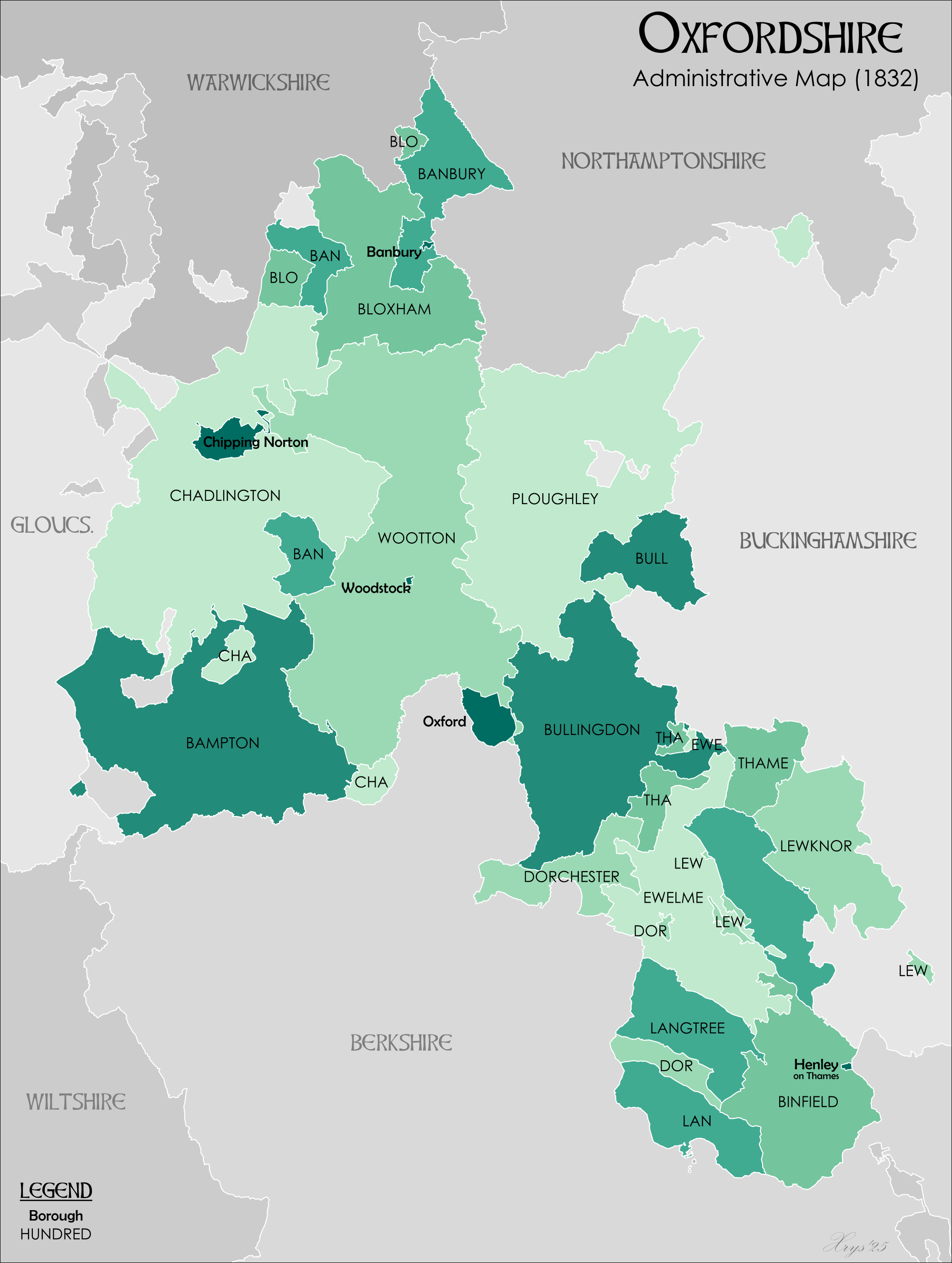
Hundreds of Oxfordshire in 1832

From

- Bampton
- Banbury
- Binfield
- Bloxham
- Bullingdon
- Chadlington
- Dorchester
- Ewelme (Known as Benson hundred in 1070)
- Kirtlington – A hundred at the time of Domesday, it was combined to form the major portion of Ploughley hundred by 1169.
- Langtree
- Lewknor
- Pyrton – Pirton is a later Latinised spelling.
- Ploughley – Name first mentioned in the form Pokedelawa hundred in the Pipe Roll of 1169.
- Thame
- Wootton – Includes the three hundreds dependent on the royal manor of Wootton in 1086 and sometimes called the "three hundreds of Wootton" in the later 12th century: Shipton hundred, (unknown name) hundred and pre-1086 Wootten hundred. The hundred was later divided into two administrative regions:
  - Wootton (Northern part) – 19 parishes including Barford St. Michael, Deddington, Glympton, Heythrop, Rousham, Sandford St. Martin, South Newington, Stonesfield, Tackley, Wootton, the Astons (North Aston and Steeple Aston), the Bartons (Steeple Barton and Westcott Barton), the Wortons (formed in 1932 by combining Nether Worton and Over Worton parishes), and the three Tews (Great Tew, Little Tew and Duns Tew).
  - Wootton (Southern part) – 15 parishes and several extraparochial places
  - Within Wootton hundred yet separately administered were the areas of Oxford City & University, Oxford City and Oxford Liberty.

== Rutland ==
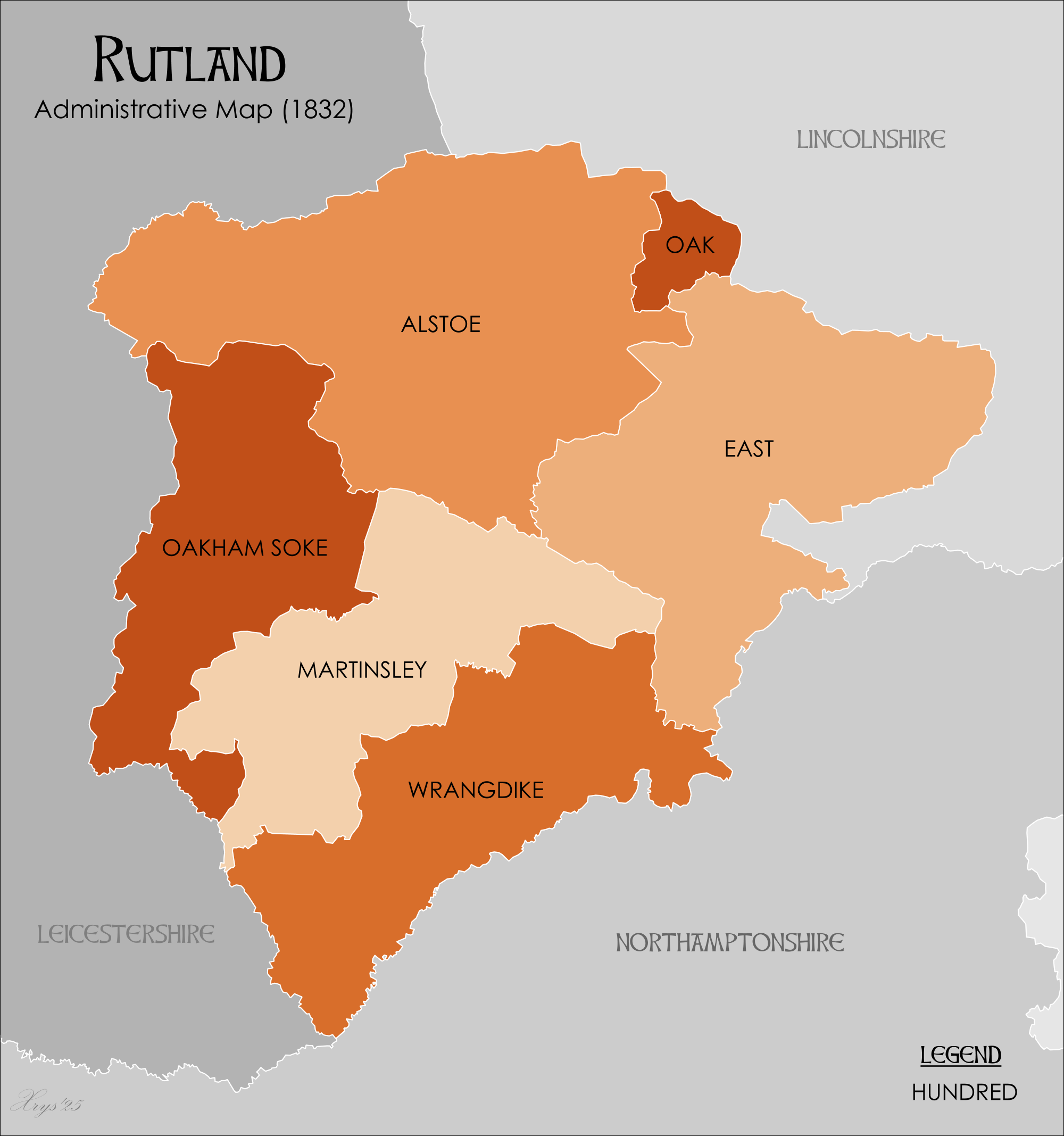
Hundreds of Rutland in 1832

- Alstoe
- East
- Martinsley
- Oakham
- Wrandike

== Shropshire ==
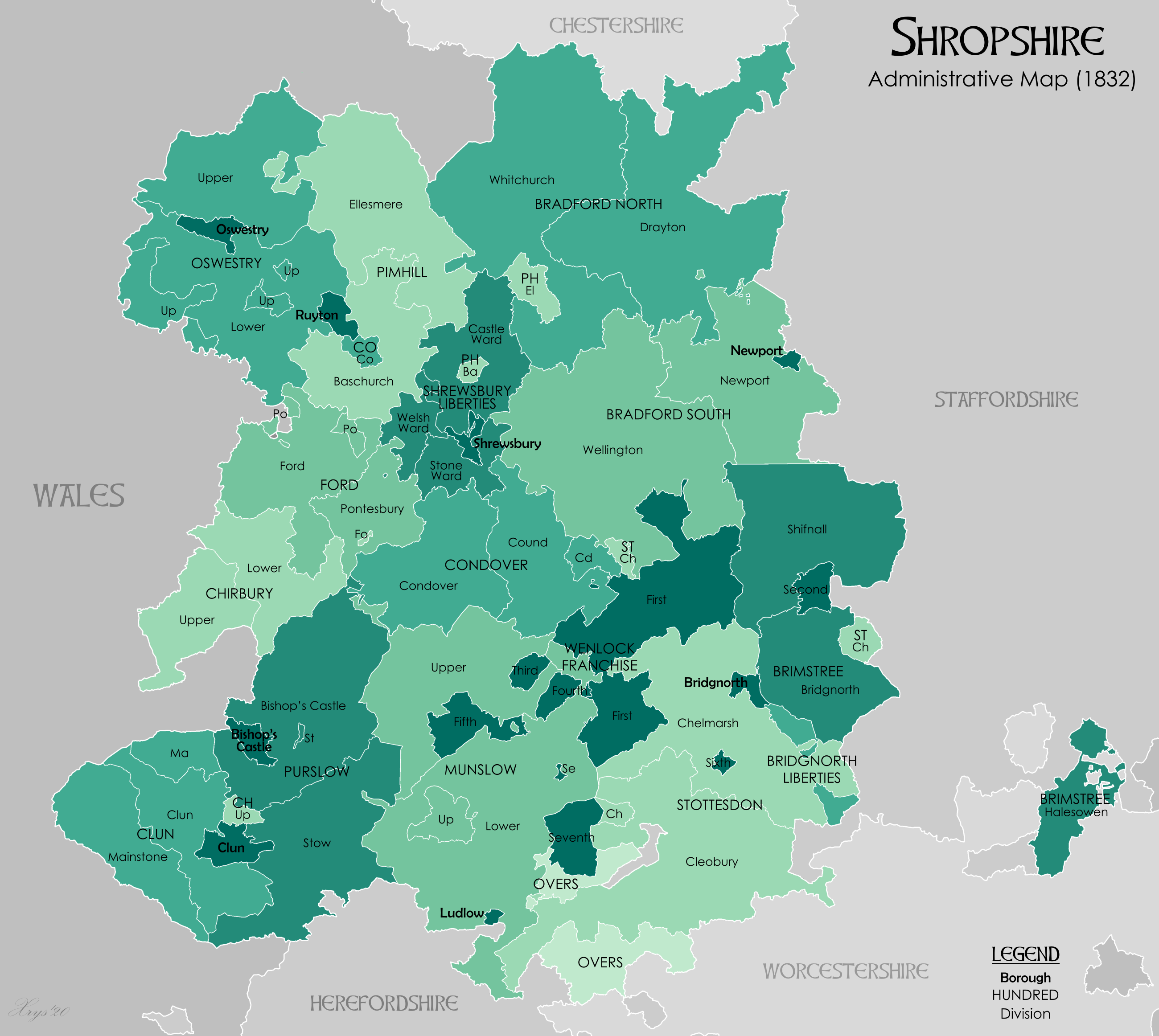
Shropshire Hundreds in 1832

From GENUKI

- Bradford North (Drayton & Whitchurch Divisions)
- Bradford South (Newport & Wellington Divisions)
- Brimstree† (Bridgnorth, Halesowen & Shifnal Divisions)
- Chirbury (Upper & Lower Divisions)
- Clun (Clun & Mainstone Divisions)
- Condover (Condover & Cound Divisions)
- Ford (Ford & Pontesbury Divisions)
- Munslow (Upper & Lower Divisions)
- Oswestry (Upper & Lower Divisions)
- Overs (in two detached parts)
- Pimhill (Baschurch & Ellesmere Divisions)
- Purslow (Bishop's Castle & Stow Divisions)
- Shrewsbury‡ (Castle Ward, Stone Ward & Welsh Ward Divisions)
- Stottesdon (Chelmarsh & Cleobury Divisions)
- Wenlock‡ (First, Second, Third, Fourth, Fifth, Sixth & Seventh Divisions)

† — including the Shropshire exclave of Halesowen ‡ The liberties of the borough of Shrewsbury and priory/borough of Wenlock were extensive and are usually considered as hundreds (Wenlock was sometimes described as the "franchise of Wenlock").

== Somerset ==
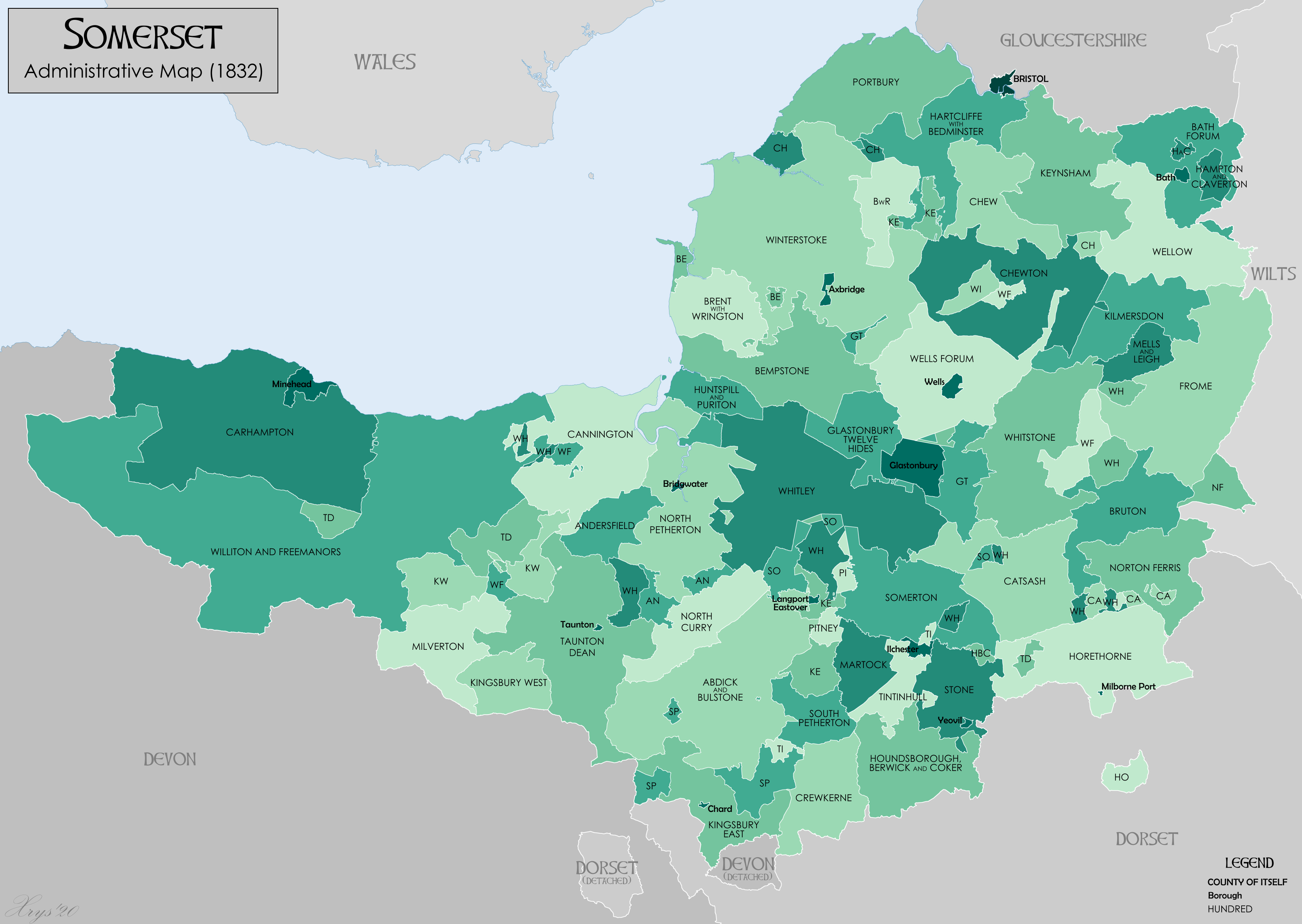
Hundreds of Somerset in 1832

From the National Gazetteer of Britain and Ireland

- Abdick and Bulstone
- Andersfield
- Bath Forum
- Bempstone
- Brent-cum-Wrington
- Bruton
- Cannington
- Carhampton
- Catsash
- Chew
- Chewton
- Crewkerne
- Frome
- Glaston Twelve Hides
- Hampton
- Hartcliffe
- Horethorne
- Houndsborough
- Huntspill and Puriton
- Keynsham
- Kilmersdon
- Kingsbury
- Martock
- Milverton
- North Curry
- North Petherton
- Norton Ferris
- Pitney
- Portbury
- Somerton
- South Petherton
- Stone
- Taunton Deane
- Tintinhull
- Wellow
- Wells Forum
- Whitley
- Whitstone
- Williton and Freemanners
- Winterstoke

== Staffordshire ==
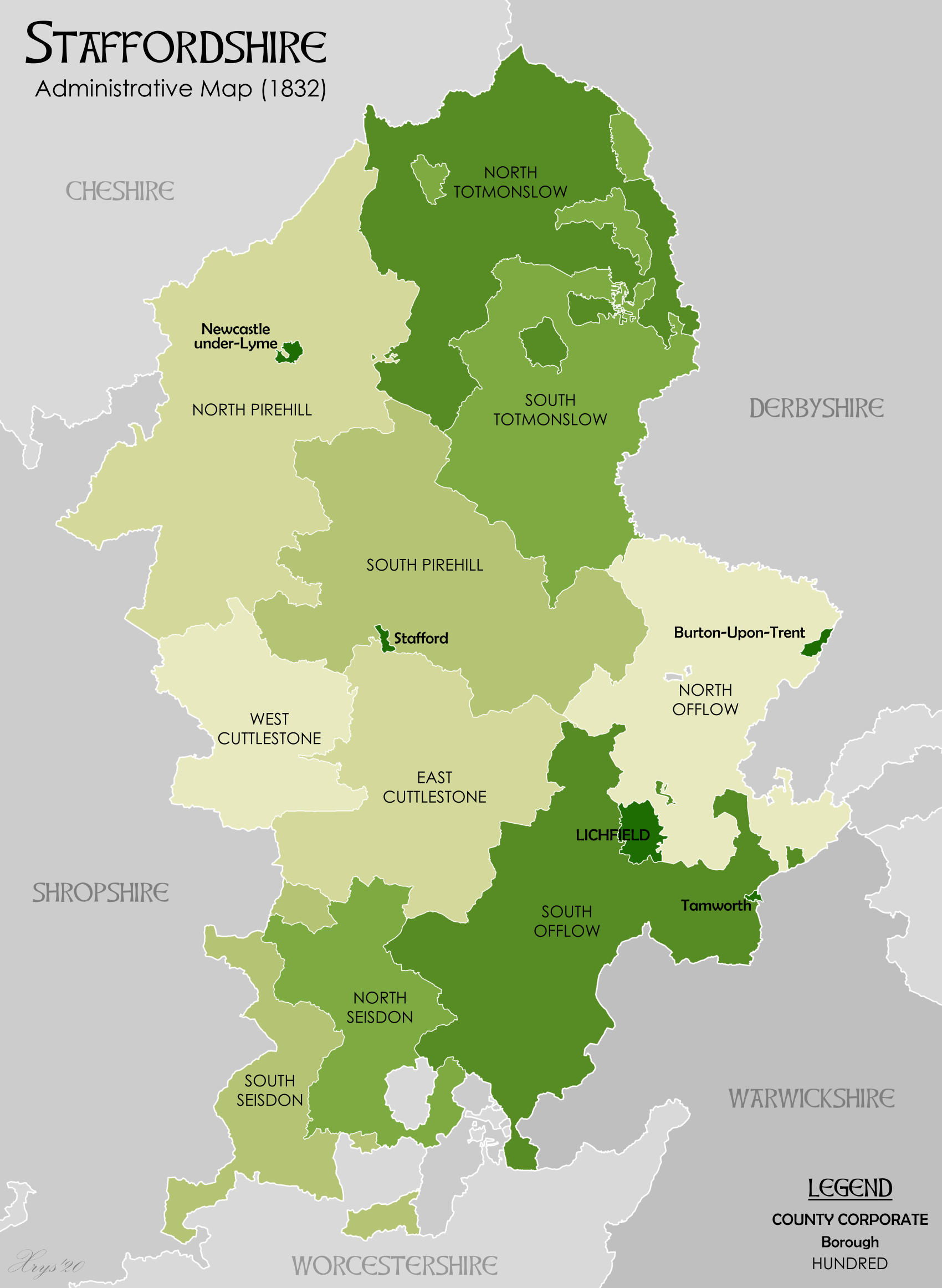
Hundreds of Staffordshire in 1832

From GENUKI

- East Cuttlestone
- West Cuttlestone
- North Offlow
- South Offlow
- North Pirehill
- South Pirehill
- North Seisdon
- South Seisdon
- North Totmonslow
- South Totmonslow

== Suffolk ==
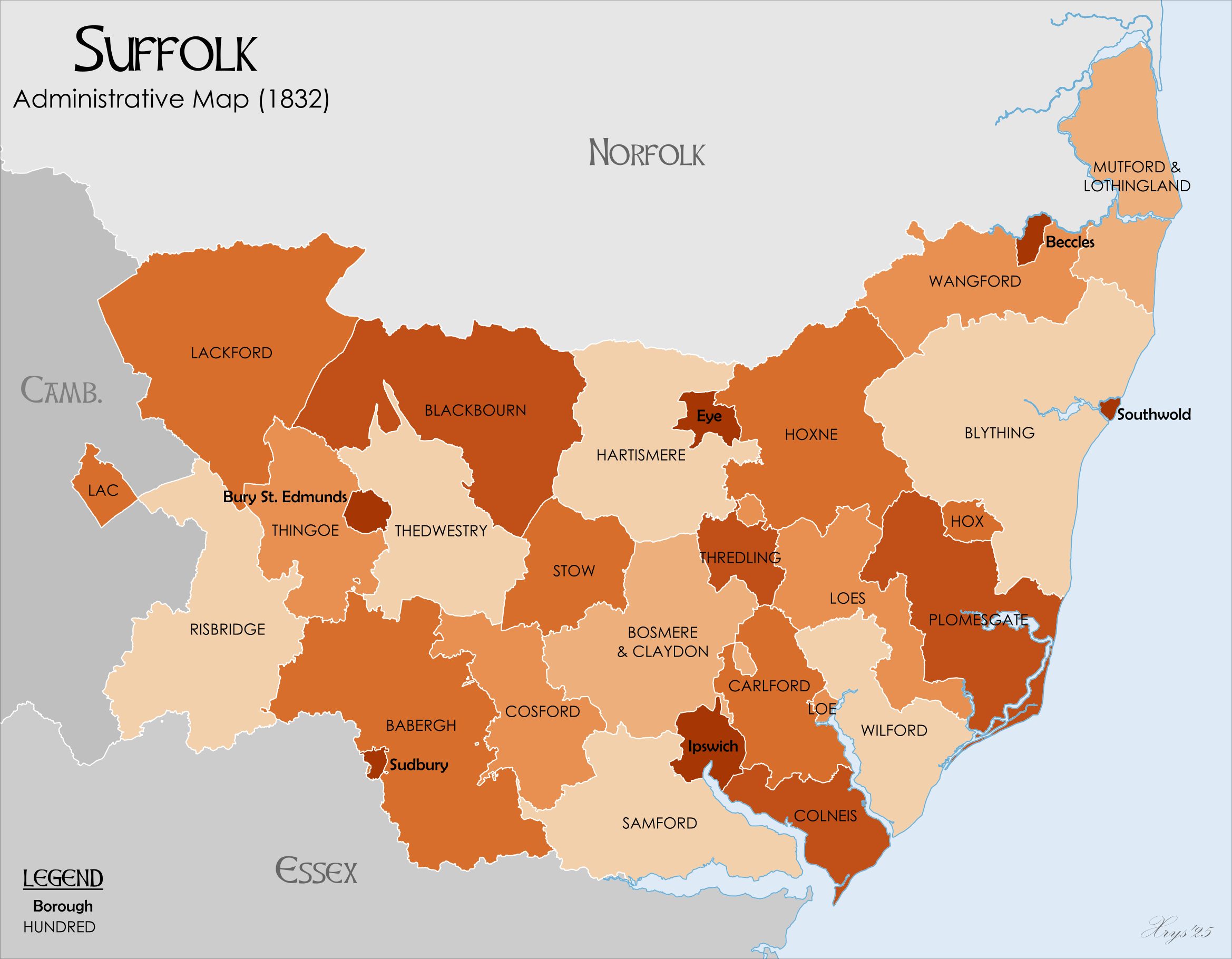
Hundreds of Suffolk in 1832

- Babergh
- Blackbourn
- Blything
- Bosmere and Claydon
- Carlford
- Colneis
- Cosford
- Hartismere
- Hoxne
- Lackford
- Loes
- Mutford
- Plomesgate
- Risbridge
- Samford
- Stow
- Thedwestry
- Thingoe
- Thredling
- Wangford
- Wilford

== Surrey ==
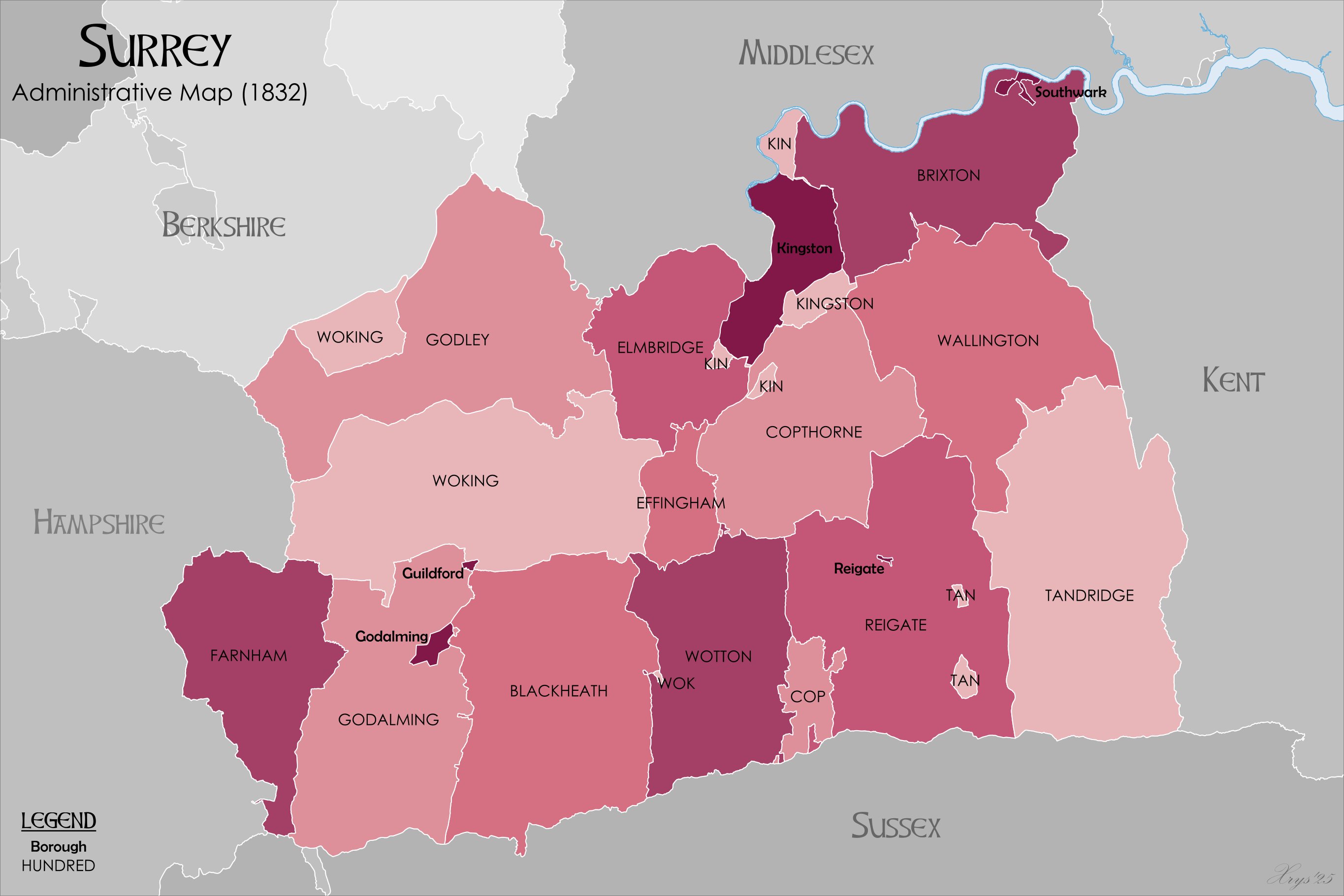
Hundreds of Surrey in 1832

There are thirteen hundreds and a half-hundred:

- Blackheath
- Brixton
- Copthorne
- Elmbridge
- Effingham half hundred
- Farnham
- Godalming
- Godley
- Kingston
- Reigate
- Tandridge
- Wallington
- Woking
- Wotton

== Sussex ==
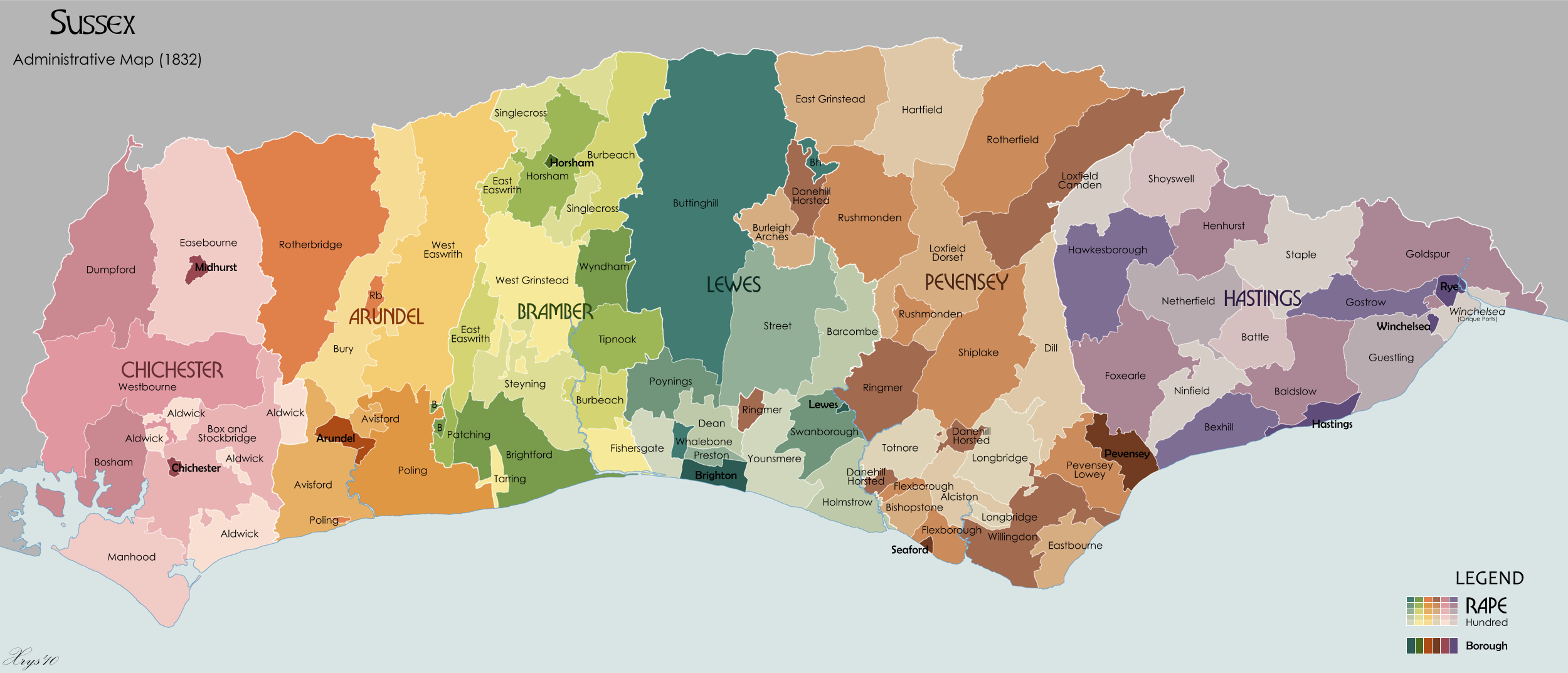
Sussex Hundreds in 1834

Sussex was divided into rapes, and then hundreds.

=== Arundel Rape ===
The Arundel Rape covered nearly all of what is now West Sussex until about 1250, when it was split into two rapes the Arundel Rape and the Chichester Rape. In 1834 it contained five hundreds sub-divided into fifty six parishes.

- Avisford
- Bury
- Poling
- Rotherbridge
- West Easwrith

=== Bramber Rape ===
The Bramber Rape lies between the Rape of Arundel in the west and Lewes in the east. In 1834 it contained 40 parishes in the following hundreds:

- Brightford
- Burbeach
- West Grinstead (Grensted in the Domesday Survey)
- Poling (once known as Rieberge)
- Singlecross
- Steyning
- Tarring (a peculier of the Archbishop of Canterbury)
- Tipnoak

as well as 3 half hundreds

- East Easwrith
- Fishersgate
- Wyndham

=== Chichester Rape ===
The combined Chichester and Arundel Rape covered nearly all of what is now West Sussex until about 1250, when it was split into two rapes the Arundel Rape and the Chichester Rape. In 1834 it contained seven hundreds and seventy-four parishes.

- Aldwick
- Bosham
- Box and Stockbridge
- Dumpford
- Easebourne
- Manhood
- Westbourne and Singleton

=== Hastings Rape ===
Medieval sources talk of a group of people who were separate to that of the South Saxons they were known as the Haestingas. The area of Sussex they occupied became the Rape of Hastings. It encompassed the easternmost part of Sussex, with the county of Kent to its east and the Rape of Pevensey to its west. The Anglo-Saxon hundred of Hailesaltede was later partitioned into Battle Hundred and Netherfield Hundred. In 1833, the Rape of Hastings had 13 hundreds giving a total of about 154,060 acres.

- Baldstrow
- Battle
- Bexhill
- Foxearle
- Goldspur
- Gostrow
- Guestling
- Hawkesborough
- Henhurst
- Netherfield
- Ninfield
- Shoyswell
- Staple

=== Lewes Rape ===
The Rape of Lewes is bounded by the Rape of Bramber on its west and the Rape of Pevensey on its east. Although it had the same amount of hundreds in 1833 as in the Domesday survey, there had been some cases of manors and parishes been taken from one and added to another hundred, and in other cases the hundreds had been divided and lost.

- Barcombe
- Buttinghill
- Dean
- Fishergate
- Holmestrow
- Poynings
- Preston
- Street
- Swanborough
- Whalesbourne
- Younsmere (also Falmer)

=== Pevensey Rape ===
The Pevensey Rape lies between the Rapes of Lewes and Hastings. In 1833 it contained 19 hundreds and 52 parishes

- Alciston
- Bishopstone
- Danehill Horsted
- Dill
- Eastbourne
- East Grinstead (Grinsted in the Domesday survey)
- Flexborough
- Hartfield
- Lindfield Burley-Arches (also Burarches)
- Lowey or Liberty of Pevensey – Part of Port of Hastings, so having the immunities and privileges of the Cinque Ports.
- Loxfield Camden
- Loxfield Dorset
- Longbridge
- Ringmer
- Rotherfield
- Rushmonden
- Shiplake
- Totnore
- Willingdon

== Warwickshire ==
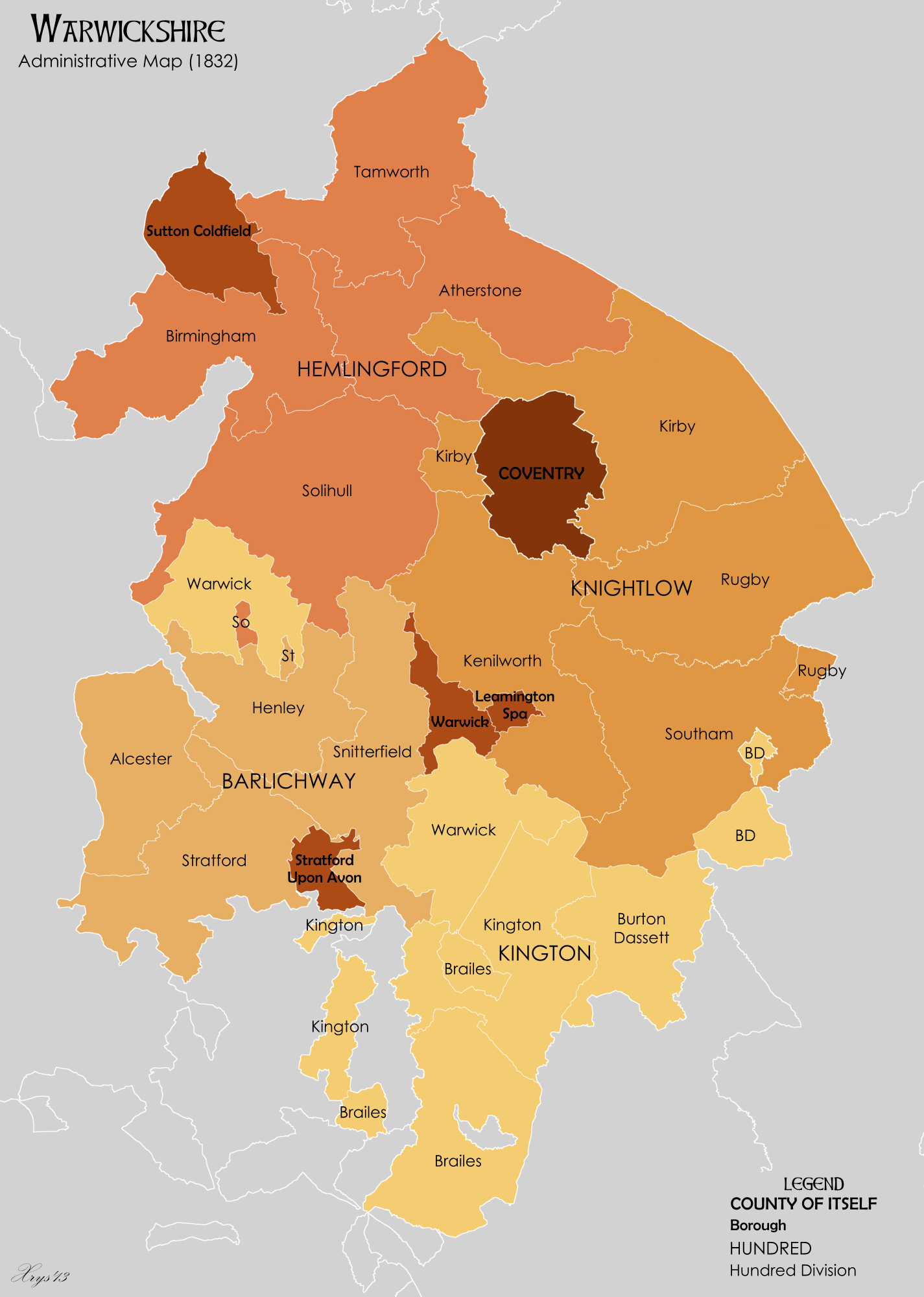
Warwickshire in 1832

Warwickshire was divided into four hundreds, with each hundred consisting of a number of divisions.

- Barlinchway (also Barlichway)
  - Alcester
  - Henley
  - Snitterfield
  - Stratford
- Hemlingford, formerly named Coleshill
  - Atherstone
  - Birmingham
  - Solihull
  - Tamworth
- Kington (also Kineton)
  - Brailes
  - Burton Dassett
  - Kington
  - Warwick
- Knightlow
  - Kenilworth
  - Kirby
  - Rugby
  - Southam

== Westmorland ==
Westmorland was divided into four wards, analogous to hundreds. Pairs of wards made up the two Baronies. From Magna Britannica et Hibernia (1736) Genuki: Westmorland, Westmorland

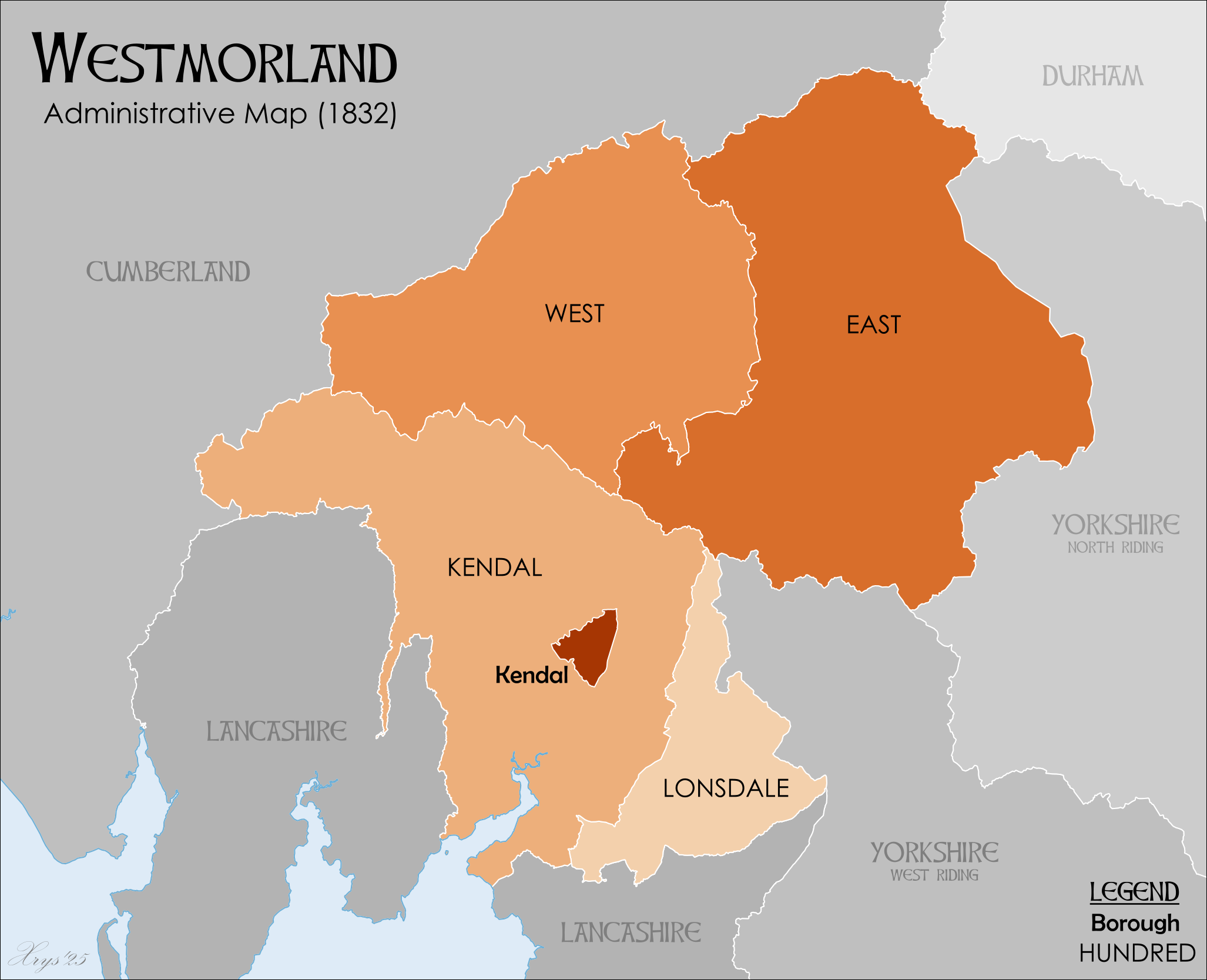
Wards of Westmorland in 1832

=== Barony of Kendal ===
The Barony of Kendal had two wards:

- Kendal
- Lonsdale

=== Barony of Westmorland ===
The Barony of Westmorland had two wards:

- East Ward
- West Ward

== Wiltshire ==
There were 40 hundreds in Wiltshire at the time of the Domesday Survey.

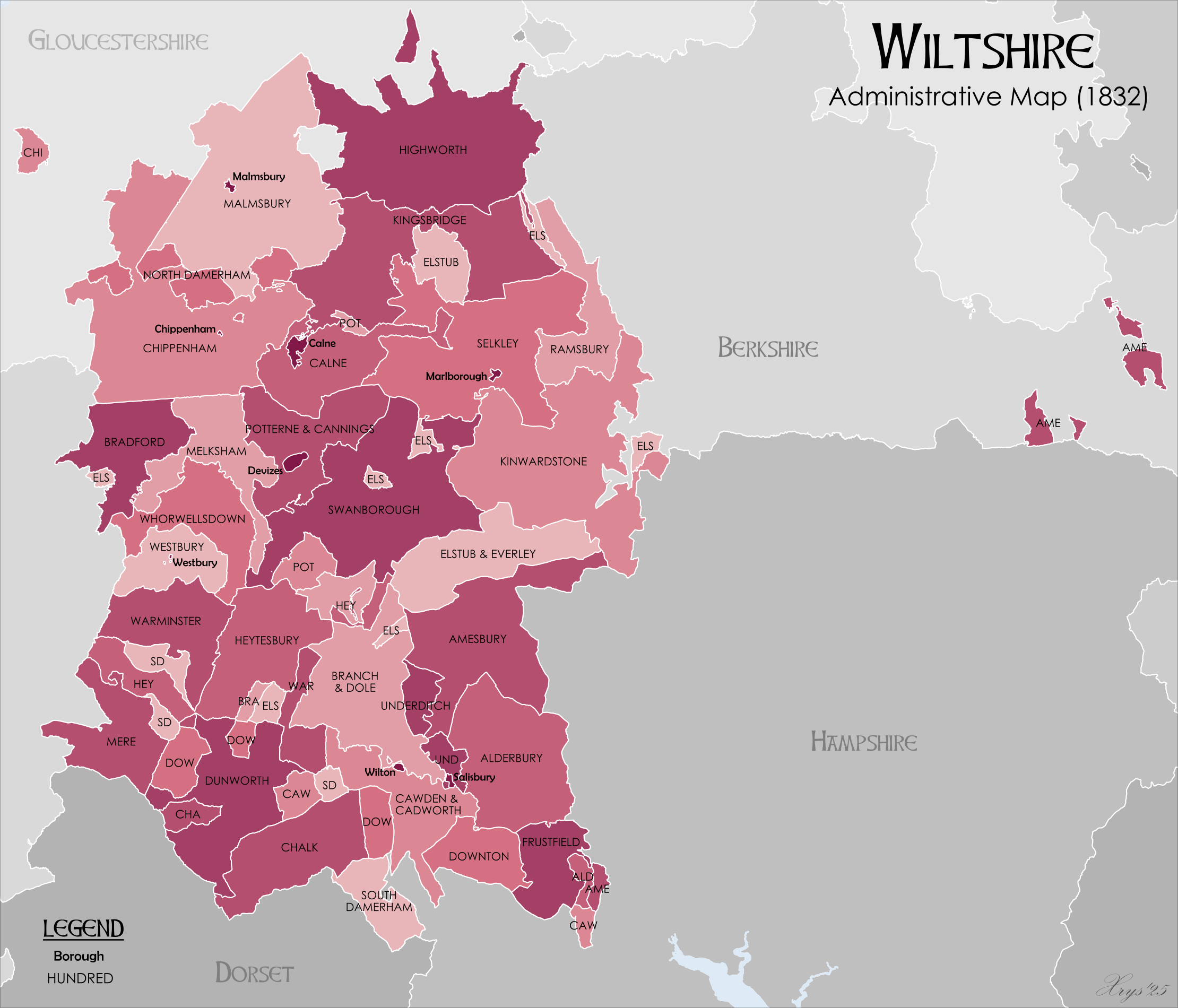
Hundreds of Wiltshire in 1832

Hundreds in 1835 were:

- Alderbury
- Amesbury
- Bradford
- Branch and Dole
- Calne
- Cawden and Cadworth
- Chalk
- Chippenham
- Damersham
- Downton
- Dunworth
- Elstub and Everley
- Frustfield
- Heytesbury
- Highworth
- Kingsbridge
- Kinwardstone
- Malmesbury
- Melksham
- Mere
- North Damerham
- Potterne and Cannings
- Ramsbury
- Selkley
- South Damerham
- Swanborough
- Underditch
- Warminster
- Westbury
- Whorwellsdown

== Worcestershire ==
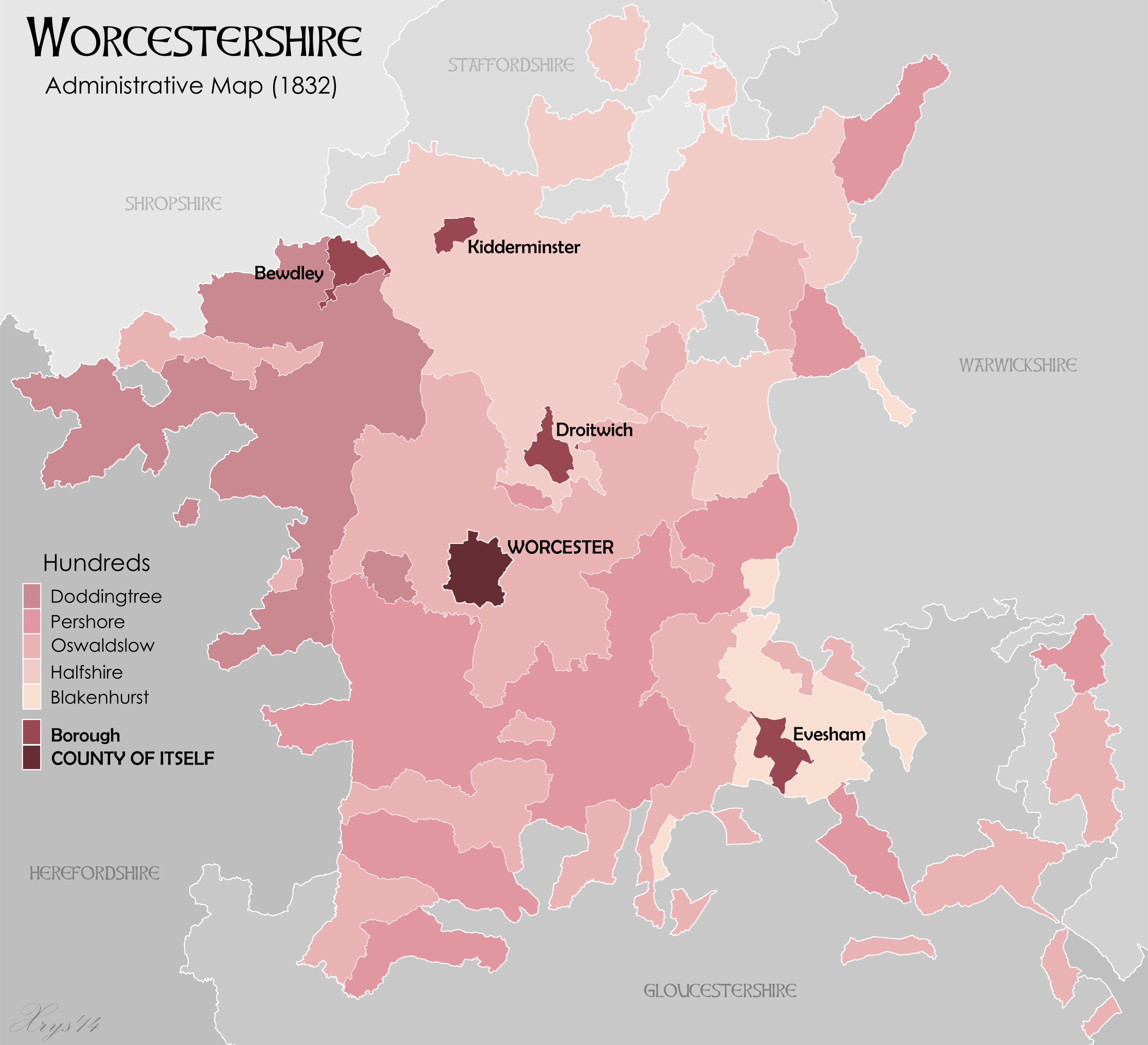
Worcestershire in 1832

The ancient hundreds in 1086 at the time of the Domesday survey were: Ash, Came, Celfledetorn, Clent, Cresslow, Cutestornes, Doddingtree, Dudstone, Fernecumbe, Fishborough, Greston, Ossulstone, Oswaldslow, Pershore, Plegelgete, Seisdon, Tewkesbury, Tibblestone, Wolfhay. Some of the parishes within these hundreds, such as Feckenham in Ash Hundred, or Gloucester in Dudstone Hundred, may have partially been in other counties or were transferred between counties in the intervening years.

Over the centuries, some of the hundreds were amalgamated and appear in many useful statistical records. The hundreds that continued their courts until disuse include:

- Blackenhurst
- Doddingtree
- Halfshire – combined the Domesday hundreds of Clent and Cresslow
- Oswaldslow – combined three ancient hundreds
- Pershore

== Yorkshire ==
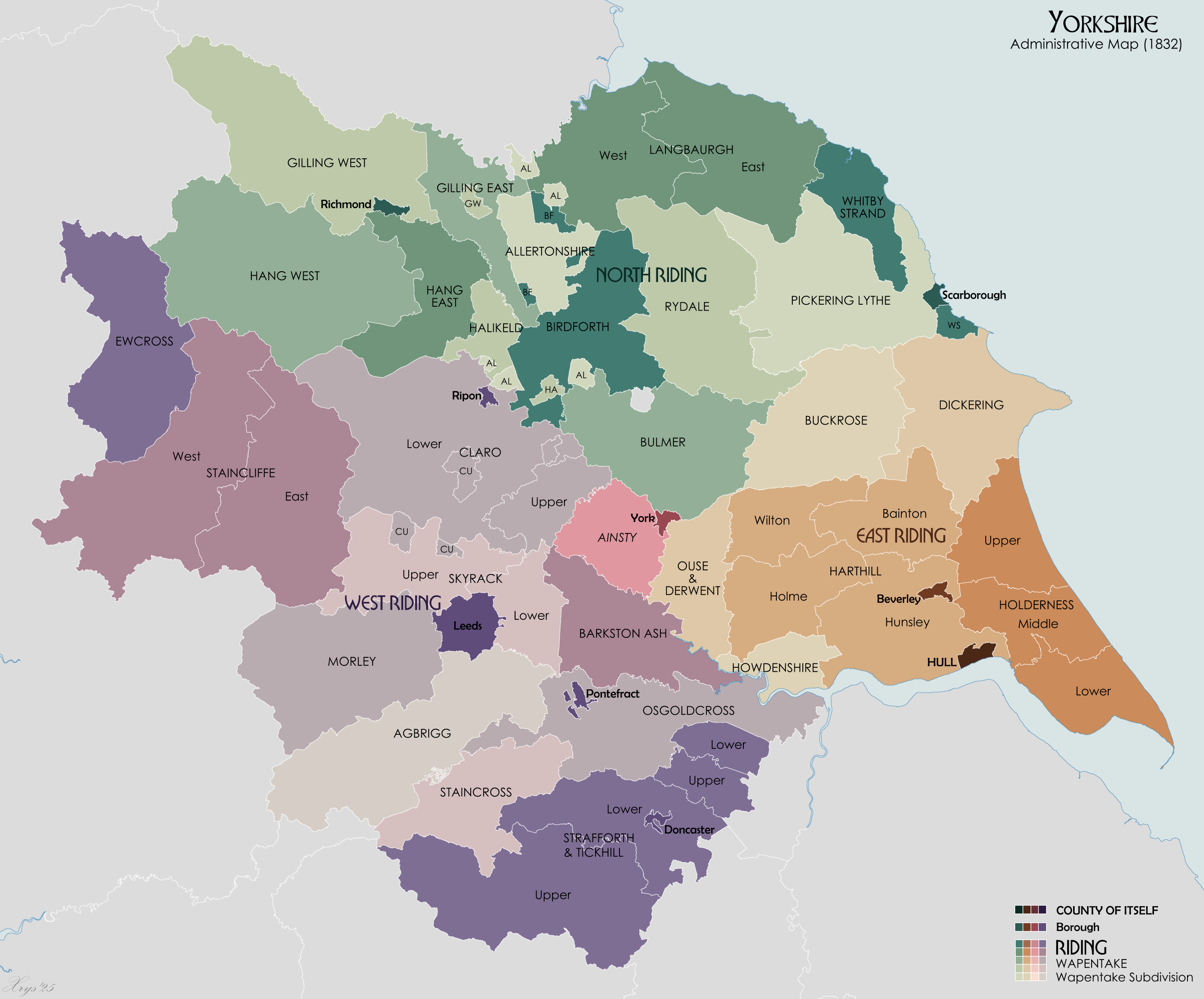
Yorkshire in 1832

Yorkshire has three Ridings, East, North and West. Each of these was divided into wapentakes, analogous to hundreds.

The Ainsty wapentake, first associated with the West Riding, became associated in the fifteenth century with the City of York, outside the Riding system.

The hundreds of Amounderness and Lonsdale in Lancashire plus part of Westmorland were considered as part of Yorkshire in the Domesday Book.

=== East Riding ===
From GENUKI GENUKI: Definitions of the terms used to describe areas of land and habitation in the county of Yorkshire.

- Buckrose
- Dickering Wapentake
- Harthill Wapentake (Bainton Beacon, Holme Beacon, Hunsley Beacon and Wilton Beacon divisions)
- Holderness Wapentake (North, Middle and South divisions)
- Howdenshire
- Ouse and Derwent

The other division of the riding was Hullshire.

=== North Riding ===
- Allerton
- Birdforth – Formed from at least some parishes of the Domesday wapentake of Yarlestre.
- Bulmer
- Gilling East
- Gilling West
- Hallikeld
- Hang East
- Hang West
- Langbaurgh (West and East divisions)
- Pickering Lythe – Formed from the Domesday wapentake of Dic, and additionally by 1284–85 the parish of Sinnington and by (circa 15th–16th century) the parish of Kirkby Misperton, both from the Domesday wapentake of Maneshou.
- Ryedale – First mentioned by name in 1165–66, probably when its court was relocated there. Formed from the Domesday wapentake of Maneshou minus Sinnington and Kirkby Misperton parishes, plus the additional parish of Lastingham from the Domesday wapentake of Dic. In the 19th century, Ryedale contained the parishes of Ampleforth; Appleton-Le-Street; Barton-Le-Street; Great Edston; Gilling; Helmsley; Hovingham; Kirkby Moorside; Kirkdale; Lastingham; New Malton, including the parishes of St. Leonard and St. Michael; Old Malton; Normanby; Nunnington; Oswaldkirk; Salton; Scawton; Slingsby; Stonegrave.
- Whitby Strand

=== West Riding ===
From GENUKI GENUKI: Definitions of the terms used to describe areas of land and habitation in the county of Yorkshire.

- Agbrigg and Morley (Agbrigg and Morley divisions)
- Ainsty wapentake (East and West divisions) (became a district named Ainsty of York in the 15th century)
- Barkston Ash Wapentake
- Claro Wapentake (Upper and Lower divisions) (Burghshire wapentake was renamed in the 12th century)
- Ewcross
- Osgoldcross Wapentake
- Skyrack (Upper and Lower divisions)
- Staincliffe Wapentake (East and West divisions)
- Staincross Wapentake
- Strafforth and Tickhill (Upper and Lower divisions)

== See also ==
- List of hundreds of Wales
