= Devon Trained Bands =

Part-time military force in the maritime county of Devonshire

- Active: 1558–1662
- Country: Kingdom of England
- Branch: Trained Bands
- Role: Infantry and Cavalry
- Engagements: Siege of Sherborne; Siege of Exeter (1642); Second Battle of Modbury; Battle of Beacon Hill; Battle of Stratton; Siege of Exeter (1643); Sieges of Barnstaple; Siege of Plymouth

Commanders
- Notable commanders: Sir John Bampfylde, 1st Baronet; Sir John Northcote, 1st Baronet; Sir Samuel Rolle

The Devon Trained Bands were a part-time militia force recruited from Devonshire in South West England, first organised in 1558. They were periodically embodied for home defence and internal security, including the Spanish Armada campaign in 1588, and saw active service during the First English Civil War. They were reformed into the Devon Militia in 1662.

== Early history ==
The English militia was descended from the Anglo-Saxon Fyrd, the military force raised from the freemen of the shires under command of their Sheriff. It continued as the Shire levy or Posse comitatus under the Norman kings, and was reorganised under the Assizes of Arms of 1181 and 1252, and again by King Edward I's Statute of Winchester of 1285.

== Trained Bands ==
The legal basis of the militia was updated by two acts of 1557 covering musters (4 & 5 Ph. & M. c. 3) and the maintenance of horses and armour (4 & 5 Ph. & M. c. 2). The county militia was now placed under the Lord Lieutenant, assisted by the Deputy Lieutenants and Justices of the Peace. The entry into force of these Acts in 1558 is seen as the starting date for the organised county militia in England.

The Earl of Bedford was appointed lieutenant for the counties of Devon, Cornwall, Dorset and Exeter, and issued detailed orders for the organisation of the militia on 18 April 1558. He organised the men from the Hundreds of Devonshire into four groups for the defence of the harbours on the north and south coasts of the county:

- Under Sir Thomas Denys, with 12 assistants and 9 'petty captains': the City of Exeter and the Hundreds of Wonford, Crediton, West Budleigh, Cliston, Ottery St Mary, Exminster, Teignbridge and Haytor – for the defence of Teignmouth, Tor Bay and Dartmouth, and all the creeks and landing-places in the hundreds
- Under Sir John St Leger, with 9 assistants and 8 petty captains: the Hundreds of Axminster, Halberton, Hemyock, Hayridge, Bampton, Sollington, Tiverton, Witheridge and East Budleigh – for the defence of Axmouth Haven, Exmouth, and the creeks between there and Lyme
- Under Sir John Chichester, with 10 assistants and 8 petty captains: the Hundreds of Braunton, Shirwell, Fremington, Shebbear, Hartland, Black Torrington, South Molton, North Tawton and Winkleigh – for the defence of Hartland, Clovelly, Welcombe Sands, Ilfracombe, Combe Martin and all the creeks in the hundreds
- Under Sir Richard Edgcumbe, with 8 assistants and 7 petty captains: the Hundreds of Roborough, Ermington, Plympton, Tavistock, Lifton and Stanborough – for the defence of Plymouth Haven and the creeks from there to Kingsbridge

Most of these men would have been armed with longbows or bills, because the 1560 survey of arms and armour in Devonshire reported only two arquebuses. However, nine years later there were 595 arquebuses in the county, besides 112 in Exeter. Although the militia obligation was universal, it was clearly impractical to train and equip every able-bodied man, so the militia commissioners in some counties including Devon separated their able men aged 16 to 60 into three categories. 'Pryncipall' men were best suited for soldiering; those of the 'seconde' rank had some promise, while the remainder were classed as 'unable'. After 1572 it became the universal practice to select a proportion of the available men for the Trained Bands (TBs), who were mustered for regular training. In that year Devonshire mustered 9224 'able men', including tin-miners and mariners, under 53 Captains, but the musters were unsatisfactory, with many propertied people shirking their obligation to provide arms and armour. This earned the Earl of Bedford a rebuke from Queen Elizabeth I.

By 1577 the Devon Trained Bands were divided into three divisions, each with two colonels and six captains:

- East Division, Cols Sir William Courtenay and Sir Robert Denys
- North Division, Cols Hugh Fortescue and Hugh Pollard
- South Division, Cols Sir John Gilbert and Hugh Cary of Cockington

By now the weapons consisted of 647 calivers (firearms), 651 longbows, 830 pikes and 1160 'black bills' and halberds, with 841 corslets (pikemen's armour) and 637 Morion helmets.

== Spanish War ==
The threat of invasion during the Spanish War led to emphasis being placed on the 17 'maritime' counties most vulnerable to attack, and in 1584 the Devon TBs fielded more men than any other county: assessed at 1200 'shot' (men with firearms), 800 bowmen, and 1000 'corslets', the county actually provided more than was required in each category, a total of 3178 men. In the Armada year of 1588 the three Devonshire Divisions (each of three large companies, totalling 3661 men) were instructed to join the army forming to defend the South Coast of England, while 1650 able-bodied untrained men remained to defend the county. Devon also supplied 150 light horsemen and 50 'petronels' (the petronel was an early cavalry firearm); it had no 'lances' (heavily armoured horsemen) but instead supplied 200 additional musketeers.

In the 16th Century little distinction was made between the militia and the troops levied by the counties for overseas expeditions, and between 1585 and 1601 Devon supplied over 1490 levies for service in Ireland, 750 for France and 150 for the Netherlands. However, the counties usually conscripted the unemployed and criminals rather than the Trained Bandsmen – in 1585 the Privy Council had ordered the impressment of able-bodied unemployed men, and the Queen ordered 'none of her trayned-bands to be pressed'. Replacing the weapons issued to the levies from the militia armouries was a heavy cost on the counties.

== Stuart reform ==
With the passing of the threat of invasion, the trained bands declined in the early 17th Century. Later, King Charles I attempted to reform them into a national force or 'Perfect Militia' answering to the king rather than local control. In 1633 the Devon TBs under the 4th Earl of Bedford as Lord Lieutenant were organised as:

- South Division:
  - Col Sir Edward Seymour's Regiment: 585 muskets and 315 pikes in 6 companies
  - Col Henry Champernowne's Regiment: 256 muskets and 125 pikes in 4 companies (from the South Hams area)
  - Col John Bampfylde Junior's Regiment: 617 muskets and 353 pikes in 6 companies (from North East Devon)
  - Plymouth Town Regiment: 218 muskets and 92 pikes in 4 companies
  - Dartmouth Trained Band: 64 muskets and 32 pukes in 1 company
- Eastern Division:
  - Col Francis Courtenay's Regiment: 600 muskets and 400 pikes in 6 companies
  - Col Sir John Drake's Regiment: 594 muskets and 408 pikes in 6 companies
- North Division:
  - Col Hugh Pollard's Regiment: 649 muskets and 370 pikes in 6 companies (probably commanded by his father Sir Lewis Pollard, 1st Baronet in 1630)
  - Col John Acland's Regiment: 624 muskets and 360 pikes in 6 companies
  - Col Sir Ferdinando Gorges' Horse: three 'cornets' (Troops)
  - Barnstaple Trained Band: 52 muskets and 40 pikes in 1 company

In addition there were also the Exeter Trained Band and four independent companies of 'tinners' from the Stannary towns of Chagford, Ashburton, Tavistock and Plympton.

By 1638 the Devon TBs totalled 4253 muskets and 2509 corslets.

== Bishops' Wars ==
Although every English county was ordered in late 1638 to muster its TBs and keep them in readiness, the men of the West Country were kept in reserve and were not involved in the First Bishops' War of 1639. However, Charles planned a larger invasion force for the Second Bishops' War in 1640, and every county was given a quota of troops to provide from its TBs: Devon was ordered to March 2000 men to Newcastle upon Tyne.

However, substitution was rife and many of those sent on this unpopular service would have been untrained replacements and 'pressed men' (conscripts). Officers from the Pollard family extracted such large bribes from Degory Doole of North Petherwin and Thomas Jeffrey of Monkokehampton to avoid service that they were prosecuted for extortion in the Star Chamber. Not only were the conscripted men untrained, they were also undisciplined. On the march north a company of the Dorset TBs had murdered their Lieutenant, whose harshness was resented and who was rumoured to be a 'Papist', while the Dorset men were largely Puritans. Apart from a few named men (most of whom were not caught) the Dorset TBs were treated with surprising lenience, and trouble continued. Three weeks later, at Wellington, Somerset, a group of North Devon conscripts dragged Lieutenant Compton Evers from his lodgings and beat and stabbed him to death for being a Papist. They then deserted. This time the government acted vigorously: although the Somerset authorities were supine (the people of Wellington were fined for not doing anything to prevent the murder), the deputy lieutenants of Devon succeeded in capturing 140 of the 160 deserters when they reached home. However the disorders continued when the army's infantry assembled under Sir Jacob Astley at Selby in July. Astley reported that Lt-Col Culpepper hd been 'beastly slain by the Devonshire men'. The campaign was a fiasco, and ended in defeat at the Battle of Newburn in August.

== Civil War ==
Control of the militia was one of the areas of dispute between King Charles I and Parliament that led to the First English Civil War, yet when open war broke out neither side made much use of the TBs beyond securing the county armouries for their own full-time troops. Some trained bands were used as garrison troops, only a few as field regiments. An attempt by the Royalists to call out the posse comitatus of Devonshire in 1642 was a failure (compared with their success in raising the Trained Bands in neighbouring Cornwall) and it was quickly dispersed by Parliamentarian forces.

The Devon TB colonels and their regiments supported Parliament. The South Hams and North East Devon regiments were still commanded by Col Henry Champernowne of Modbury and Sir John Bampfylde. The East Devon regiment (probably Drake's) was commanded by Sir Henry Rosewell of Forde Abbey, John Drake's brother-in-law, and Sir John Northcote, who had been a militia captain since 1627, also commanded one of the regiments. By the summer of 1642 Pollard's former North Devon regiment was under the command of Sir Samuel Rolle. In August Arthur Bassett was commissioned to take command of the regiment and attempted to disband and disarm it to provide for the Royalist army. He was ignored, and Rolle's Regiment supported the Parliamentarians. John Bampfylde and John Northcote had both been created baronets by Charles the previous year, but when war came they supported Parliament.

By September 1642 Parliamentary forces were gaining control of Devon. Rosewell's and possibly Northcote's regiments were at the indecisive Siege of Sherborne Castle in September 1642, after which the Royalist commander, the Marquess of Hertford, withdrew with his infantry and artillery into South Wales where he had greater support. Sir Ralph Hopton led the Royalist cavalry west into Cornwall, which was firmly held for the King by the Cornish TBs. Both counties' trained bands were reluctant to cross the River Tamar that forms the border between them, but Hopton was able to recruit a brigade of excellent infantry from the ranks of the Cornish TBs. He then began moving back into Devon in December: Rolle's Regiment of Devon TBs and possibly the Barnstaple Company were engaged in a skirmish at Torrington. Hopton failed in an attempt to take Plymouth, then moved on Exeter, which he briefly besieged. The Exeter TB, supplemented by volunteers, formed part of the Parliamentary garrison together with Bampfylde's and possibly Rosewell's TB regiments. However, the Parliamentary garrison of Plymouth threw reinforcements into Exeter and Hopton was forced to retire into Cornwall once more.

Parliamentary forces followed Hopton into Cornwall but were beaten at the Battle of Braddock Down and Hopton was able to re-enter Devonshire, resuming the blockade of Plymouth. He sent SirJohn Berkeley to 'beat up' the quarters of Major-General James Chudleigh's Parliamentarian force at Kingsbridge, which was successful. But when Berkeley attempted to do the same at Okehampton on 8 February 1643 the Parliamentary troops initially dispersed, then rallied at Chagford, where they caused casualties to the Royalists in a confused skirmish. Northcote's regiment may have been involved in this action. As Hopton tried to gain control of Devonshire, Sir Thomas Hele was commissioned on 20 February to take over Champernowne's South Hams TB (consisting of 1000 'tinners') for the Royalists, but early on 21 February the Royalists were attacked in Modbury by a large Parliamentary force that the Earl of Stamford had gathered to relieve Plymouth. This force included Champernowne's, Bampfylde's, Rolle's and Rosewell's (and possibly Northcote's) TB regiments and the Barnstaple Company. The Royalists lost 100 dead, 150 prisoners and 5 guns at the Second Battle of Modbury, and retreated from this, abandoned their blockade of Plymouth, and agreeing a local truce they retired into Cornwall. Parliament regained control of South Devon and Hele never took over the South Hams regiment.

On the expiry of the truce, Stamford sent Chudleigh with a force including elements at least of Rolle's, Rosewell's and Bampfylde's Devon TB regiments across the Tamar at Polson Bridge to attack Launceston on 23 April. Hopton with a smaller force took up a position on Beacon Hill outside the town and Chudleigh began an attack. Both sides received reinforcements during the day, including 100 men of Northcote's Regiment, who with a London regiment defended Polson Bridge against the Royalist cavalry. By the end of the day Hopton had a superior force and began a counter-attack, but Chudleigh got his shaken men back over the river, covered by the steadiness of the party at the bridge. Following up into Devon, Hopton's army in turn was routed at the Battle of Sourton Down on 25 April. Amongst the material captured were Hopton's papers, including orders he had received to link up with the Royalist forces in Somerset. Stamford then collected as many troops as he could (including Rolle's, Rosewell's and Bampfylde's Devon TB regiments) to invade Cornwall and prevent Hopton joining this concentration. Stamford took up a strong hilltop position at Stratton in North East Cornwall, the only part of the county that supported Parliament. Despite being heavily outnumbered, Hopton's infantry stormed the hill with three converging columns on 16 May (the Battle of Stratton). The Parliamentary army including the Devon TBs broke and fled, leaving 300 dead and 1700 prisoners, Chudleigh amongst them.

After Stratton Hopton quickly overran the whole of Devonshire, with the exception of the garrisoned towns of Plymouth, Exeter, Dartmouth, Bideford and Barnstaple, which were masked while Hopton joined the Royalist Western Army in Somerset. Sir John Berkeley began a close siege of Exeter in June. The garrison included the Exeter TB and the surviving elements of the East Devon TB (probably now under Col Henry Aishford) and the North East Devon TB (possibly commanded by Col John Wear). Northcote's regiment was also present, 1200 strong, but it was probably now a full-time volunteer regiment, even if it was partly recruited from his trained band regiment. The Parliamentarian navy attempted to run supplies into the city on 25 July, but failed with the loss of three ships. Berkeley was now reinforced by Prince Maurice with the Western Army. In August the Parliamentary commanders decided to relieve Exeter by land, using forces drawn from the garrisons of Plymouth, Barnstaple and Bideford. Berkeley sent Sir John Digby with his regiment of horse and some dragoons to prevent the Bideford and Barnstaple forces from joining up. He arrived at Torrington, where he was joined by some newly raised foot, and quartered his men in the town. However, the Barnstaple and Bideford men (300 horse and 1200 foot, including Rolle's Devon TB) got within half of a mile of the town before they were seen. Hurriedly deploying the guard, Digby with four or five other mounted officers charged the Parliamentary 'Forlorn hope' of 50 musketeers, who panicked and fled. The panic spread to the main force, which also fled, pursued by Digby and the 150 troopers of the guard who killed 200 and captured 200 prisoners. Barnstaple and Bideford surrendered soon afterwards, Exeter followed on 4 September, and Dartmouth surrendered to Maurice in October, with the capture of large numbers of ships and cannon. Northcote was taken prisoner at Barnstaple, and the TB regiments in the garrisons were dispersed.

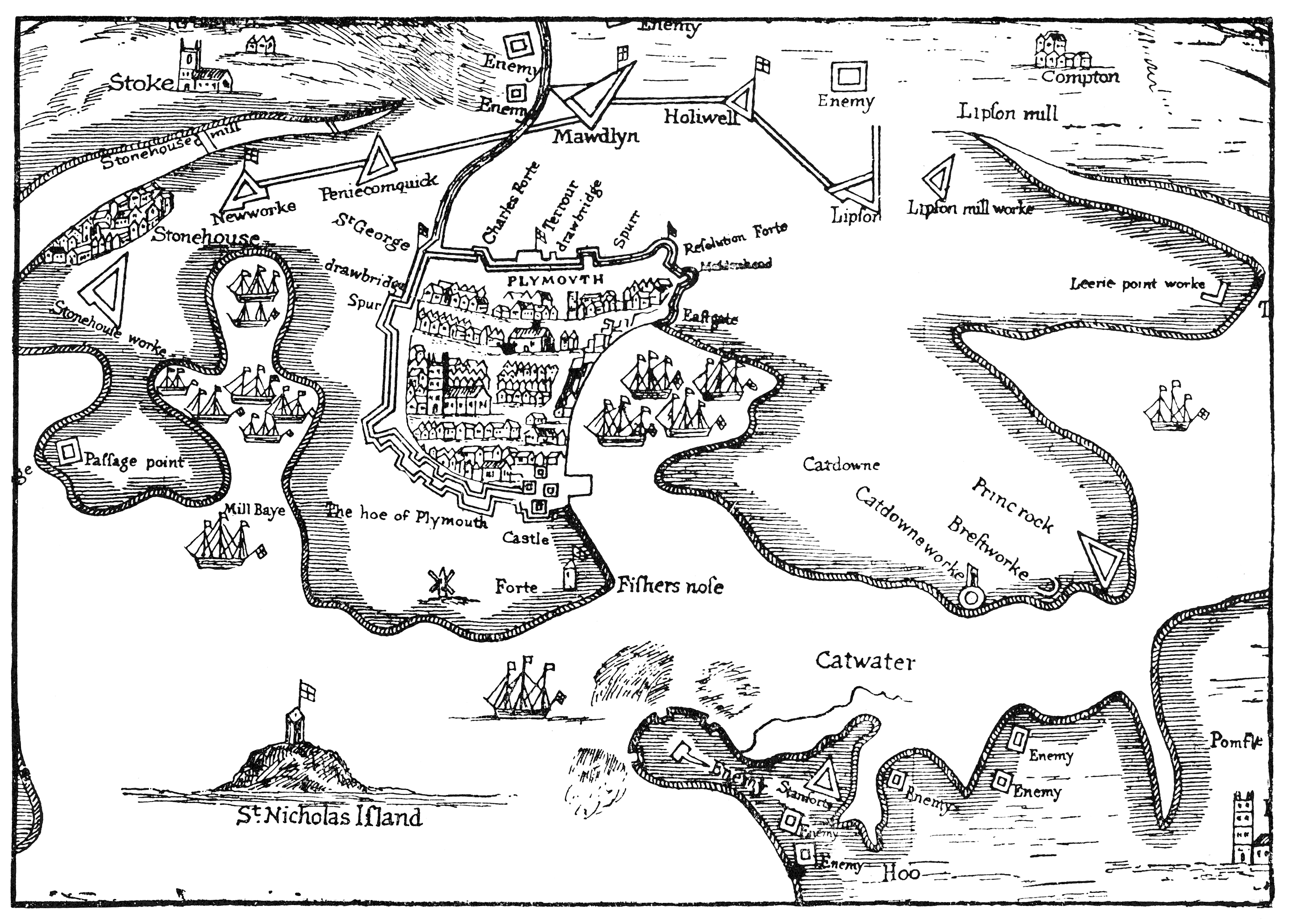
Map of the Siege of Plymouth, 1643.

Plymouth was now closely besieged by the Royalists, using the ships captured at Dartmouth to prevent resupply by sea. The prewar Plymouth Town TB regiment, whose normal role was to provide part-time unpaid night sentries, formed part of the garrison. However, Plymouth was well-defended and Maurice broke up the siege in December to go into winter quarters. He renewed the siege in early 1644, but on 20 April he temporarily left to begin a Siege of Lyme Regis in Dorset. Parliament now sent its main army under the Earl of Essex to relieve these sieges. Maurice raised the siege of Lyme on 18 June and fell back to Exeter. Essex then pushed further into the West Country, reaching Tavistock on 23 July, upon which Sir Richard Grenville raised the siege of Plymouth and retired over the Tamar. After Barnstaple was recaptured by the Parliamentary forces, Rolle recalled his North Devon TB regiment, which reformed under Col John Luttrell, a former major in the regiment. Luttrell had been commissioned colonel on 2 June 1644 to raise new Parliamentary regiments of horse and foot for the operation to recapture Barnstaple, but may have simply taken over Rolle's men. Luttrell's regiment was involved in attacks on Appledore Fort.

However, Essex now overreached himself and marched on into Cornwall. His army had been weakened by the need to garrison the recaptured towns, and he drew out 1000 men from the Plymouth garrison as reinforcements. At Lostwithiel he was bottled up by the King's army that had arrived from Oxford, while the fleet was kept in Plymouth by adverse winds and could not relieve him. Although the cavalry cut their way out of the trap, Essex and the foot were obliged to surrender on 2 September. The paroled Parliamentary troops made their way to Portsmouth. Only 200 of the men drawn from Plymouth garrison returned. That same month Luttrell's Regiment was involved in a failed defence of Barnstaple, and the captured regiment was officially disbanded on 1 December 1644 (after which Luttrell briefly commanded the Plymouth Regiument of Horse in the Plymouth garrison). The Royalists resumed their landward blockade of Plymouth, which was now undermanned. However, the town could be resupplied by sea and it continued to hold out in the Royalists' rear.

By now the Plymouth Town Regiment was the only unit of the Devon TBs still serving under Parliamentary command. Sir Popham Southcott of Bovey Tracey and Mohun's Ottery had been a colonel of the Devon TBs before the war. He died in 1643, but some of his former regiment may have been among the Royalists besieged by the New Model Army at Great Fulford in October 1645. The New Model Army finally relieved Plymouth for the last time in January 1646 as the war drew to an end and it completed the conquest of the West Country.

=== Commonwealth Militia ===
Once Parliament had established full control of the country in 1648 it passed legislation to reorganise the militia in various counties, including an Ordinance to settle the Militia of Devon on 7 June. The term 'Trained Band' began to disappear in most counties. Under the Commonwealth and Protectorate the militia received pay when called out, and operated alongside the New Model Army to control the country.

After the Restoration of the Monarchy, the English Militia was re-established by the Militia Act of 1661 under the control of the king's lords-lieutenant, the men to be selected by ballot. The Militia regiments reformed in 1662 were popularly seen as the 'Constitutional Force' to counterbalance a 'Standing Army' tainted by association with the New Model Army that had supported Cromwell's military dictatorship, and almost the whole burden of home defence and internal security was entrusted to the militia under politically reliable local landowners. The Devon Militia were reformed around 1662.
