= Washfield =

Village in Devon, England

Coordinates: 50°56′N 3°31′W

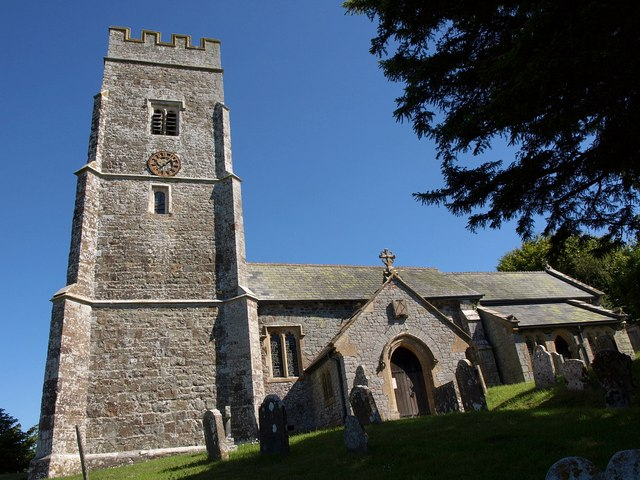
- St Mary the Virgin Church, Washfield

- Location within Devon
- Population: 362 (2001 census)
- Civil parish: Washfield
- District: Mid Devon
- Shire county: Devon
- Region: South West
- Country: England
- Sovereign state: United Kingdom

Washfield is a village, parish and former manor in Mid Devon, Devon, England, situated about 2 miles north-west of Tiverton. The parish church is dedicated to St Mary the Virgin. It was within the jurisdiction of the historic West Budleigh Hundred. In 2001 the parish had a population of 362.

== History ==
Washfield is listed in the Domesday Book of 1086 as two separate manors, now referred to as Little Washfield and Great Washfield. Washfield is situated close to Tiverton Castle, one of the most important mediaeval strongholds in Devon, and principal seat of the Earls of Devon, feudal barons of Plympton.

=== Great Washfield ===
Great Washfield was held by Ralph de Pomeroy, one of William the Conqueror's Devon Domesday Book tenants-in-chief. It is listed in Domesday Book as the 39th of his 58 Devonshire manors, and was held by him in demesne.

=== Little Washfield ===
The tenant in chief of Little Washfield as listed in the Domesday Book of 1086 was the Norman magnate Ralph de Paynell, Sheriff of Yorkshire, one of William the Conqueror's Devon Domesday Book tenants-in-chief. It is listed as the ninth of his ten Devonshire manors held in-chief. His tenant at Washfield was Gerard, himself a tenant-in-chief of two manors within Tiverton Hundred, who also held from him the nearby manor of Little Tiverton ("Great" Tiverton having been a royal manor since Saxon times). Gerard's own two manors later passed to the feudal barons of Plympton, lords of Tiverton Castle, which castle was given by King Henry I to Richard de Redvers, Earl of Devon. The eldest son of Ralph de Paynell was Ralph FitzPayne of Dart, who at the time of the Domesday Book held the manors of Dart and Worth, the latter in the parish of Washfield, from the overlord William of Poilley ( 21,6&14).

Ralph FitzPayne died without male progeny when his younger brother Reginaldus inherited his manor of Worth and making it his seat adopted the surname "de Worth". His descendants in a direct male line, later known as Worth, remained seated at Worth until 1880 on the death without male progeny of Reginald Worth. This makes the Worth family one of the longest lived and longest seated on its original seat in the history of Devon. It thus compares in these aspects to the continuing families of Fulford and Kelly.

Another ancient gentry family situated within the parish of Washfield was Barby.

== Sources ==
- Thorn, Caroline & Frank, (eds.) Domesday Book, (Morris, John, gen.ed.) Vol. 9, Devon, Parts 1 & 2, Phillimore Press, Chichester, 1985
- Vivian, Lt.Col. J.L., (Ed.) The Visitations of the County of Devon: Comprising the Heralds' Visitations of 1531, 1564 & 1620, Exeter, 1895
