= Manor of Loxhore =

Coordinates: 51°08′N 3°59′W

The Manor of Loxhore was a manor in the parish of Loxhore, North Devon, England.

== Descent of the manor ==
=== de Meulles ===
In the Domesday Book of 1086 it was a double manor, part of the historic Shirwell Hundred and was one of the 176 landholdings in Devon held in-chief by Baldwin de Meulles, Sheriff of Devon, who held the largest fiefdom in Devon and was the first feudal baron of Okehampton. These two holdings are thought to correspond to today's division of the parish into (Higher) Loxhore, where is situated the parish church, and Lower Loxhore, two miles south in the valley bottom of a small tributary stream of the River Yeo. Prior to the Norman Conquest of 1066 the part called Lochesore was held by the Saxon Doleswif, whilst the other, called Locheshore, the entry following it, was held by Wulfward. Before 1066 both paid tax at the same sum, for 1/2 a hide, and both were valued in 1086 at 20 shillings. Wulfward's former holding contained more arable land, and 4 more villagers, but less pasture and woodland than Doleswif's. Wulfward's holding also contained 4 acres of alder-grove, the presence of which wetland-loving trees may suggest his estate was Lower Loxhore, and that Doleswif held the estate on higher ground where now stands the parish church. Baldwin de Meulles' tenant of both holdings as listed in Domesday Book was "Robert de Beaumont".

=== Beaumont ===
In the Domesday Book of 1086 the twin holdings of Loxhore were two of at least four manors held in Devon by the Norman magnate Robert de Beaumont, 1st Earl of Leicester, Count of Meulan (c. 1040/50-1118) as a mesne lord from Baldwin de Meulles. William the Conqueror had granted Robert about 91 English manors in several counties as recompense for his service in the Norman conquest of England. Loxhore, along with Ashford (east of Heanton Punchardon) and Shirwell, stayed for many generations within the Beaumont family.

=== Beaumont of Devon ===
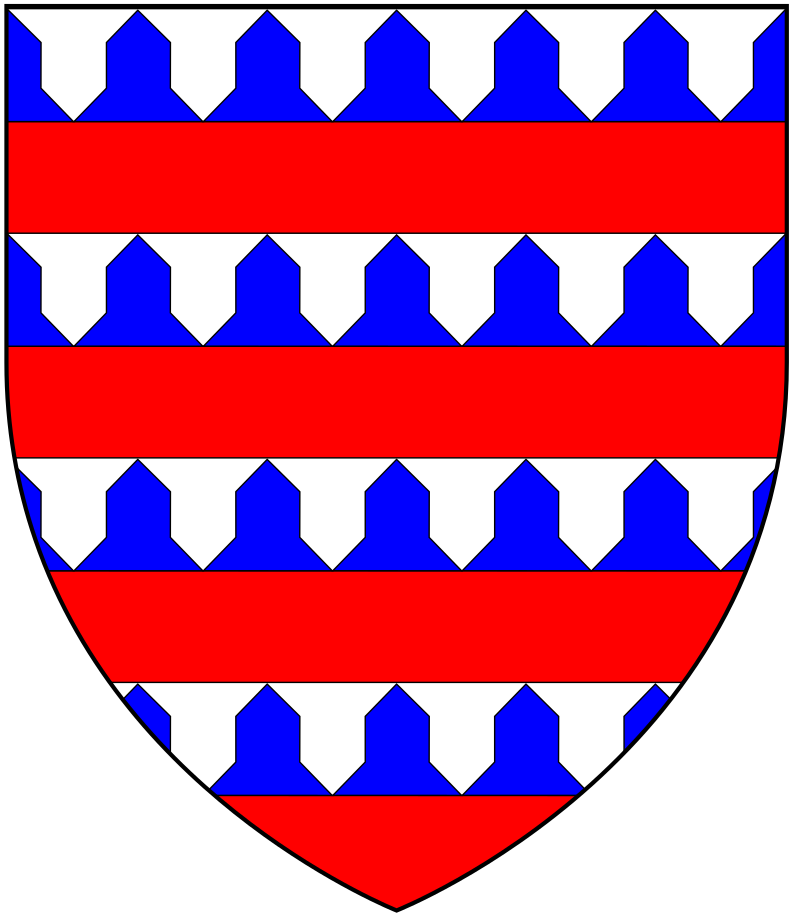
Arms of Beaumont of Youlston adopted at the start of the age of heraldry, (c. 1220 - 1215): Barry of six vair and gules. These arms can be seen on the monument in Gittisham Church, Devon, to Henry Beaumont (died 1590/1), also on the monument in Atherington Church, Devon, of Sir John Bassett (died 1529) of Umberleigh. They are the same arms as quartered for Coucy 1st & 4th as shown in the Gelre Armorial (c. 1370 - 1414) by Enguerrand VII, Lord of Coucy, 1st Earl of Bedford (1340–1397). The only previous holder of that Earldom was Hugh de Beaumont, 3rd son of Robert de Beaumont who held Shirwell & Loxhore

The earliest positively identifiable descendant of the Domesday tenant Robert de Beaumont was the 13th-century Sir Richard Beaumont, whose family had long been seated at the capital estate of Youlston within their adjacent manor of Shirwell. His eldest son and heir was Philip Beaumont (died c. 1272), of Youlston, and his younger son was William Beaumont "of Sabrecot" (i.e."Sepscott"), to whom he granted the manor of Loxhore. Sepscott survives today as an estate about 3 miles south of Youlston, and 7 miles south-west of Loxhore Church, and was anciently known as Sabrecot, Shebescote et al., and this branch of the family eventually inherited Shirwell also, on the failure of the senior male line. Philip Beaumont (died c. 1272), of Youlston married Ermengard Punchardon (originally de Pont-Chardon), daughter and co-heiress of Sir John Punchardon of Heanton Punchardon in Devon. His son was Sir John Beaumont (died 1330), of Youlston, MP for Devon in 1326, who married Alice Scudamore. His son was John Beaumont who married Alice, of unknown family. His only son and heir was William Beaumont, who died without progeny leaving his sister Joan Beaumont, the wife of Sir James Chudleigh, as his heiress. She too died without progeny and the Beaumont estates, now enlarged by the addition of the Punchardon lands, passed to her cousin John Beaumont (died 1378/80), of Sepscott, grandson of William Beaumont, who had been granted Loxhore by his father Sir Richard Beaumont, and son of Richard Beaumont. John Beaumont married Joane Crawthorne (or Crawstone), the heiress of her grandfather Sir Robert Stockey, MP in 1318. He purchased the North Devon manor of Parkham. Their son was William Beaumont, Sheriff of Devon in 1399, who held the Castle and Borough of Barnstaple. He further increased the family's estates by marrying Isabel Willington, daughter of Sir John Willington of Umberleigh, and co-heiress of her brother John Willington (died 1396). Their son was Sir Thomas Beaumont (1401–1450), born at the Willington manor of Yate in Gloucestershire. He married twice, the offspring of which two marriages became successively heirs to his estates. Firstly he married Phillipa Dynham, daughter of Sir John Dynham and aunt to John Dynham, 1st Baron Dynham (died 1501)

== Sources ==
- Beaumont, Edward T., The Beaumonts in History. A.D. 850-1850. Oxford, c. 1929, (privately published), Chapter 5, pp.56-63, The Devonshire Family
