= Newenham Abbey =

Ruined abbey in Devon, England

Coordinates: 50.7750°N 3.0000°W

Newenham Abbey (alias Newnham) was a Cistercian abbey founded in 1247 by Reginald II de Mohun (1206–1258) on land within his manor of Axminster in Devon, England. The site of the ruined abbey is a short distance south-west of the town of Axminster.

== History ==
The manor of Axminster was one of the many Devonshire possessions of William Brewer (died 1226), granted to him by King John (1199-1216). His only surviving son died without progeny, when his eventual heirs became his daughters, the fourth of whom, Alice Brewer, sister and co-heiress of William Brewer, feudal baron of Horsley, Derbyshire, in 1205 married (as her first husband) Reginald I de Mohun (1185–1213) feudal baron of Dunster, of Dunster Castle in Somerset. The first William Brewer had founded Torre Abbey in Devon in 1196 on his manor of Tor Brewer. Alice Brewer brought to her husband a great estate, including Tor Brewer (later renamed Tor Mohun, the site of the modern town of Torquay), and "is set down among the benefactors to the new Cathedral Church of Salisbury, having contributed thereto all the marble necessary for the building thereof for twelve years."

The son and heir of Reginald I de Mohun by Alice Brewer was Reginald II de Mohun (1206–1258) who in January 1247 granted a part of his manor of Axminster for the founding of Newnnham Abbey. The foundation charter was witnessed by Richard Blund, Bishop of Exeter. The mother house of Newenham was Beaulieu Abbey. Reginald II de Mohun bequeathed his manor and hundred of Axminster to Newnham Abbey.

It was dedicated to God and the Virgin Mary for an abbot and twelve monks of the Cistercian Order, who were directed by the charter to pray for the soul of the founder, for the souls of his kindred, his ancestors and successors. The Latin foundation charter included the following words:

Anno gratiae 1246 8 idis Januar(ii) regnant(e) Hen(rico) fil(io) Johan(nis), Reginaldus Mohun, filius Reginaldi et Alicia(e) Brewer, fundavit Abbathiam de Newnham in maner(io) de Axminster comitatu Devon(iae) ("In the year of grace 1246 on the 8 Ides of January, with (King) Henry (III) reigning, son of (King) John, Reginald de Mohun, son of Reginald and of Alice Brewer, founded the Abbey of Newnham in his manor of Axminster in the County of Devon").

The Abbey suffered greatly at the time of the Black Death in 1349, losing almost all its monks. Knowles and Hadcock state that twenty monks and three lay brothers died, leaving only the abbot and two monks alive. In 1377 there were seven monks.

=== Dissolution ===
During the Dissolution of the Monasteries its annual income was assessed at £231 14 shillings 4 pence and it was formally dissolved on 8 March 1539. Abbot Gill and nine monks were granted pensions dating from 9 March 1539. It was purchased from the crown by Thomas Howard, 3rd Duke of Norfolk (1473-1554) whose younger great-grandson Lord William Howard (1563-1640) (third son of Thomas Howard, 4th Duke of Norfolk (d.1572)) sold it to John Petre, 1st Baron Petre (1549–1613) of Writtle, Essex, and it descended to his son William Petre, 2nd Baron Petre (1575–1637), the owner in the time of Pole (d.1635).

The Abbey was already in ruins at the time of the visit by Rev John Swete in 1795, as part of his "Picturesque Tours" and he made two watercolour paintings of the buildings which survive in the Devon Record Office. The remains of the abbey have now been scheduled as an Ancient Monument. Some fragments of the abbey can be found re-used in buildings in Axminster.

== See also ==
- Late medieval domes
