= Cheldon =

Village in Devon, England

Coordinates: 50.906127°N 3.80337°W

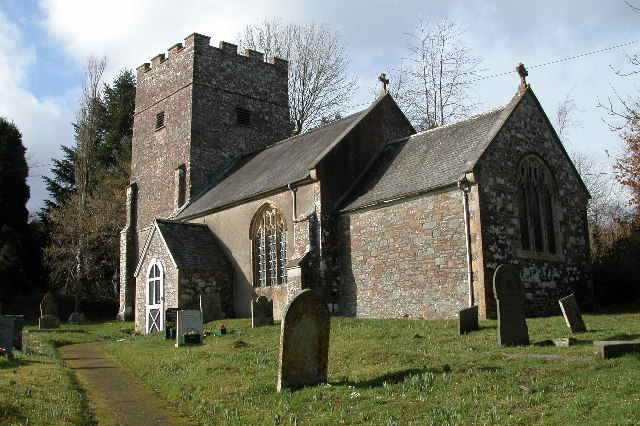

- Location within Devon
- OS grid reference: SS733134
- Civil parish: Chulmleigh
- District: North Devon
- Shire county: Devon
- Region: South West
- Country: England
- Sovereign state: United Kingdom
- Police: Devon and Cornwall
- Fire: Devon and Somerset
- Ambulance: South Western

Cheldon is a village and former civil parish, 17 miles (27 km) north-west of Exeter, now in the parish of Chulmleigh, in the North Devon district, in the county of Devon, England. In 1961, the parish had a population of 32.

== Features ==
Cheldon has a church called St Mary with a 12th-century font and 16th century bells.

== History ==
The name "Cheldon" means "Ceadela's hill". Cheldon was recorded in the Domesday Book as Cadeldone/Cheledone/Cha(d)eledona. The parish was historically in the Witheridge hundred. On 1 April 1986, the civil parish was abolished and merged with Chulmleigh.
