= Huntshaw =

Village in Devon, England

Coordinates: 50.986°N 4.131°W

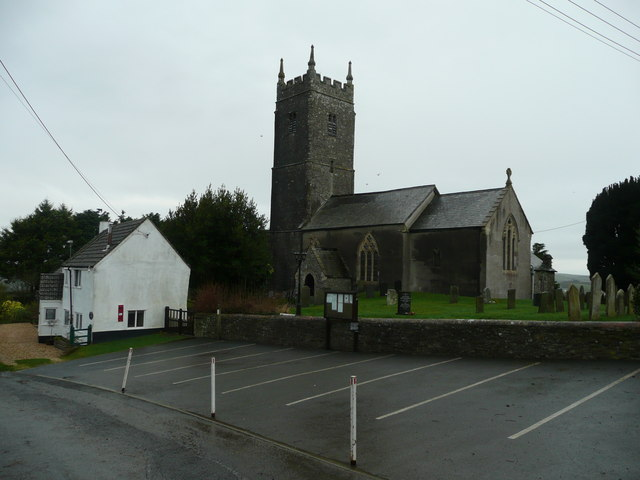
- St Mary Magdalene's Church

- Location within Devon
- Population: 134 (2011 UK Census)
- OS grid reference: SS 50551 22859
- Civil parish: Huntshaw
- District: Torridge
- Shire county: Devon
- Region: South West
- Country: England
- Sovereign state: United Kingdom
- Post town: Torrington
- Postcode district: EX38
- Police: Devon and Cornwall
- Fire: Devon and Somerset
- Ambulance: South Western

Huntshaw is a village and civil parish in the Torridge district, in the county of Devon, England. It is 2.5 north north east of Great Torrington.

In 2011 the population of the civil parish of Huntshaw was 134, although it was 143 in 1901 and 212 in 1801.

The parish church of St Mary Magdalene is Grade II* Listed. There is a mast in Huntshaw called Huntshaw Cross transmitting station.

Other features in Huntshaw include Huntshaw Barton, Berry Castle and Huntshaw Mill Bridge which is Grade II listed, although some of it is in Weare Giffard CP.

== History ==
The name "Huntshaw" means 'Hun's wood' or 'honey wood', possibly because of the sweetness of the water or swarms of bees in the nearby woods. Huntshaw was recorded in the Domesday Book as Huneseue.

Huntshaw was in the Fremington hundred, in 1894 Huntshaw became part of Torrington Rural District. In 1974 Huntshaw became part of Torridge non-metropolitan district in the non-metropolitan county of Devon.
