= Siege of Exeter (1642) =

Siege during the First English Civil War

Coordinates: 50.716667°N 3.533333°W

The siege of Exeter (1642)
- Part of First English Civil War
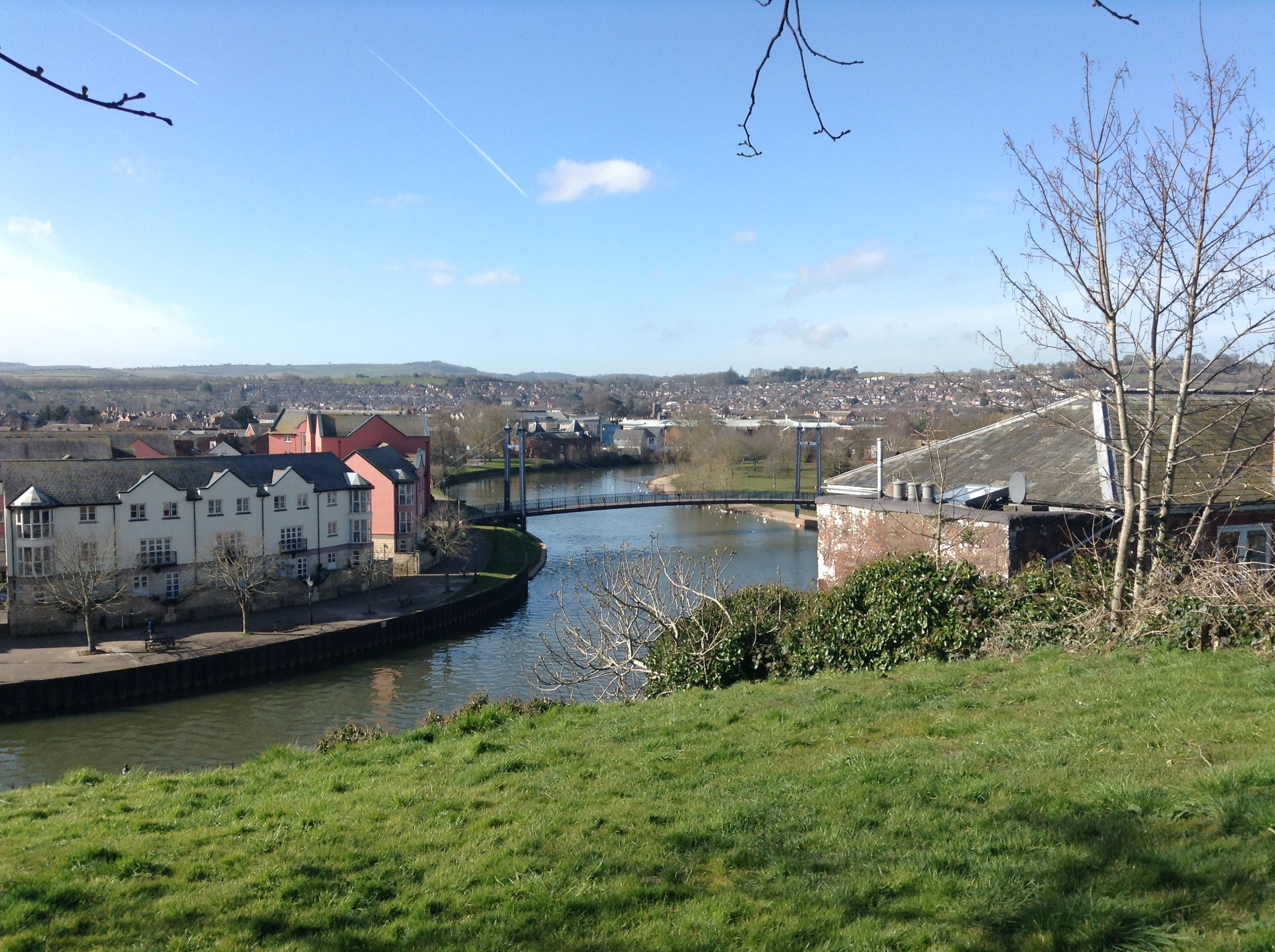
- Exeter Quay; its position on the River Exe made Exeter an important transport hub
Date	Late December 1642 – Early January 1643
Location	Exeter, Devon
Result	Parliamentary victory

Belligerents
Royalists	(Kingdom of England) Parliamentarians

Commanders and leaders
Sir Ralph Hopton; Sir Bevil Grenville	(Kingdom of England) Earl of Stamford (Kingdom of Scotland) Colonel Ruthven

Strength
3,000	

Casualties and losses
Minimal	Minimal

The siege of Exeter (1642) or first siege of Exeter took place during the First English Civil War from late December 1642 to early January 1643 when Royalists led by Sir Ralph Hopton attempted to capture the port of Exeter from the Parliamentarians.

== Background ==
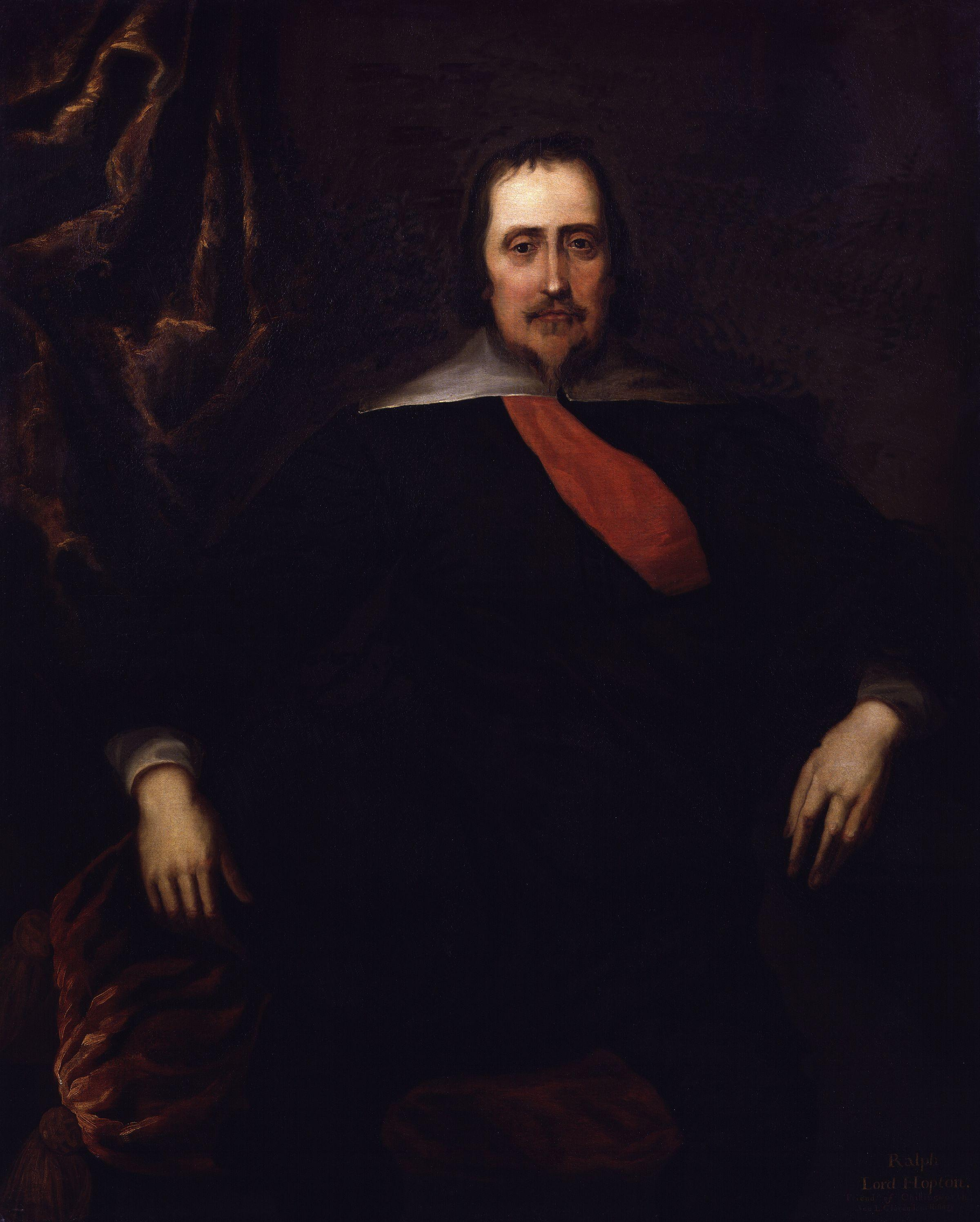
Royalist commander in the west, Sir Ralph Hopton

When the war began in August 1642, Parliamentary forces secured most of southern England, including the ports of Southampton and Dover, as well as the bulk of the Royal Navy. After capturing Portsmouth in September, they controlled every major port from Plymouth to Hull, hampering Royalist efforts to import arms and men from Europe.

By the end of September, most of Devon was held by Parliament, while Royalists under Sir Ralph Hopton secured Cornwall. In the early stages of the war, most soldiers on both sides were poorly trained and equipped militia. An exception was Plymouth, where the garrison was commanded by Colonel William Ruthven, and a contingent of experienced Scots mercenaries; their ship stopped to pick up supplies returning from Ireland in early October, and the Parliamentary town council hired them to defend the city. Ruthven easily repulsed attempts to take Plymouth

In early November Hopton crossed the River Tamar, heading for Exeter. Royalist sympathisers told him that Exeter was largely undefended, although the town itself was controlled by supporters of Parliament. Its capture meant control of a vital port on the southern coast, an important export point for Devon wool. Its position on the River Exe also provided access to internal waterways, vital for transporting bulk supplies. It could also provide a base for Royalist privateers.

By the time Hopton arrived at Exeter on 18 November, it had been occupied by a small force of Parliamentary cavalry under Captain Alexander Pym. After a brief exchange of artillery fire, the Royalists retreated to Tavistock and made another attempt on Plymouth.

== Siege ==
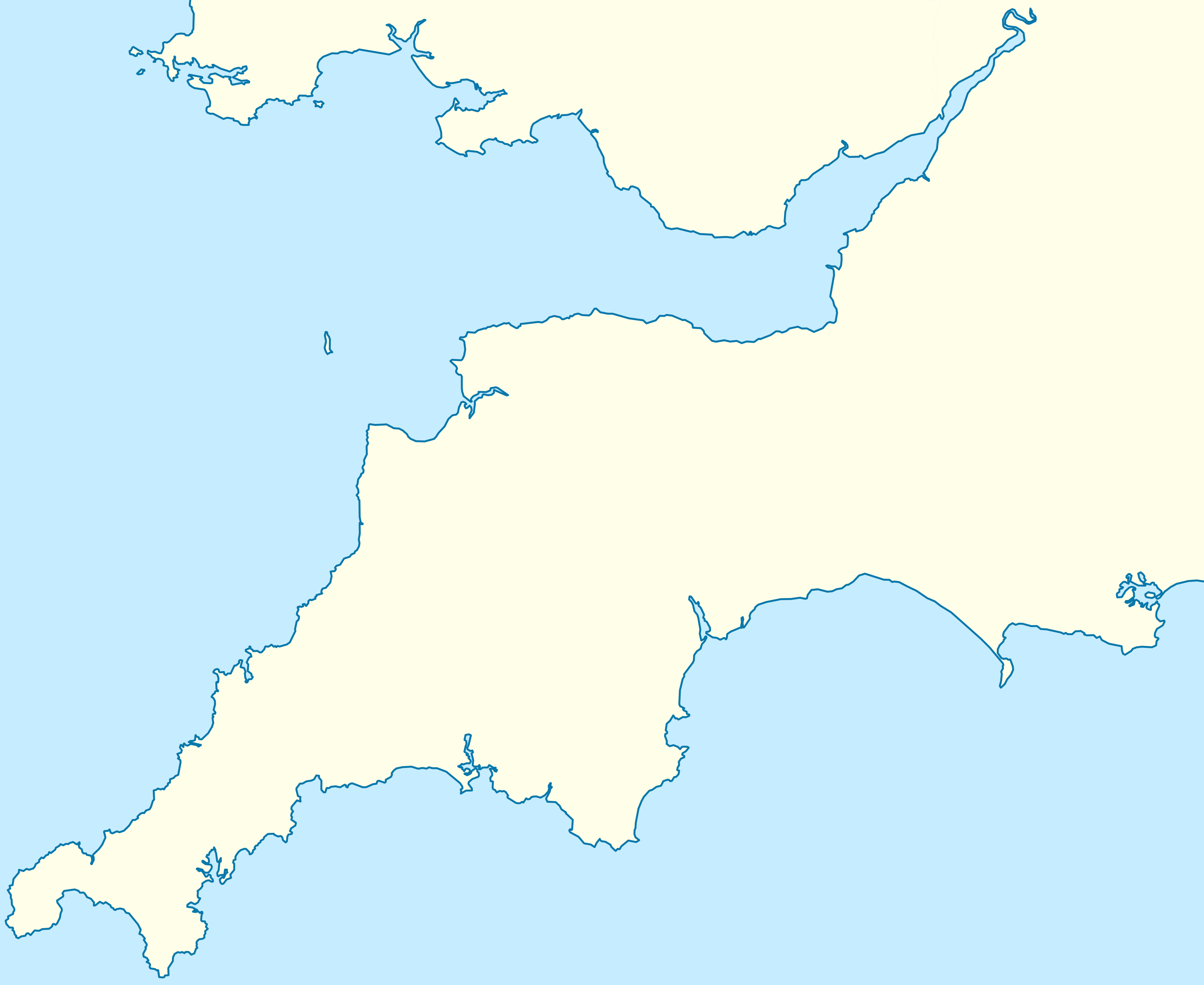
Western England, 1642 to 1646

At the end of December, Hopton returned to Exeter and besieged the city. The Royalist forces also attacked and captured the villages of Topsham and Powderham on the River Exe blocking Exeter's resupply from the sea. Hopton then called upon the Parliamentarians to surrender.

Colonel Ruthven, however, had anticipated that Exeter would be sieged and reinforced Exeter beforehand. As such, the Parliamentarians rejected the call to surrender. Surprisingly, it was the Royalists who could not sustain the siege. Reportedly after less than a fortnight, Hopton found that his troops were short of supplies and threatening to mutiny. Hopton ended the siege in early January and retreated into Cornwall. Ruthven pursued him, hoping to capture the Royalist artillery, but was halted by a successful rearguard action at Bridestowe.

== Aftermath ==
Royalist victories at Braddock Down in January, then Stratton in April, destroyed the Parliamentary field army in Cornwall and Devon. This was followed by Roundway Down, on 13 July, arguably their most comprehensive victory of the war. On 26 July, Prince Rupert stormed Bristol, gaining the second largest city in Britain.

This secured Royalist control of the West Country, with the exception of isolated ports like Exeter, which was captured in September 1643; they held it until April 1646.
