= Crediton (disambiguation) =

Crediton is a town and parish in Devon, England.

Crediton may also refer to:

== Devon, England ==
- Crediton (hundred), an ancient administrative division containing the town
- Crediton railway station, serving the town
- Crediton United A.F.C., a football club based in the town
- Crediton Rural District, an administrative division from 1894 to 1974
- Crediton Hamlets, a civil parish outside the town

== Other meanings ==
- Crediton, Queensland, Australia, a rural locality
- Crediton, Ontario, Canada, a small rural community
