= Cunnilear Camp =

Iron Age hill fort in Devon, England

Coordinates: 51.1141°N 3.9826°W

Cunnilear Camp is an Iron Age hill fort close to the village of Loxhore in Devon, England. It is on a hillside forming a promontory above the River Yeo to the south of the village, at approximately 110 metres (360 ft) above sea level.
