= Berry Castle, Huntshaw =

Iron Age hill fort in Devon, England

Coordinates: 50.9793°N 4.1457°W

Berry Castle is an Iron Age Hill fort in the civil parish of Huntshaw, close to Weare Giffard in Devon, England, to the north of Great Torrington.

== Description ==
The fort takes the form of an oval enclosure situated on a promontory in Huntshaw Wood some 95 metres (312 ft) above sea level. In 2015, tree clearance revealed that the enclosure is rectangular in shape with entrances at either end, and may be a Roman camp or a local example of a Neolithic sky burial enclosure.
