= Powderham =

Coordinates: 50.6495°N 3.4632°W

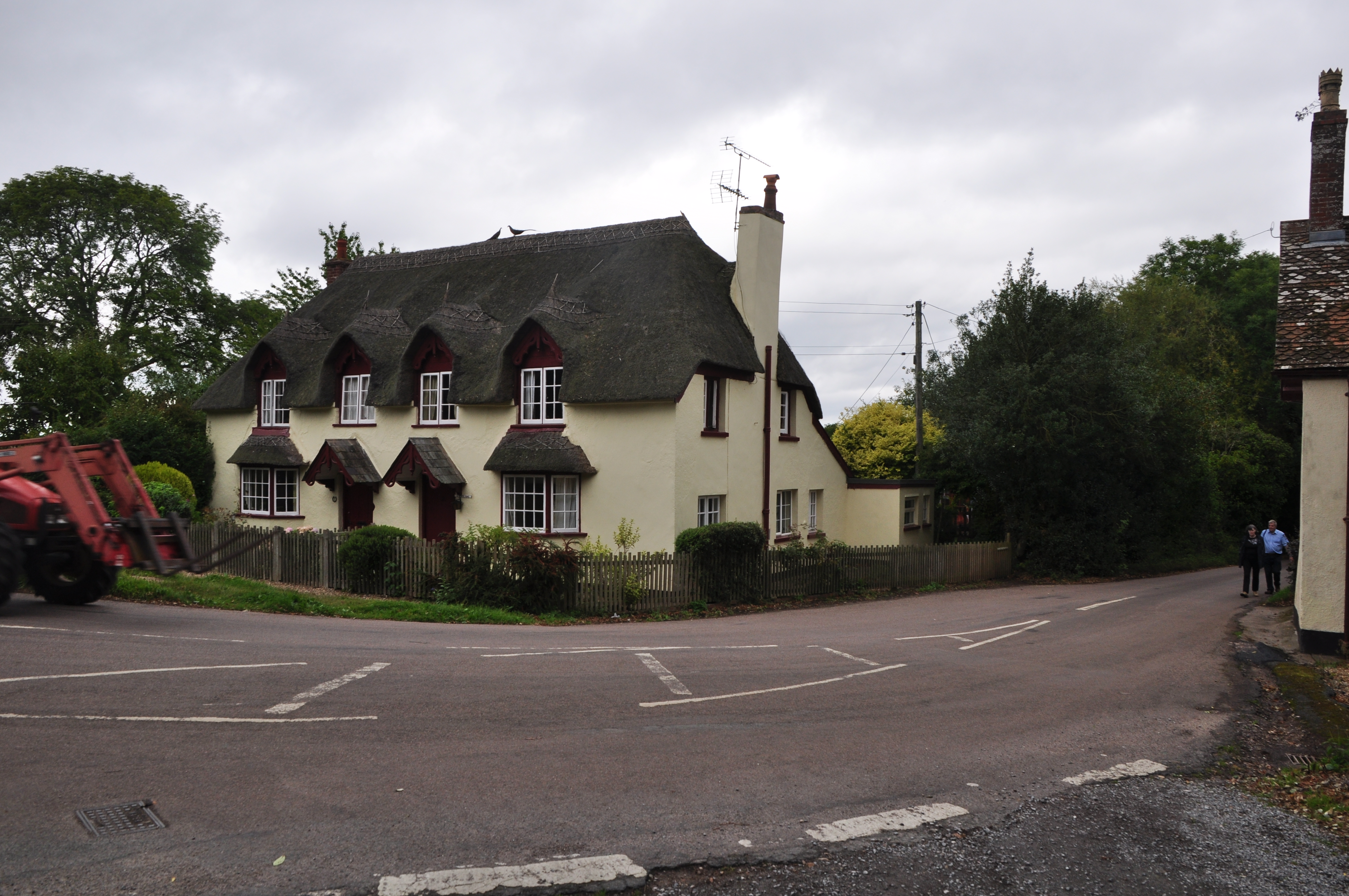
- Church Road

- Location within Devon
- Area: 6.026 km^{2} (2.327 sq mi)
- Population: 99 (2021 census)
  - Density: 16/km^{2} (41/sq mi)
- Civil parish: Powderham
- District: Teignbridge
- Shire county: Devon
- Region: South West
- Country: England
- Sovereign state: United Kingdom
- Police: Devon and Cornwall
- Fire: Devon and Somerset
- Ambulance: South Western

Powderham is a village and civil parish in the Teignbridge district, in the county of Devon, England. It is about 6 miles from Exeter. The parish borders Exminster, Kenn, Kenton and Woodbury. In 2021 the parish had a population of 99. Powderham has a parish meeting rather than a parish council. There are 24 listed buildings in Powderham. Powderham has a castle called Powderham Castle and a church called St Clement's Church.

== History ==
The name "Powderham" means 'Marshy hemmed-in land' and is Old English. Powderham was recorded in the Domesday Book as Poldreham. The village is one of the possible sources of the surname Powderham. Powderham was in the Exminster hundred. In 1894 Powderham became part of St Thomas Rural District. In 1974 Powderham became part of Teignbridge non-metropolitan district in the non-metropolitan county of Devon.
