= Loxhore =

Village and civil parish in Devon, England

Coordinates: 50°53′N 4°10′W

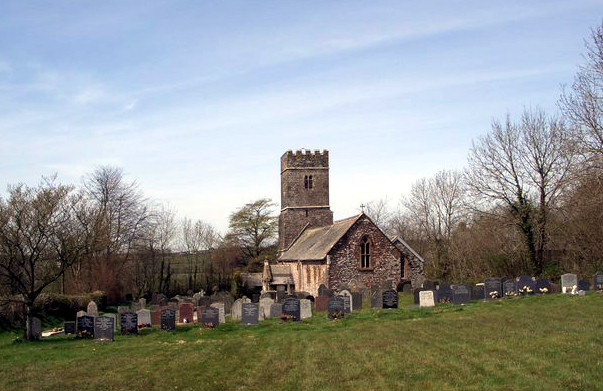
- Loxhore parish church

- Location within Devon
- Population: 153 (2001 census)
- Civil parish: Loxhore
- District: North Devon
- Shire county: Devon
- Region: South West
- Country: England
- Sovereign state: United Kingdom
- Police: Devon and Cornwall
- Fire: Devon and Somerset
- Ambulance: South Western

Loxhore is a small village, civil parish and former manor in the local government district of North Devon in the county of Devon, England. The parish, which lies about five miles north-east of the town of Barnstaple, is surrounded clockwise from the north by the parishes of Arlington, Bratton Fleming and Shirwell. In 2001 its population was 153, down from the 202 residents it had in 1901.

The parish church, dedicated to St Michael, was built in the 15th century and restored in several stages from before 1844 to c. 1900. Despite the restoration it retains several notable features including its screen, two pillars of the north arcade which are of oak instead of the usual stone, a decorated 16th-century font cover, and monuments to the Hammond family.

Other notable features in the parish are Roborough Castle, Cunnilear Camp (an Iron Age hill fort), a small motte on a hill with wide views, and the small house of Hill which has late medieval origins. The Manor of Loxhore was once owned by the de Meulles and Beaumont families, whose main seat was at Youlston Park in the adjacent Shirwell parish.
