= Fremington Hundred =

Ancient administrative unit of Devon, England

The hundred of Fremington was the name of one of thirty two ancient administrative units of Devon, England.

The parishes in the hundred were:

- Alverdiscott
- Fremington
- Great Torrington
- Horwood
- Huntshaw
- Instow
- Newton Tracey
- Roborough
- St Giles in the Wood
- Tawstock
- Westleigh

== See also ==
- List of hundreds of England and Wales - Devon
