= Hartland Hundred =

Ancient administrative unit of Devon, England

The hundred of Hartland was the name of one of thirty two ancient administrative units of Devon, England.

The parishes in the hundred were: Clovelly, Hartland, Welcombe, Woolfardisworthy (West) and Yarnscombe.

== See also ==
- List of hundreds of England and Wales - Devon
