= Exminster Hundred =

Ancient administrative unit of Devon, England

The hundred of Exminster was the name of one of thirty two ancient administrative units of Devon, England. It was listed in the Domesday survey of 1086 as comprising 20 settlements.

The parishes in the hundred were:

- Ashcombe
- Ashton
- Bishopsteignton
- Chudleigh
- Dawlish
- Doddiscombsleigh
- Dunchideock
- East Teignmouth
- Exminster
- Ide
- Kenn
- Kenton
- Mamhead
- Powderham
- Shillingford St George
- Trusham
- West Teignmouth.

== See also ==
- List of hundreds of England and Wales - Devon
