= Witheridge Hundred =

Ancient administrative unit of Devon, England

Witheridge Hundred was the name of one of thirty two ancient administrative units of Devon, England.

The parishes in the hundred were: Bishops Nympton, Cheldon, Chulmleigh, Creacombe, Cruwys Morchard, East Worlington, Highley St Mary, Kings Nympton, Mariansleigh, Meshaw, Oakford, Puddington, Rackenford, Romansleigh, Rose Ash, Stoodleigh, Templeton, Thelbridge, Washford Pyne, West Worlington, Witheridge and Woolfardisworthy (East)

== See also ==
- List of hundreds of England and Wales - Devon
