= North Tawton and Winkleigh Hundred =

Ancient administrative unit of Devon, England

North Tawton and Winkleigh Hundred was the name of one of thirty two ancient administrative units of Devon, England. The status of Winkleigh is uncertain. Until the 18th century, it was a separate hundred but in the nineteenth century it became part of North Tawton and was known as the Hundred of North Tawton and Winkleigh.

The parishes in the hundred were: Ashreigney, Atherington, Bondleigh, Bow, Broad Nymet, Brushford, Burrington, Chawleigh, Clannaborough, Coldridge, Dolton, Dowland, Down St Mary, Eggesford, High Bickington, Lapford, North Tawton, Nymet Rowland, Wembworthy, Winkleigh and Zeal Monachorum,

== See also ==
- List of hundreds of England and Wales - Devon
- Church of All Saints, Winkleigh
