= Hayridge Hundred =

Ancient administrative unit of Devon, England

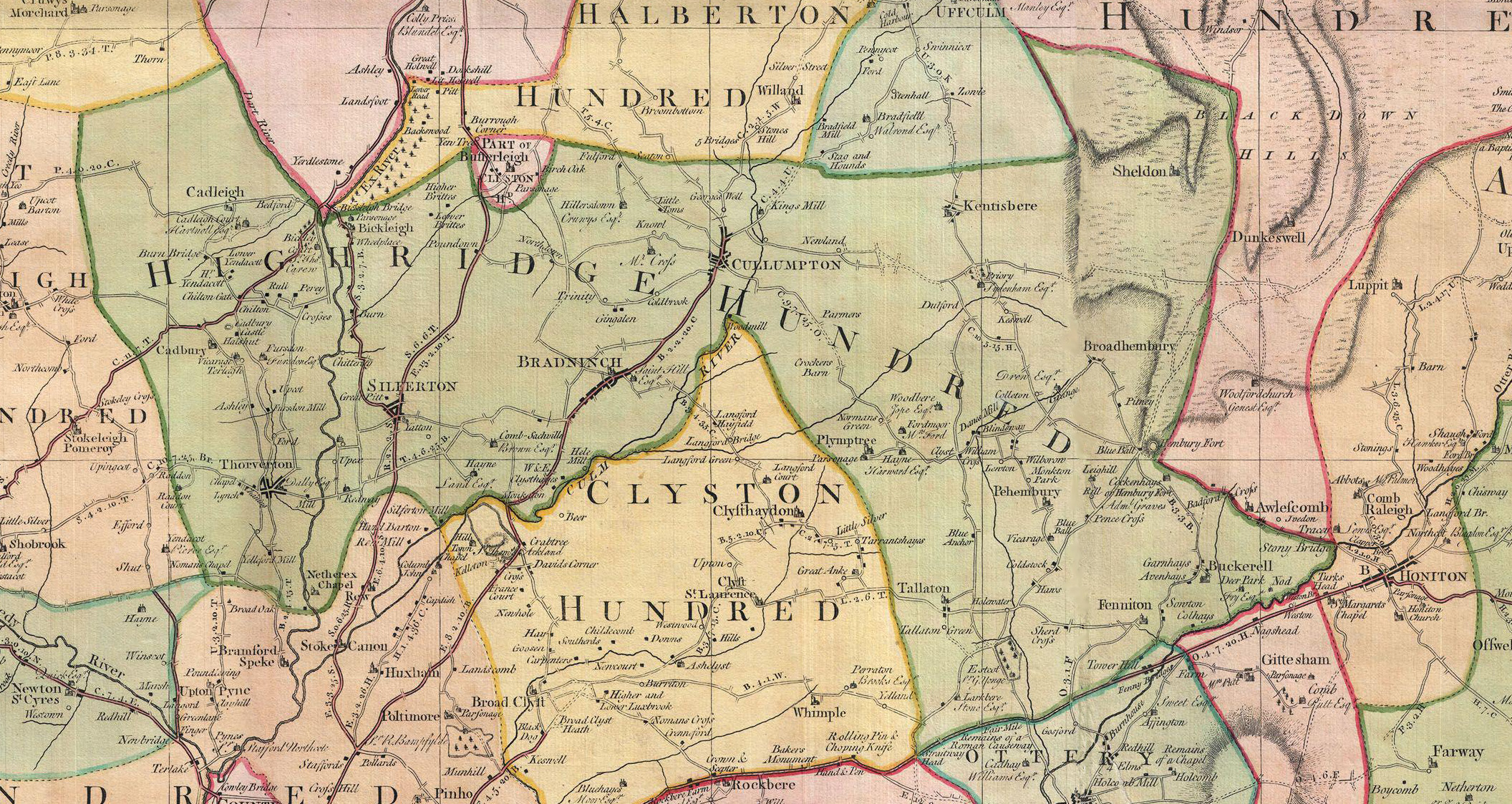
1765 map of the hundred

The hundred of Hayridge was the name of one of thirty two ancient administrative units of Devon, England. It was originally known as Sulfretona and this name was still used in the Geldroll of 1084 but two hundred years later it was called Harigg in the hundred Role of Edward I after the place where the hundred courts were held which is now Whorridge farm.

At the time of the Doomsday Survey there were 41 manors in the Hundred and the parishes in the hundred in the nineteenth century were: Bickleigh (near Tiverton); Blackborough; Bradninch; Broadhembury; Cadbury; Cadeleigh; Cullompton; Feniton; Kentisbeare; Netherexe; Payhembury; Plymtree; Rewe (part); Sheldon; Silverton; Talaton; Thorverton. According to White's History, Gazetteer, and Directory of Devonshire, (1850) it "Is of an irregular figure, extending about 16 miles from east to west, and varying from 9 to 6 in breadth."

== See also ==
- List of hundreds of England and Wales - Devon
