= West Budleigh Hundred =

Ancient administrative unit of Devon, England

West Budleigh Hundred was the name of one of thirty two ancient administrative units of Devon, England.

The parishes in the hundred were: Cheriton Fitzpaine, Poughill, Shobrooke, Stockleigh English, Stockleigh Pomeroy, Upton Hellions and Washfield

== See also ==
- List of hundreds of England and Wales - Devon

== Gallery ==
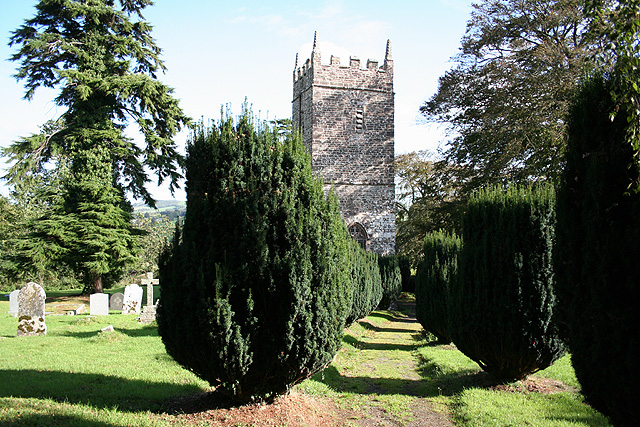
Stockleigh English
St Marys church
(since 1754)
