= Tavistock Hundred =

Ancient administrative unit of Devon, England

Tavistock Hundred was the name of one of thirty two ancient administrative units of Devon, England.

The parishes in the hundred were: Brentor, Milton Abbot and Tavistock

== See also ==
- List of hundreds of England and Wales - Devon
