= Ottery Hundred =

Ancient administrative unit of Devon, England

Ottery Hundred was the name of one of thirty two ancient administrative units of Devon, England.

The parish of Ottery St Mary was the only parish in this hundred.

== See also ==
- List of hundreds of England and Wales - Devon
