= Bampton Hundred =

Ancient administrative unit of Devon, England

The hundred of Bampton was the name of one of thirty two ancient administrative units of Devon, England.

The parishes in the hundred were: Bampton; Burlescombe; (part) Clayhanger; Hockworthy; Holcombe Rogus; Morebath and Uffculme.

== See also ==
- List of hundreds of England and Wales - Devon
