= Shirwell Hundred =

Ancient administrative unit of Devon, England

Shirwell Hundred was the name of one of thirty two ancient administrative units of Devon, England.

The parishes in the hundred were: Arlington, Brendon, Challacombe, Charles, Countisbury, High Bray, Loxhore, Lynton, Martinhoe, Parracombe, Shirwell and Stoke Rivers

== See also ==
- List of hundreds of England and Wales - Devon
