= Plympton Hundred =

Ancient administrative unit of Devon, England

Coordinates: 50°23′24″N 4°03′00″W

Plympton Hundred was the name of one of thirty two ancient administrative units of Devon, England.

The parishes in the hundred were: Brixton, Plympton St Mary, Plympton St Maurice, Plymstock, Revelstoke, Shaugh Prior, Wembury and Yealmpton

== See also ==
- List of hundreds of England and Wales - Devon
