= Haytor Hundred =

Ancient administrative unit of Devon, England

The hundred of Haytor was the name of one of thirty two ancient administrative units of Devon, England. The hundred covered the coastal area between the River Teign and River Dart. It was likely named after a lost village located somewhere between Totnes and Newton Abbot.

Also known as High Tor Hundred or Hey Tor Hundred in the 18th century, the 24 parishes in the hundred in the 19th century were: Abbotskerswell, Berry Pomeroy, Brixham All Saints, Brixham St Mary, Broadhempston, Buckland in the Moor, Churston Ferrers, Cockington, Coffinswell, Denbury, Ipplepen, Kingskerswell, Kingswear, Littlehempston, Marldon, Paignton, Staverton, Stoke Gabriel, Torbryan, Tormoham, Torquay St Marychurch, Widecombe in the Moor, Wolborough, and Woodland.

Most parishes of the hundred were previously part of the Domesday hundred of Kerswell. There were 38 places in the hundred of Kerswell in Domesday Book: Abbotskerswell, Afton, Aller, Battleford, Berry (Pomeroy), Blackslade, Brixham, Broadhempston, Buckland (-in-the-Moor), Cockington, Coffinswell, Coleton, Combe (Fishacre), Churston (Ferrers), Denbury, Dewdon, Dunstone, Edginswell, Galmpton, Goodrington, Ilsham, Ipplepen, Kingskerswell, Littlehempston, Loventor, Lupton, Natsworthy, Paignton, St Marychurch, Scobitor, (Shiphay) Collaton, Sparkwell, Spitchwick, Staverton, Torbryan, Tormoham, Wolborough and Woodhuish.

== See also ==
- List of hundreds of England and Wales - Devon
