= Crediton Hundred =

Ancient administrative unit of Devon, England

The hundred of Crediton was the name of one of thirty-two ancient administrative units of Devon, England.

The parishes in the hundred were: Colebrooke; Crediton; Kennerleigh; Morchard Bishop; Newton St Cyres and Sandford.

== See also ==
- List of hundreds of England and Wales - Devon
