= Axminster Hundred =

Ancient administrative unit of Devon, England

The hundred of Axminster was the name of one of thirty two ancient administrative units of Devon, England.

The parishes in the hundred were: Axminster; Axmouth; Combe Raleigh; Combpyne; Dalwood; Honiton; Kilmington; Luppitt; Membury; Musbury; Rousdon; Stockland; Thorncombe; Uplyme; Upottery; Yarcombe

== See also ==
- List of hundreds of England and Wales - Devon
