= Devon =

County of England

Devon Devonshire
- Non-metropolitan and ceremonial county
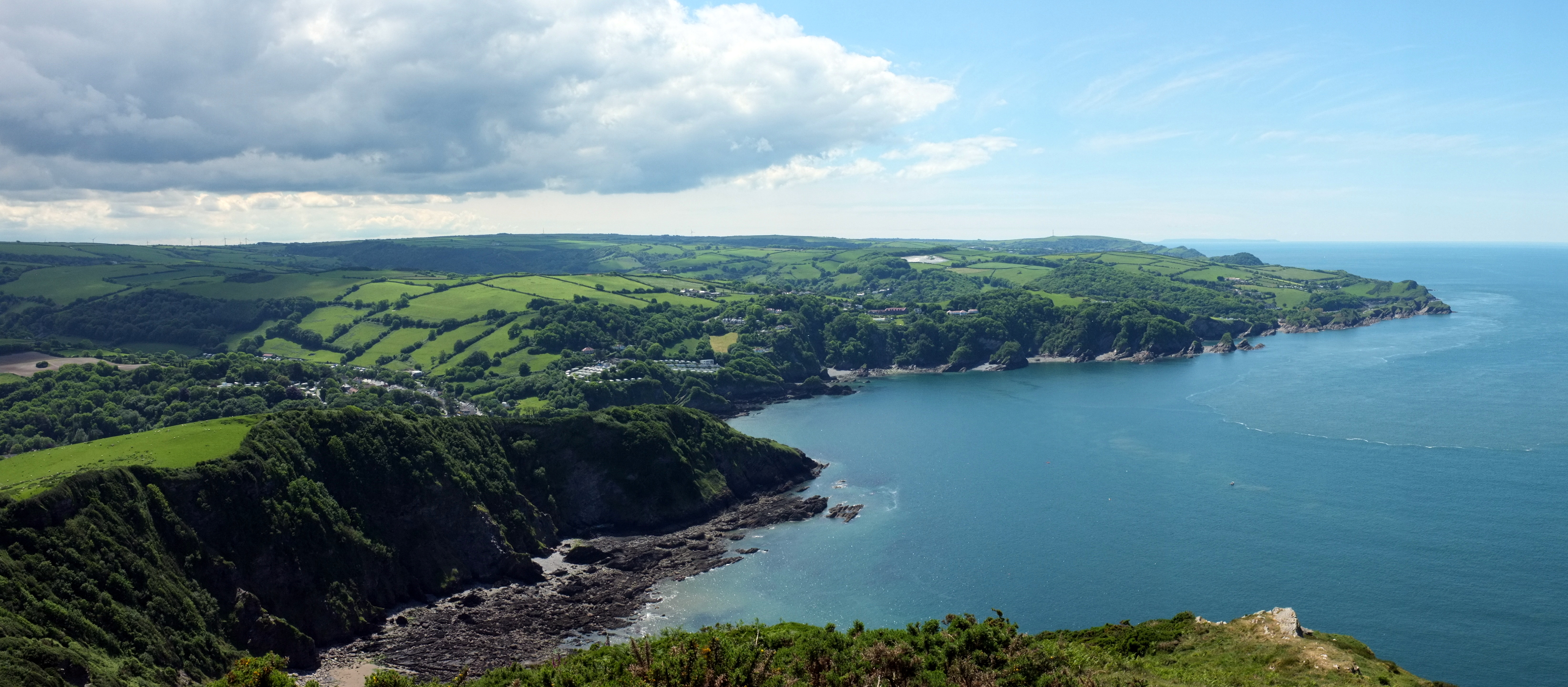
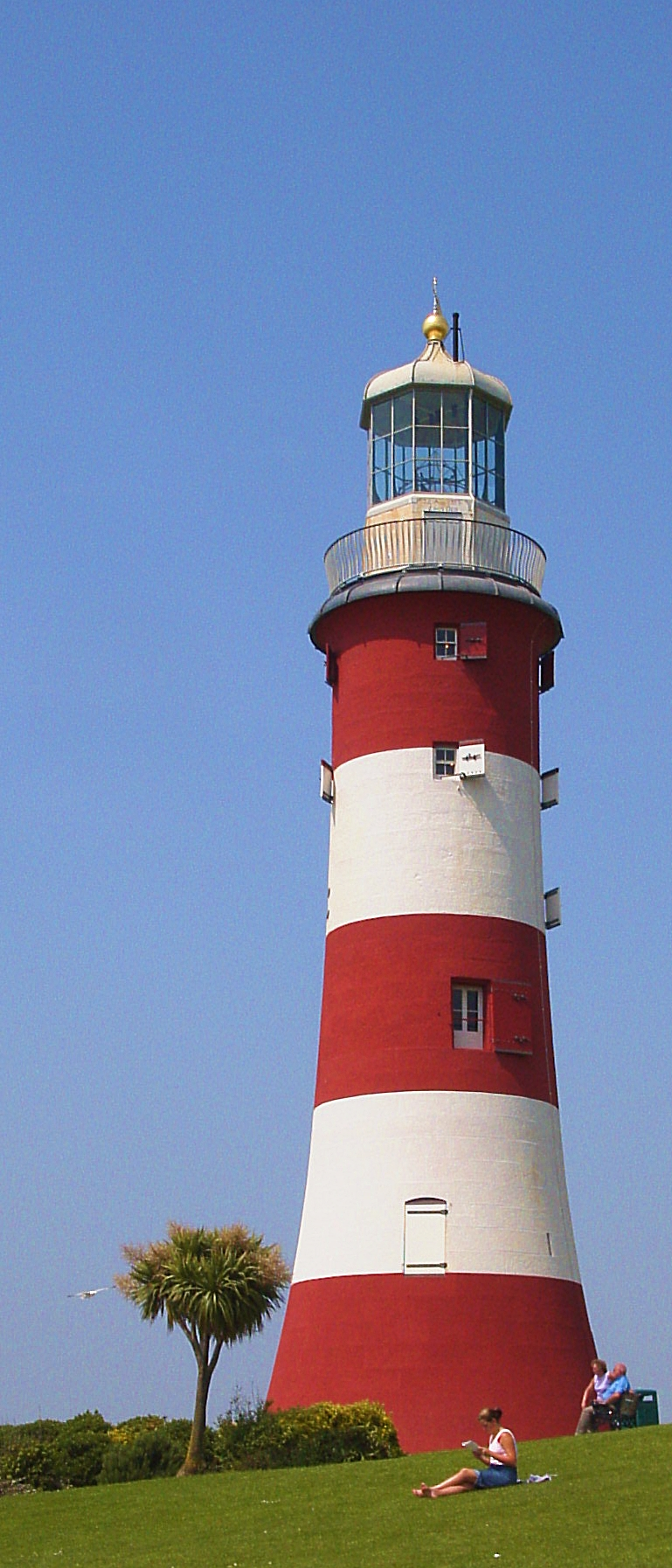
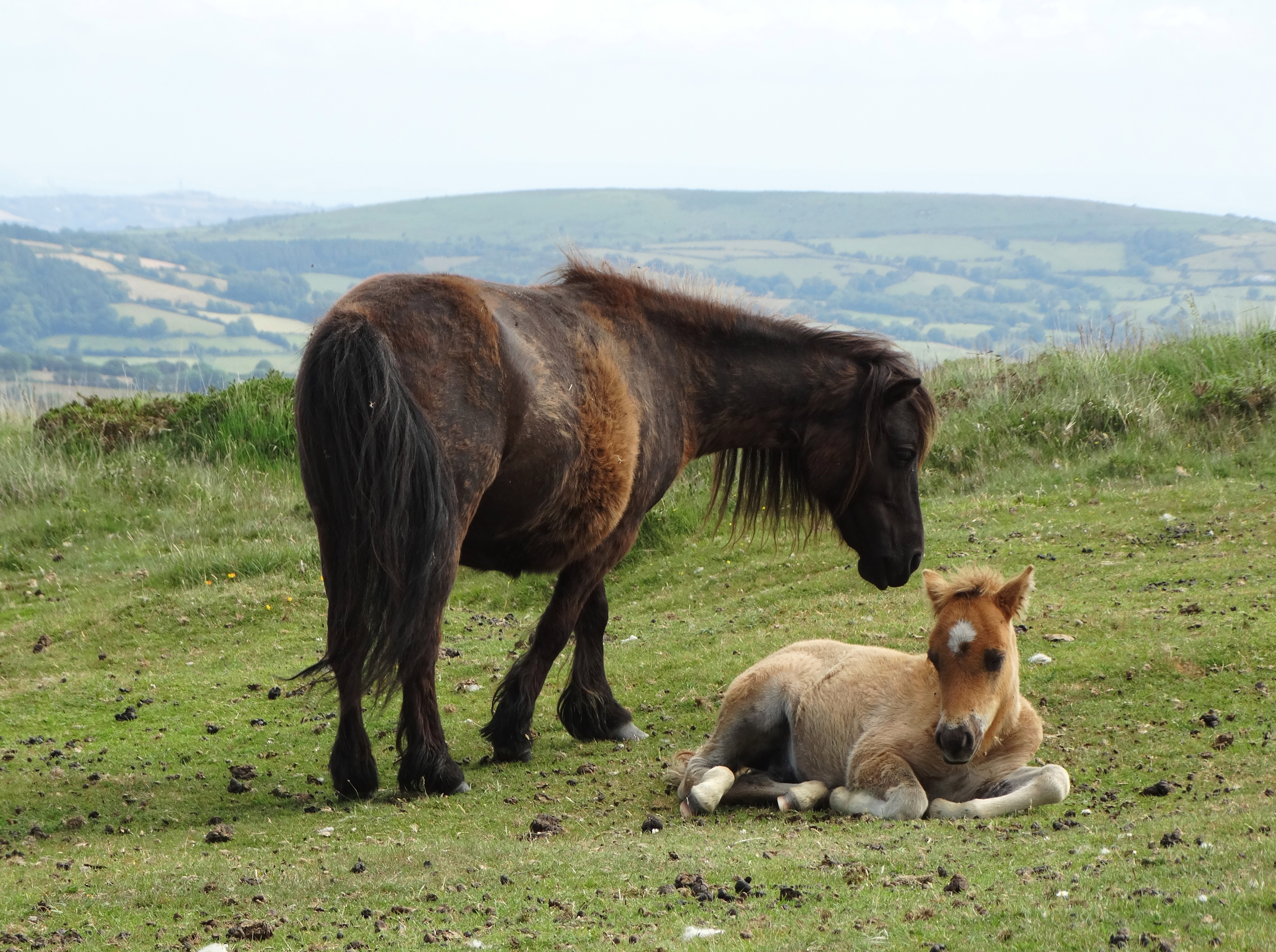
- Clockwise from top: the Devon coast at Combe Martin; ponies on Dartmoor; and Smeaton's Tower, Plymouth Hoe

- Devon within England
- Coordinates: 50°42′N 3°48′W
- Sovereign state: United Kingdom
- Constituent country: England
- Region: South West England
- Established: Ancient
- Time zone: UTC+0 (GMT)
  - Summer (DST): UTC+1 (BST)
- UK Parliament: List of MPs
- Police: Devon and Cornwall Police
- Fire: Devon and Somerset Fire and Rescue Service
- County town: Exeter
- Largest city: Plymouth
- Ceremonial county
- Lord Lieutenant: David Fursdon
- High Sheriff: Mark Picton Ansell
- Area: 6,707 km^{2} (2,590 sq mi)
  - Rank: 4th of 48
- Population (2024): 1,254,506
  - Rank: 11th of 48
  - Density: 187/km^{2} (480/sq mi)
- Non-metropolitan county
- County council: Devon County Council
- Control: No overall control
- Admin HQ: Exeter
- Area: 6,564 km^{2} (2,534 sq mi)
  - Rank: 1st of 21
- Population (2025): 845,541
  - Rank: 11th of 21
  - Density: 129/km^{2} (330/sq mi)
- ISO 3166-2: GB-DEV
- GSS code: E10000008
- ITL: UKK43
- Website: devon.gov.uk
- Unitary authorities
- Councils: Plymouth City Council; Torbay Council
- Districts
- Districts of Devon; Unitary district Non-metropolitan district
- Districts: List: North Devon; Torridge; Mid Devon; East Devon; Exeter; West Devon; Teignbridge; Plymouth; South Hams; Torbay

Devon (/ˈdɛvən/ DEV-ən; historically also known as Devonshire /-ʃɪər, -ʃər/ -sheer, -shər) is a ceremonial county in South West England. It is bordered by the Bristol Channel to the north, Somerset and Dorset to the east, the English Channel to the south, and Cornwall to the west. The city of Plymouth is the largest settlement.

The county has an area of 2,590 mi^{2} (6,700 km^{2}) and had an estimated population of 1,254,506 in 2024. The south of the county is more densely populated than the north, with Plymouth in the south-west and the city of Exeter in the south-east. The seaside resorts of Torquay and Paignton are adjacent to each other in the south. The largest town in the north is Barnstaple. For local government purposes, Devon comprises a non-metropolitan county, with eight districts, and the unitary authority areas of Plymouth and Torbay. Devon County Council and Torbay Council collaborate through a combined county authority.

Devon has a varied geography. It contains Dartmoor and part of Exmoor, two upland moors that are the source of most of the county's rivers, including the Taw, Dart, and Exe. The longest river in the county is the Tamar, which forms most of the border with Cornwall and rises in Devon's northwest hills. The southeast coast is part of the Jurassic Coast World Heritage Site, and characterised by tall cliffs that reveal the Triassic, Jurassic and Cretaceous geology of the region. The county gives its name to the Devonian geologic period, which includes the slates and sandstones of the north coast. Dartmoor and Exmoor have been designated national parks, and the county also contains, in whole or in part, five national landscapes. High Willhays (Dartmoor national park) is broadly recognised as the most southernly nuttall/hewitt mountain in the United Kingdom, standing at 621 m/ 2039 ft above sea level.

In the Iron Age, Roman and the Sub-Roman periods, the county was the home of the Dumnonii Celtic Britons. The Anglo-Saxon settlement of Britain resulted in the partial assimilation of Dumnonia into the kingdom of Wessex in the eighth and ninth centuries, and the western boundary with Cornwall was set at the Tamar by king Æthelstan in 936.

== Toponymy ==
The name Devon derives from the Dumnonii, which is the name of the Brythons who inhabited the southwestern peninsula of Britain at the time of the Roman conquest of Britain. Dumnonii is thought to mean 'deep valley dwellers' from Proto-Celtic *dubnos 'deep'. In the Brittonic languages, Devon is known as Welsh: Dyfnaint, Breton: Devnent and Cornish: Dewnens, each meaning 'deep valleys'. (For an account of Celtic Dumnonia, see the separate article.) Among the most common Devon placenames is -combe, which derives from Brittonic cwm meaning 'valley' usually prefixed by the name of the possessor.

William Camden, in his 1607 edition of Britannia, described Devon as being one part of an older, wider country that once included Cornwall:

THAT region which, according to the Geographers, is the first of all Britaine, and, growing straiter still and narrower, shooteth out farthest into the West, [...] was in antient time inhabited by those Britans whom Solinus called Dumnonii, Ptolomee Damnonii [...] For their habitation all over this Countrey is somewhat low and in valleys, which manner of dwelling is called in the British tongue Dan-munith, in which sense also the Province next adjoyning in like respect is at this day named by the Britans Duffneit, that is to say, Low valleys. [...] But the Country of this nation is at this day divided into two parts, knowen by later names of Cornwall and Denshire, [...]

— William Camden, Britannia.

The term Devon is normally used for everyday purposes (e.g., "Devon County Council"), but Devonshire has continued to be used in the names of the "Devonshire and Dorset Regiment" (until 2007) and "The Devonshire Association". One erroneous theory is that the shire suffix is due to a mistake in the making of the original letters patent for the Duke of Devonshire, resident in Derbyshire. There are references to both Defnas and Defenasċīre in Anglo-Saxon texts from before 1000 CE (the former is a name for the "people of Devon" and the latter would mean 'Shire of the Devonians'), which translates to modern English as Devonshire. The term Devonshire may have originated around the 8th century, when it changed from Dumnonia (Latin) to Defenasċīr.

== History ==
=== Human occupation ===
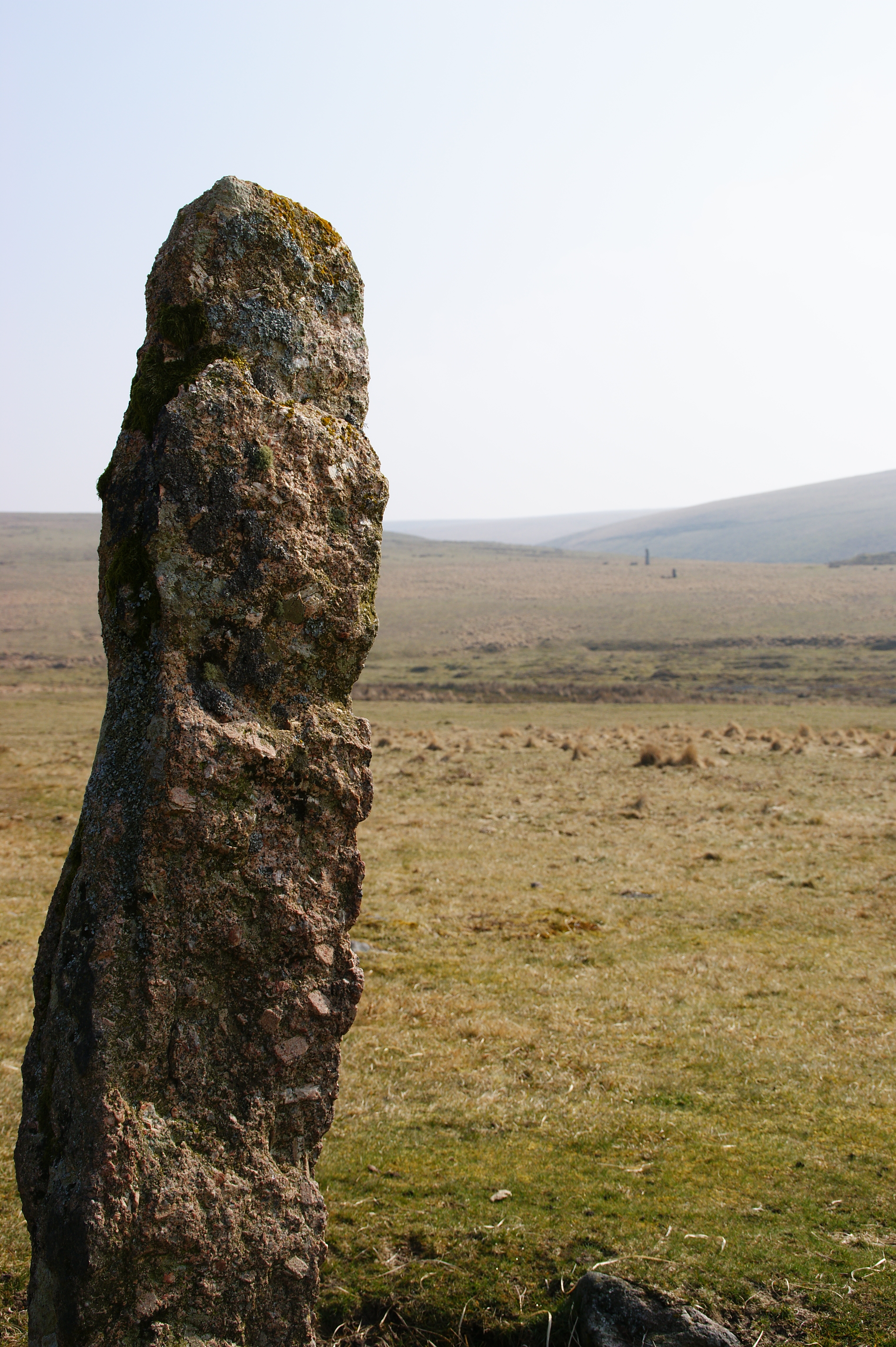
Menhir at Drizzlecombe

Kents Cavern in Torquay had produced human remains from 30 to 40,000 years ago. Dartmoor is thought to have been occupied by Mesolithic hunter-gatherer peoples from about 6000 BC. The Romans held the area under military occupation for around 350 years. Later, the area began to experience Saxon incursions from the east around 600 AD, firstly as small bands of settlers along the coasts of Lyme Bay and southern estuaries and later as more organised bands pushing in from the east. Devon became a frontier between Brittonic and Anglo-Saxon Wessex, and it was largely absorbed into Wessex by the mid ninth century.

A genetic study carried out by the University of Oxford and University College London discovered separate genetic groups in Cornwall and Devon. Not only were there differences on either side of the River Tamar—with a division almost exactly following the modern county boundary, but also between Devon and the rest of Southern England. Devon's population also exhibited similarities with modern northern France, including Brittany. This suggests the Anglo-Saxon migration into Devon was limited, rather than a mass movement of people.

The border with Cornwall was set by King Æthelstan on the east bank of the River Tamar in 936 AD. Danish raids also occurred sporadically along many coastal parts of Devon between around 800AD and just before the time of the Norman conquest, including the silver mint at Hlidaforda Lydford in 997 and Taintona (a settlement on the Teign estuary) in 1001.

Devon was the home of a number of anticlerical movements in the Later Middle Ages. For example, the Order of Brothelyngham—a fake monastic order of 1348—regularly rode through Exeter, kidnapping both religious men and laymen, and extorting money from them as ransom.

Devon has also featured in most of the civil conflicts in England since the Norman Conquest, including the Wars of the Roses, Perkin Warbeck's rising in 1497, the Prayer Book Rebellion of 1549, and the English Civil War. The arrival of William of Orange to launch the Glorious Revolution of 1688 took place at Brixham.

Devon has produced tin, copper and other metals from ancient times. Devon's tin miners enjoyed a substantial degree of independence through Devon's Stannary Convocation, which dates back to the 12th century. The last recorded sitting was in 1748.

== Geography ==
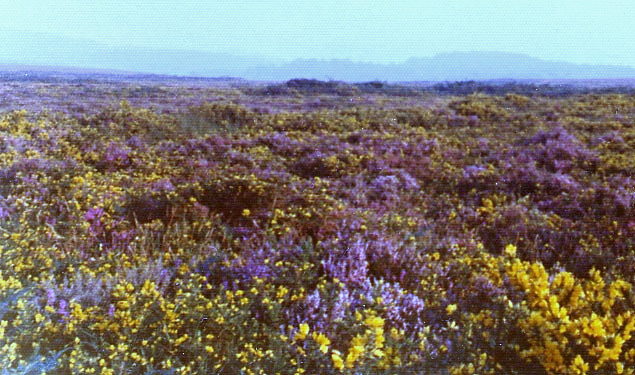
Heathland at Woodbury Common in south east Devon

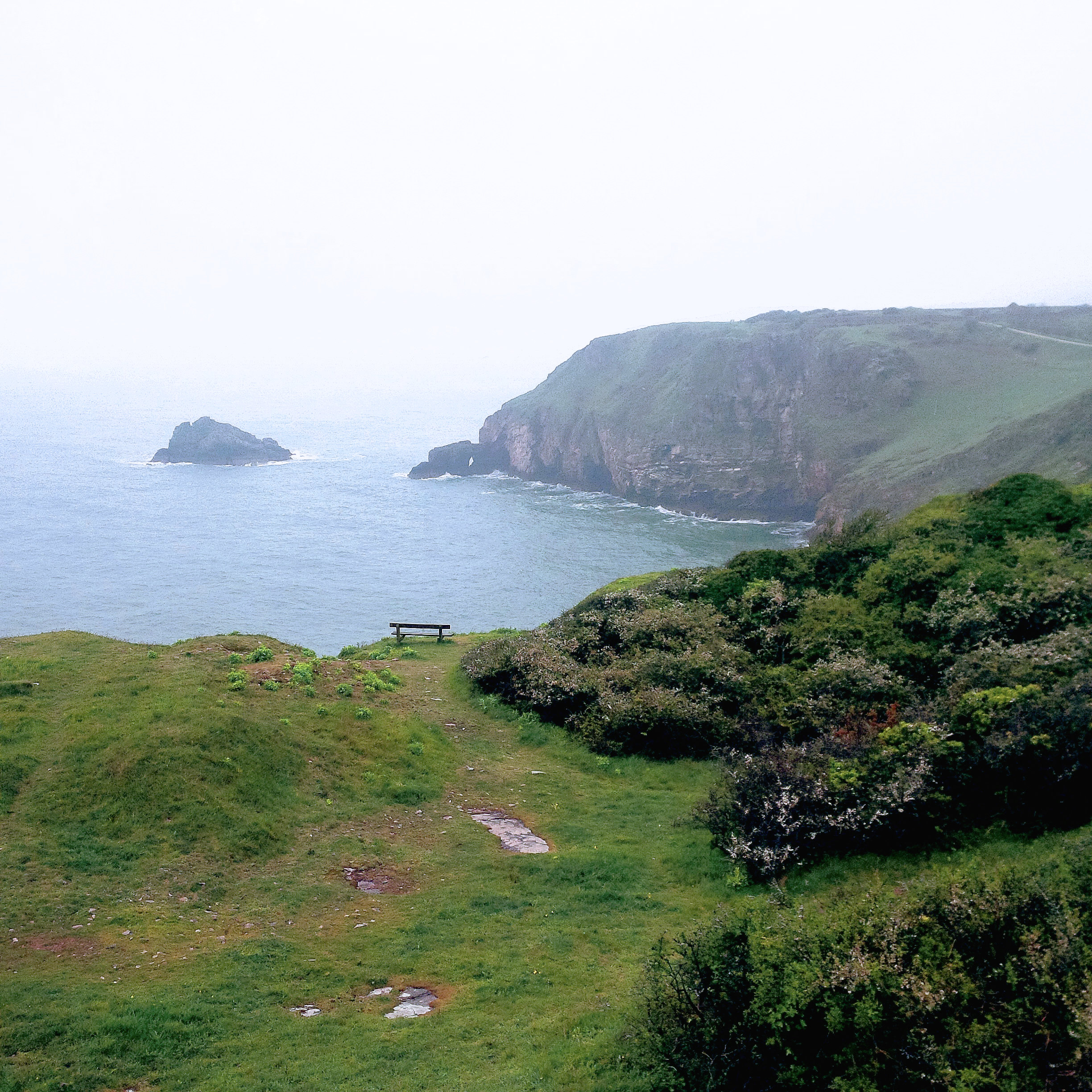
Cliffs in Devon

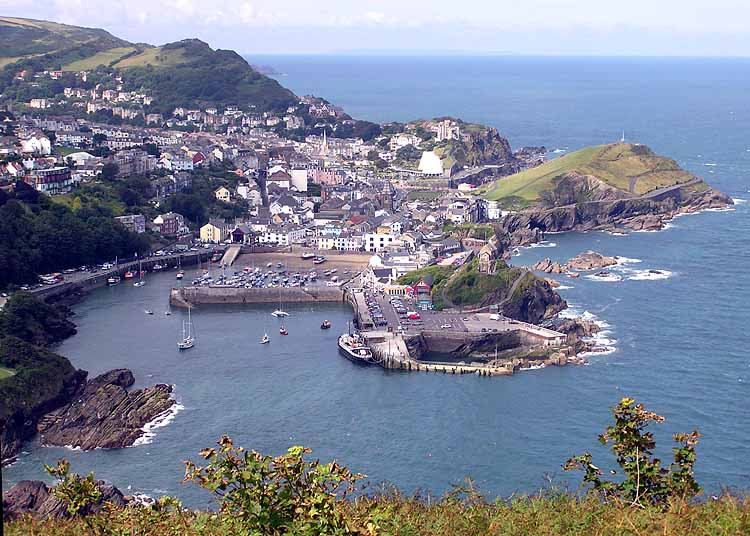
Ilfracombe, on the coast of North Devon

Devon straddles a peninsula and so, uniquely among English counties, has two separate coastlines: on the Bristol Channel and Celtic Sea in the north, and on the English Channel in the south. The South West Coast Path runs along the entire length of both, around 65% of which is named as Heritage Coast. Devon is the third largest county by area and the largest of the counties not divided into county-like divisions (only Yorkshire and Lincolnshire were larger and both were sub-divided into ridings or parts, respectively). It is likewise the third largest administrative county. Ceremonially it has ranked fourth by area since 1974 due to the creation of Cumbria, a situation which was mirrored administratively from 1974 till 2023. The island of Lundy and the reef of Eddystone are also in Devon. The county has more mileage of road than any other county in England.

Inland, the Dartmoor National Park lies wholly in Devon, and the Exmoor National Park lies in both Devon and Somerset. Apart from these areas of high moorland the county has attractive rolling rural scenery and villages with thatched cob cottages. All these features make Devon a popular holiday destination.

In South Devon, the landscape consists of rolling hills dotted with small towns, such as Dartmouth, Ivybridge, Kingsbridge, Salcombe, and Totnes. The towns of Torquay and Paignton are the principal seaside resorts on the south coast. East Devon has the first seaside resort to be developed in the county, Exmouth and the more upmarket Georgian town of Sidmouth, headquarters of the East Devon District Council. Exmouth marks the western end of the Jurassic Coast World Heritage Site. Another notable feature is the coastal railway line between Newton Abbot and the Exe Estuary: the red sandstone cliffs and sea views are very dramatic and in the resorts railway line and beaches are very near.

North Devon is very rural with few major towns except Barnstaple, Great Torrington, Bideford and Ilfracombe. Devon's Exmoor coast has the highest cliffs in southern Britain, culminating in the Great Hangman, a 318 m (1,043 ft) "hog's-back" hill with a 250 m (820 ft) cliff-face, located near Combe Martin Bay. Its sister cliff is the 218 m (715 ft) Little Hangman, which marks the western edge of coastal Exmoor. One of the features of the North Devon coast is that Bideford Bay and the Hartland Point peninsula are both west-facing, Atlantic facing coastlines; so that a combination of an off-shore (east) wind and an Atlantic swell produce excellent surfing conditions. The beaches of Bideford Bay (Woolacombe, Saunton, Westward Ho! and Croyde), along with parts of North Cornwall and South Wales, are the main centres of surfing in Britain.

=== Geology ===
Geological map of Wales & Southwest England

A geological dividing line cuts across Devon roughly along the line of the Bristol to Exeter line and the M5 motorway east of Tiverton and Exeter. It is a part of the Tees–Exe line broadly dividing Britain into a southeastern lowland zone typified by gently dipping sedimentary rocks and a northwestern upland zone typified by igneous rocks and folded sedimentary and metamorphic rocks.

The principal geological components of Devon are i) the Devonian strata of north Devon and south west Devon (and extending into Cornwall); ii) the Culm Measures (north western Devon also extending into north Cornwall); and iii) the granite intrusion of Dartmoor in central Devon, part of the Cornubian batholith forming the 'spine' of the southwestern peninsula. There are blocks of Silurian and Ordovician rocks within Devonian strata on the south Devon coast but otherwise no pre-Devonian rocks on the Devon mainland. The metamorphic rocks of Eddystone are of presumed Precambrian age.

The oldest rocks that can be dated are those of the Devonian period, which are approximately 395–359 million years old. Sandstones and shales were deposited in North and South Devon beneath tropical seas. In shallower waters, limestone beds were laid down in the area now near Torquay and Plymouth. This geological period was named after Devon by Roderick Murchison and Adam Sedgwick in the 1840s and is the only British county whose name is used worldwide as the basis for a geological time period.

Devon's second major rock system is the Culm Measures, a geological formation of the Carboniferous period that occurs principally in Devon and Cornwall. The measures are so called either from the occasional presence of a soft, sooty coal, which is known in Devon as culm, or from the contortions commonly found in the beds. This formation stretches from Bideford to Bude in Cornwall, and contributes to a gentler, greener, more rounded landscape. It is also found on the western, north and eastern borders of Dartmoor.

The sedimentary rocks in more eastern parts of the county include Permian and Triassic sandstones (giving rise to east Devon's well known fertile red soils); Bunter pebble beds around Budleigh Salterton and Woodbury Common and Jurassic rocks in the easternmost parts of Devon. Smaller outcrops of younger rocks also exist, such as Cretaceous chalk cliffs at Beer Head and gravels on Haldon, plus Eocene and Oligocene ball clay and lignite deposits in the Bovey Basin, formed around 50 million years ago under tropical forest conditions.

=== Climate ===
Devon generally has a cool oceanic climate, heavily influenced by the North Atlantic Drift. In winter, snow is relatively uncommon away from high land, although there are a few exceptions. The county has mild summers with occasional warm spells and cool rainy periods. Winters are generally cool and the county often experiences some of the mildest winters in the world for its high latitude, with average daily maximum temperatures in January at 8 °C (46 °F). Rainfall varies significantly across the county, ranging from over 2,000 mm (79 in) on parts of Dartmoor, to around 750 mm (30 in) in the rain shadow along the coast in southeastern Devon and around Exeter. Sunshine amounts also vary widely: the moors are generally cloudy, with the uplands near Princetown receiving less than 1,400 hours of sunshine annually, but the SE coast around Brixham and Berry Head receives more than 1,800 hours annually and is one of the sunniest areas of the UK. With westerly or south-westerly winds and high pressure the area around Torbay and Teignmouth will often be warm, with long sunny spells due to shelter by high ground (Foehn wind).

Climate data for Devon
Month	Jan	Feb	Mar	Apr	May	Jun	Jul	Aug	Sep	Oct	Nov	Dec	Year
Mean daily maximum °C (°F)	8 (46)	8 (46)	10 (50)	13 (55)	16 (61)	19 (66)	21 (70)	21 (70)	19 (66)	15 (59)	12 (54)	9 (48)	13.5 (56.3)
Mean daily minimum °C (°F)	4 (39)	3 (37)	5 (41)	6 (43)	8 (46)	11 (52)	13 (55)	13 (55)	12 (54)	9 (48)	7 (45)	5 (41)	8 (46)

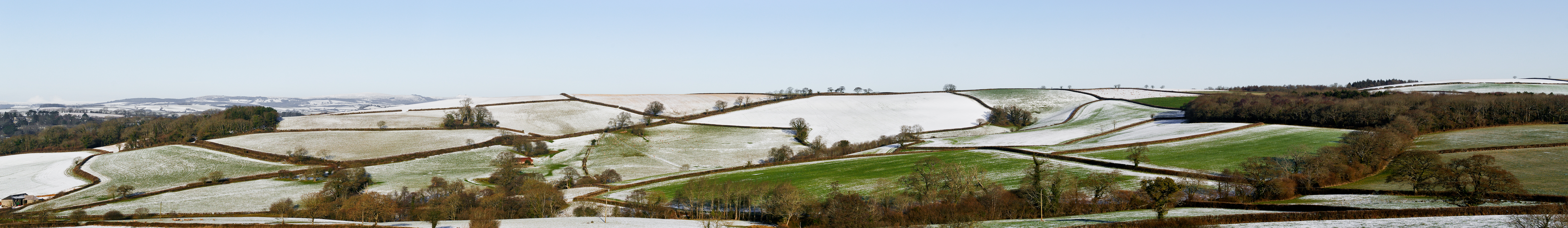
Fields in south Devon after a snowfall

=== Ecology ===
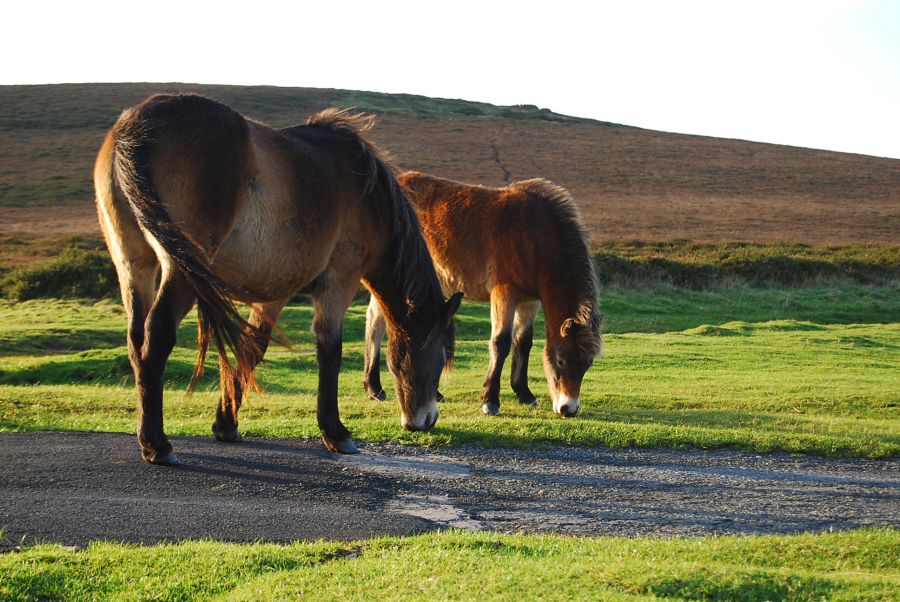
Ponies grazing on Exmoor near Brendon, North Devon

The variety of habitats means that there is a wide range of wildlife (see Dartmoor wildlife, for example). A popular challenge among birders is to find over 100 species in the county in a day. The county's wildlife is protected by several wildlife charities such as the Devon Wildlife Trust, which looks after 40 nature reserves. The Devon Bird Watching and Preservation Society (founded in 1928 and known since 2005 as "Devon Birds") is a county bird society dedicated to the study and conservation of wild birds. The RSPB has reserves in the county, and Natural England is responsible for over 200 Devon Sites of Special Scientific Interest and National Nature Reserves, such as Slapton Ley. The Devon Bat Group was founded in 1984 to help conserve bats. Wildlife found in this area extend to a plethora of different kinds of insects, butterflies and moths; an interesting butterfly to take look at is the chequered skipper.

Devon is a national hotspot for several species that are uncommon in Britain, including the cirl bunting; greater horseshoe bat; Bechstein's bat and Jersey tiger moth. It is also the only place in mainland Britain where the sand crocus (Romulea columnae) can be found – at Dawlish Warren, and is home to all six British native land reptile species, partly as a result of some reintroductions. Another recent reintroduction is the Eurasian beaver, primarily on the river Otter. Other rare species recorded in Devon include seahorses and the sea daffodil.

The botany of the county is very diverse and includes some rare species not found elsewhere in the British Isles other than Cornwall. Devon is divided into two Watsonian vice-counties: north and south, the boundary being an irregular line approximately across the higher part of Dartmoor and then along the canal eastwards. Botanical reports begin in the 17th century and there is a Flora Devoniensis by Jones and Kingston in 1829. A general account appeared in The Victoria History of the County of Devon (1906), and a Flora of Devon was published in 1939 by Keble Martin and Fraser. An Atlas of the Devon Flora by Ivimey-Cook appeared in 1984, and A New Flora of Devon, based on field work undertaken between 2005 and 2014, was published in 2016. Rising temperatures have led to Devon becoming the first place in modern Britain to cultivate olives commercially.

In January 2024, plans were announced to plant over 100,000 trees in northern Devon to support Celtic rainforests, which are cherished yet at risk ecosystems in the UK. The project aims to create 50 hectares of new rainforest across three sites, planting trees near existing rainforest areas along the coast and inland. Among the tree species to be planted is the rare Devon whitebeam, known for its unique reproduction method and once-popular fruit. Led by the National Trust and with the assistance of volunteers and community groups, the initiative will focus on locations in Exmoor, Woolacombe, Hartland, and Arlington Court.

== Demographics ==
In the 2021 census, the ceremonial county of Devon had a usual resident population of 1,215,661. The ceremonial county of Devon is divided between one non-metropolitan county: Devon County Council, which, in the 2021 census, had a usual resident population of 811,642, and two unitary authorities: Plymouth City Council, which, in the 2021 census, had a usual resident population of 264,695, and Torbay Council, which, in the 2021 census, had a usual resident population of 139,324.

=== Ethnicity ===
For the overwhelming majority of Devon's history, the population of the ceremonial county was ethnically homogeneous, with the population being of White British ethnicity. In the 2021 census, the ethnic composition of the ceremonial county of Devon comprised: 95.8% White; 1.6% Asian; 0.5% Black; 1.5% Mixed; and 0.6% Other.

- White (95.8%): English, Welsh, Scottish, Northern Irish or British (91.8%); Irish (0.5%); Gypsy or Irish Traveller (0.1%); Roma (0.1%); and Other White (3.4%).
- Asian (1.6%): Indian (0.4%); Pakistani (0.1%); Bangladeshi (0.1%); Chinese (0.4%); and Other Asian (0.6%).
- Black (0.5%): African (0.3%); Caribbean (0.1%); and Other Black (0.1%).
- Mixed (1.5%): White and Asian (0.5%); White and Black African (0.2%); White and Black Caribbean (0.3%); and Other Mixed or Multiple ethnic groups (0.4%).
- Other (0.6%): Arab (0.2%) and Any other ethnic group (0.4%).

Note: Sub-group totals may not sum exactly to the group total due to rounding. Data for the ceremonial county are aggregated from its constituent unitary authorities.

Ethnic groups in Devon (ceremonial county)
Ethnic Group	2001 Census	2011 Census	2021 Census				
Ethnic Group	2001 Census	2011 Census	2021 Census	White	98.7%	97.3%	95.8%
Asian	0.5%	1.2%	1.6%				
Black	0.1%	0.3%	0.5%				
Mixed	0.5%	1%	1.5%				
Other	0.1%	0.3%	0.6%				

Note: The 2001 census figures for 'Asian' and 'Other' have been adjusted to reflect the 2011 reclassification of the Chinese ethnic group from 'Other' to 'Asian' to allow comparison across census years.

=== Religion ===
Religion in Devon (ceremonial county) (2021 United Kingdom census)
1. Christianity (46.1%)
2. No religion (45.3%)
3. Islam (0.70%)
4. Buddhism (0.40%)
5. Hinduism (0.20%)
6. Judaism (0.10%)
7. Sikhism (0.00%)
8. Other religion (0.60%)
9. Not stated (6.40%)

In the 2021 census, the religious composition of the ceremonial county of Devon comprised: 46.1% Christian; 45.3% No religion; 0.7% Muslim; 0.4% Buddhist; 0.2% Hindu; 0.1% Jewish; 0.0% Sikh; 0.6% Other religion; and 6.4% Not stated.

Religion in Devon (ceremonial county)
Religion	2001 Census	2011 Census	2021 Census				
Religion	2001 Census	2011 Census	2021 Census	Christianity	74.7%	61.0%	46.1%
No religion	16.5%	29.4%	45.3%				
Islam	0.3%	0.5%	0.7%				
Buddhism	0.2%	0.4%	0.4%				
Hinduism	0.1%	0.1%	0.2%				
Judaism	0.1%	0.1%	0.1%				
Sikhism	0.0%	0.0%	0.0%				
Other religion	0.4%	0.5%	0.6%				
Not stated	7.7%	8.0%	6.4%				

==== Ancient and medieval history ====
The region of Devon was the dominion of the pre-Roman Dumnonii Celtic tribe, known as the "Deep Valley Dwellers". The region to the west of Exeter was less Romanised than the rest of Roman Britain since it was considered a remote part of the province. After the formal Roman withdrawal from Britain in AD 410, one of the leading Dumnonii families attempted to create a dynasty and rule over Devon as the new Kings of Dumnonii.

Celtic paganism and Roman practices were the first known religions in Devon, although in the mid-fourth century AD, Christianity was introduced to Devon. In the Sub-Roman period the church in the British Isles was characterised by some differences in practice from the Latin Christianity of the continent of Europe and is known as Celtic Christianity; however it was always in communion with the wider Roman Catholic Church. Many Cornish saints are commemorated also in Devon in legends, churches and place-names. Western Christianity came to Devon when it was over a long period incorporated into the Kingdom of Wessex and the jurisdiction of the bishop of Wessex. Saint Petroc is said to have passed through Devon, where ancient dedications to him are even more numerous than in Cornwall: a probable seventeen (plus Timberscombe just over the border in Somerset), compared to Cornwall's five. The position of churches bearing his name, including one within the old Roman walls of Exeter, are nearly always near the coast, as in those days travelling was done mainly by sea. The Devonian villages of Petrockstowe and Newton St Petroc are also named after Saint Petroc and the flag of Devon is dedicated to him.

The history of Christianity in the South West of England remains to some degree obscure. Parts of the historic county of Devon formed part of the diocese of Wessex, while nothing is known of the church organisation of the Celtic areas. About 703 Devon and Cornwall were included in the separate diocese of Sherborne and in 900 this was again divided into two, the Devon bishop having from 905 his seat at Tawton (now Bishop's Tawton) and from 912 at Crediton, birthplace of St Boniface. Lyfing became Bishop of Crediton in 1027 and shortly afterwards became Bishop of Cornwall.

The two dioceses of Crediton and Cornwall, covering Devon and Cornwall, were united under Edward the Confessor by Lyfing's successor Bishop Leofric, hitherto Bishop of Crediton, who became first Bishop of Exeter under Edward the Confessor, which was established as his cathedral city in 1050. At first, the abbey church of St Mary and St Peter, founded by Athelstan in 932 and rebuilt in 1019, served as the cathedral.

Devon came under the political influence of several different nobles during the Middle Ages, especially the Courtenays Earl of Devon. During the Wars of the Roses, important magnates included the Earl of Devon, William Bonville, 1st Baron Bonville, and Humphrey Stafford, 1st Earl of Devon whose wider influence stretched from Cornwall to Wiltshire. After 1485, one of the county's influential figures included Henry VII's courtier Robert Willoughby, 1st Baron Willoughby de Broke.

==== Later history ====
In 1549, the Prayer Book Rebellion caused the deaths of thousands of people from Devon and Cornwall. During the English Reformation, churches in Devon officially became affiliated with the Church of England. From the late sixteenth century onwards, zealous Protestantism – or 'puritanism' – became increasingly well-entrenched in some parts of Devon, while other districts of the county remained much more conservative. These divisions would become starkly apparent during the English Civil War of 1642–46, when the county split apart along religious and cultural lines. The Methodism of John Wesley proved to be very popular with the working classes in Devon in the 19th century. Methodist chapels became important social centres, with male voice choirs and other church-affiliated groups playing a central role in the social lives of working class Devonians. Methodism still plays a large part in the religious life of Devon today, although the county has shared in the post-World War II decline in British religious feeling.

The Diocese of Exeter remains the Anglican diocese including the whole of Devon. The Roman Catholic Diocese of Plymouth was established in the mid 19th century.

== Governance ==
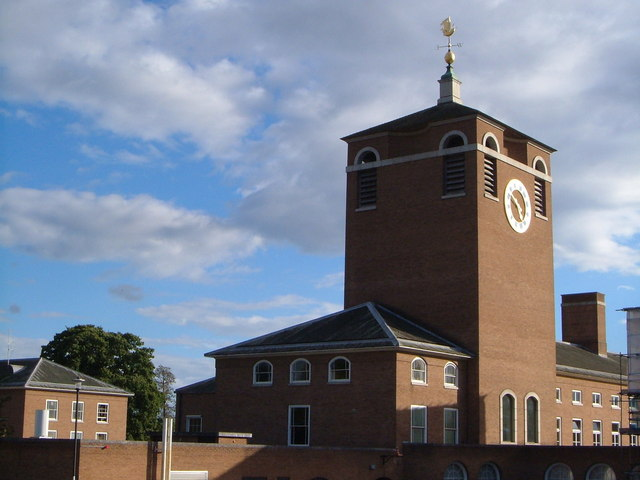
County Hall, Exeter. Headquarters for Devon County Council.

The administrative centre and capital of Devon is the city of Exeter. The largest city in Devon, Plymouth, and the conurbation of Torbay (which includes the largest town in Devon and capital of Torbay, Torquay, as well as Paignton and Brixham) have been unitary authorities since 1998, separate from the remainder of Devon which is administered by Devon County Council for the purposes of local government.

Devon County Council is under no overall control, and the political representation of its 60 councillors are: 27 Liberal Democrats, 16 Reform UK, 7 Conservatives, 6 Greens, and 4 Independents.

At the 2024 general election, Devon returned six Liberal Democrats, four Conservatives and three Labour MPs to the House of Commons.

=== Hundreds ===
Historically Devon was divided into 32 hundreds: Axminster, Bampton, Black Torrington, Braunton, Cliston, Coleridge, Colyton, Crediton, East Budleigh, Ermington, Exminster, Fremington, Halberton, Hartland, Hayridge, Haytor, Hemyock, Lifton, North Tawton and Winkleigh, Ottery, Plympton, Roborough, Shebbear, Shirwell, South Molton, Stanborough, Tavistock, Teignbridge, Tiverton, West Budleigh, Witheridge, and Wonford.

=== Combined County Authority ===
Devon County Council and Torbay Council are constituent members of the Devon and Torbay Combined County Authority, which has devolved powers over transport, housing, skills, and support for business.

The authority consists of 12 members: six constituent members with full voting rights, four non-constituent members who do not have voting powers unless extended to them by the constituent members, and two associate members who cannot vote. Devon County Council and Torbay Council each choose half of the constituent members. Two of the non-constituent members are selected collectively by the district councils of Devon to represent their interests, and one is reserved for the Devon and Cornwall Police and Crime Commissioner. The remaining non-constituent member and the two associate members are elected by the constituent members of the authority.

=== Future ===
In July 2026, the Government of the United Kingdom announced its intention to reorganise Devon into four unitary authority areas by April 2028. Exeter, Plymouth, and Torbay will cover their namesake settlements and the surrounding area; each is larger than the current district covering the settlement. Devon Coast and Countryside will cover the remainder of the county. Elections to the new unitary authorities will be held in May 2027.

== Settlements ==
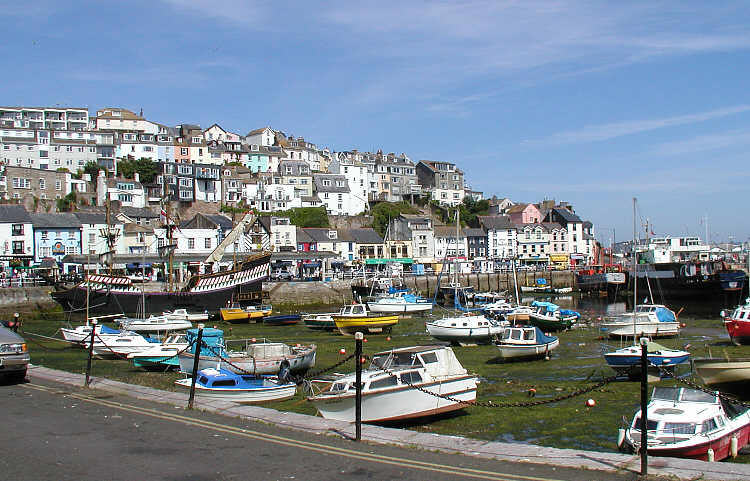
The inner harbour, Brixham, south Devon, at low tide

The main settlements in Devon are the cities of Plymouth, a historic port now administratively independent, Exeter, the county town, and Torbay, the county's tourist centre. Devon's coast is lined with tourist resorts, many of which grew rapidly with the arrival of the railways in the 19th century. Examples include Dawlish, Exmouth and Sidmouth on the south coast, and Ilfracombe and Lynmouth on the north. The Torbay conurbation of Torquay, Paignton and Brixham on the south coast is now administratively independent of the county. Rural market towns in the county include Barnstaple, Bideford, Honiton, Newton Abbot, Okehampton, Tavistock, Totnes and Tiverton.

The boundary with Cornwall has not always been on the River Tamar as at present: until the late 19th century a few parishes in the Torpoint area were in Devon and five parishes now in north-east Cornwall were in Devon until 1974 (however, for ecclesiastical purposes these were nevertheless in the Archdeaconry of Cornwall and in 1876 became part of the Diocese of Truro).

== Symbols ==
=== Coat of arms ===
The coat of arms of Devon County Council

There was no established coat of arms for the county until 1926: the arms of the City of Exeter were often used to represent Devon, for instance in the badge of the Devonshire Regiment. During the forming of a county council by the Local Government Act 1888 adoption of a common seal was required. The seal contained three shields depicting the arms of Exeter along with those of the first chairman and vice-chairman of the council (Lord Clinton and the Earl of Morley).

On 11 October 1926, the county council received a grant of arms from the College of Arms. The main part of the shield displays a red crowned lion on a silver field, the arms of Richard Plantagenet, Earl of Cornwall. The chief or upper portion of the shield depicts an ancient ship on wavers, for Devon's seafaring traditions. The Latin motto adopted was Auxilio Divino (by Divine aid), that of Sir Francis Drake. The 1926 grant was of arms alone. On 6 March 1962 a further grant of crest and supporters was obtained. The crest is the head of a Dartmoor Pony rising from a "Naval Crown". This distinctive form of crown is formed from the sails and sterns of ships, and is associated with the Royal Navy. The supporters are a Devon bull and a sea lion.

Devon County Council adopted a "ship silhouette" logo after the 1974 reorganisation, adapted from the ship emblem on the coat of arms, but following the loss in 1998 of Plymouth and Torbay re-adopted the coat of arms. In April 2006 the council unveiled a new logo which was to be used in most everyday applications, though the coat of arms will continue to be used for "various civic purposes".

=== Flag ===
The flag of the historic county of Devon

Devon also has its own flag which has been dedicated to Saint Petroc, a local saint with dedications throughout Devon and neighbouring counties. The flag was adopted in 2003 after a competition run by BBC Radio Devon. The winning design was created by website contributor Ryan Sealey, and won 49% of the votes cast. The colours of the flag are those popularly identified with Devon, for example, the colours of the University of Exeter, the rugby union team, and the Green and White flag flown by the first Viscount Exmouth at the Bombardment of Algiers (now on view at the Teign Valley Museum), as well as one of the county's football teams, Plymouth Argyle. On 17 October 2006, the flag was hoisted for the first time outside County Hall in Exeter to mark Local Democracy Week, receiving official recognition from the county council. In 2019 Devon County Council with the support of both the Anglican and Catholic churches in Exeter and Plymouth, officially recognised Saint Boniface as the Patron Saint of Devon.

== Place names and customs ==
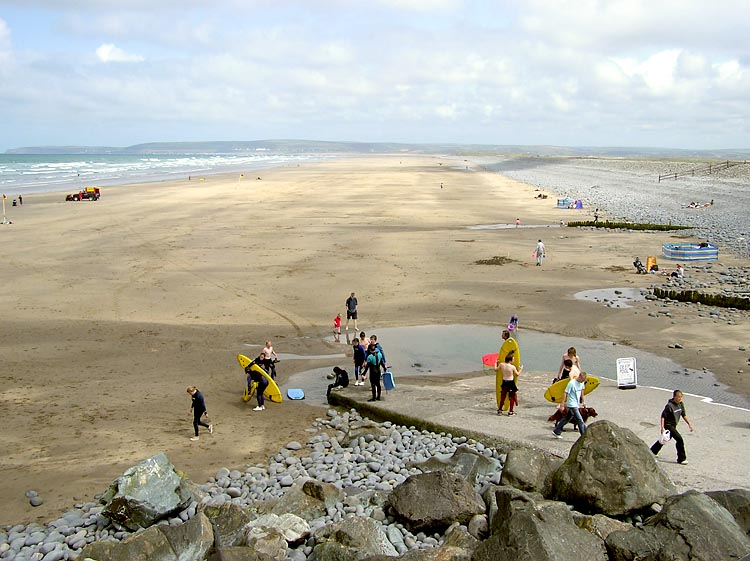
The beach at Westward Ho!, North Devon, looking north towards the shared estuary of the rivers Taw and Torridge

Devon's toponyms include many with the endings "coombe/combe" and "tor". Both 'coombe' (valley or hollow, cf. Welsh cwm, Cornish komm) and 'tor' (Old Welsh twrr and Scots Gaelic tòrr from Latin turris; 'tower' used for granite formations) are rare Celtic loanwords in English and their frequency is greatest in Devon which shares a boundary with historically Brittonic speaking Cornwall. Ruined medieval settlements of Dartmoor longhouses indicate that dispersed rural settlement (OE tun, now often -ton) was very similar to that found in Cornish 'tre-' settlements, however these are generally described with the local placename -(a)cott, from the Old English for homestead, cf. cottage. Saxon endings in -worthy (from Anglo-Saxon worthig) indicate larger settlements. Several 'Bere's indicate Anglo-Saxon wood groves, as 'leighs' indicate clearings.

Devon has a variety of festivals and traditional practices, including the traditional orchard-visiting Wassail in Whimple every 17 January, and the carrying of flaming tar barrels in Ottery St. Mary, where people who have lived in Ottery for long enough are called upon to celebrate Bonfire Night by running through the village (and the gathered crowds) with flaming barrels on their backs. Berry Pomeroy still celebrates Queene's Day for Elizabeth I.

== Economy ==
Devon's total economic output in 2019 was over £26 billion, larger than either Manchester, or Edinburgh. A 2021 report states that "health, retail and tourism account for 43.1% of employment. Agriculture, education, manufacturing, construction and real estate employment are also over-represented in Devon compared with nationally".

Like neighbouring Cornwall to the west, historically Devon has been disadvantaged economically compared to other parts of Southern England, owing to the decline of a number of core industries, notably fishing, mining, and farming, but it is now more diverse. Agriculture has been an important industry in Devon since the 19th century. The 2001 UK foot and mouth crisis harmed the farming community severely. Since then some parts of the agricultural industry have begun to diversify and recover, with a strong local food sector and many artisan producers. Nonetheless, in 2015 the dairy industry was still suffering from the low prices offered for wholesale milk by major dairies, particularly by large supermarket chains.

The pandemic negatively affected the economy during 2020 and early 2021; an August 2021 report states that "the immediate economic impacts of COVID-19 for the County as a whole [was] as severe as any in living memory".

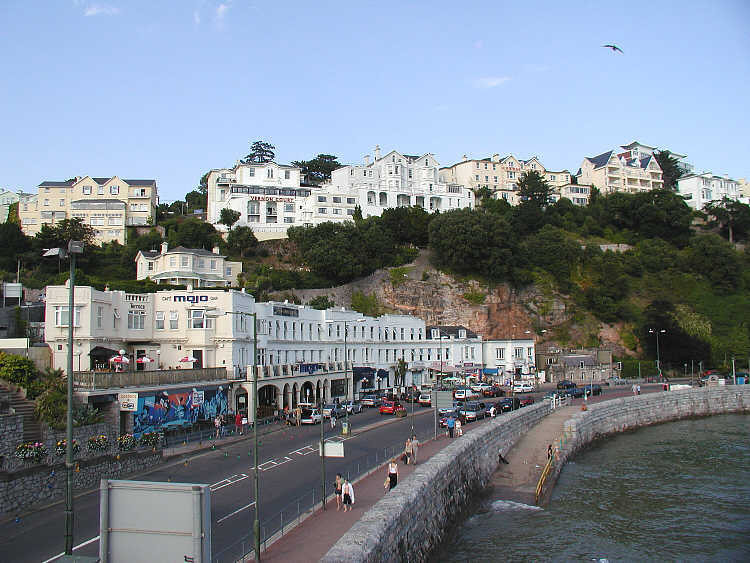
Part of the seafront of Torquay, south Devon, at high tide

Between 2014 and 2016, the attractive lifestyle of the area was drawing in new industries which were not heavily dependent upon geographical location; Dartmoor, for instance, saw a significant rise in the percentage of its inhabitants involved in the digital and financial services sectors. The Met Office, the UK's national and international weather service, moved to Exeter in 2003. Plymouth hosts the head office and first ever store of The Range, the only major national retail chain headquartered in Devon.

Since the rise of seaside resorts with the arrival of the railways in the 19th century, Devon's economy has been heavily reliant on tourism. The county's economy followed the declining trend of British seaside resorts since the mid-20th century, but with some recent revival and regeneration of its resorts, particularly focused around camping; sports such as surfing, cycling, sailing and heritage. This revival has been aided by the designation of much of Devon's countryside and coastline as the Dartmoor and Exmoor national parks, and the Jurassic Coast and Cornwall and West Devon Mining Landscape World Heritage Sites. In 2019 the county's visitor spend was almost £2.5 billion. More successful visitor attractions are particularly concentrated on food and drink, including sea-view restaurants in North-West Devon (such as one example belonging to Damien Hurst), walking the South West Coast Path, cycling on the Devon Coast to Coast Cycle Route and other cycle routes such as the Tarka Trail and the Stover Trail; watersports; surfing; indoor and outdoor folk music festivals across the county and sailing in the 5-mile (8.0 km) hill-surrounded inlet (ria) at Salcombe.

Incomes vary significantly and the average is bolstered by a high proportion of affluent retired people. Incomes in much of the South Hams and in villages surrounding Exeter and Plymouth are close to, or above the national average, but there are also areas of severe deprivation, with earnings in some places among the lowest in the UK.

The table also shows the population change in the ten years to the 2011 census by subdivision. It also shows the proportion of residents in each district reliant upon lowest income and/or joblessness benefits, the national average proportion of which was 4.5% as at August 2012, the year for which latest datasets have been published. It can be seen that the most populous district of Devon is East Devon but only if excluding Torbay which has marginally more residents and Plymouth which has approximately double the number of residents of either of these. West Devon has the fewest residents, having 63,839 at the time of the census.

Population from census to census. Claimants of Jobseeker's Allowance (JSA) or Income Support (DWP)
Unit	JSA or Inc. Supp. claimants (August 2012) % of 2011 population	JSA and Income Support claimants (August 2001) % of 2001 population	Population (April 2011)	Population (April 2001)
Devon	2.7%	6.6%	746,399	704,493
Ranked by district
Exeter	3.5%	7.5%	117,773	111,076
Torridge	3.3%	7.7%	63,839	58,965
North Devon	2.8%	7.8%	93,667	87,508
Teignbridge	2.6%	6.7%	124,220	120,958
Mid Devon	2.6%	6.0%	77,750	69,774
West Devon	2.5%	5.9%	53,553	48,843
South Hams	2.1%	6.0%	83,140	81,849
East Devon	1.9%	5.4%	132,457	125,520
In historic Devon
Torbay	5.3%	11.0%	130,959	129,706
Plymouth	5.1%	9.5%	256,384	240,720

== Transport ==
=== Bus ===
There is a network of buses across Devon, the largest operator in Devon is Stagecoach South West, having operated 93% of services in the county in 2021. Smaller operators include Dartline, Country Bus and Plymouth Citybus.

Devon County Council oversees and co-ordinates bus transport through DevonBus, an Enhanced Partnership covering the county, with the purpose of improving the network and creating a unified brand for buses in the county.

=== Rail ===
The key train operator for Devon is Great Western Railway, which operates numerous regional, local and suburban services, as well as inter-city services north to London Paddington and south to Plymouth and Penzance. Other inter-city services are operated by CrossCountry north to Manchester Piccadilly, Edinburgh Waverley, Glasgow Central, Dundee, Aberdeen and south to Plymouth and Penzance; and by South Western Railway, operating hourly services between London Waterloo and Exeter St Davids, via the West of England Main Line. All Devon services are diesel-hauled, since there are no electrified lines in the county.

Okehampton station in Devon was closed in 1972 to passenger traffic as a result of the Beeching cuts, but regained regular passenger services run by GWR to Exeter in November 2021, funded by the UK Government's Restoring your Railway programme.

There are proposals to reopen the line from Tavistock to Bere Alston for a through service to Plymouth. The possibility of reopening the line between Tavistock and Okehampton, to provide an alternative route between Exeter and Plymouth, has also been suggested following damage to the railway's sea wall at Dawlish in 2014, which caused widespread disruption to trains between Exeter and Penzance. However, a study by Network Rail determined that maintaining the existing railway line would offer the best value for money and work to strengthen the line at Dawlish began in 2019.

==== Devon Metro ====
Devon County Council has proposed a 'Devon Metro' scheme to improve rail services in the county and offer a realistic alternative to car travel. This includes the opening of Cranbrook station in December 2015, plus four new stations to be constructed (including Edginswell) as a priority. Several elements of the scheme have, or are in the process of being delivered including the building of Marsh Barton station on the edge of Exeter which was opened in July 2023, and a regular half hourly local rail service now extended from the Avocet Line across Exeter to include the Riviera Line.

=== Air ===
Exeter Airport is the only passenger airport in Devon and in 2019 was used by over one million people. Until 2020, Flybe had its headquarters at the airport. Destinations include various locations within the UK (London City, Manchester, Belfast, Edinburgh, etc.), as well as locations in Cyprus, Italy, Netherlands, Lapland, Portugal, Spain, France, Malta, Switzerland and Turkey.

== Education ==
Devon has a mostly comprehensive education system. There are 37 state and 23 independent secondary schools. There are three tertiary (FE) colleges and an agricultural college (Bicton College, near Budleigh Salterton). Torbay has eight state (with three grammar schools) and three independent secondary schools, and Plymouth has 17 state (with three grammar schools – two all-girls and one all-boys) and one independent school, Plymouth College. East Devon and Teignbridge have the largest school populations, with West Devon the smallest (with only two schools). Only one school in Exeter, Mid Devon, Torridge and North Devon have a sixth form – the schools in other districts mostly have sixth forms, with all schools in West Devon and East Devon having a sixth form.

Three universities are located in Devon, the University of Exeter (split between the Streatham Campus and St Luke's Campus, both in Exeter, and a campus in Cornwall); in Plymouth the University of Plymouth in Britain is present, along with the University of St Mark & St John to the city's north. The universities of Exeter and Plymouth have together formed the Peninsula College of Medicine and Dentistry which has bases in Exeter and Plymouth. There is also Schumacher College.

== Cuisine ==
The county has given its name to a number of culinary specialities. The Devonshire cream tea, involving scones, jam and clotted cream, is thought to have originated in Devon (though claims have also been made for neighbouring counties); in other countries, such as Australia and New Zealand, it is known as a "Devonshire tea". It has also been claimed that the pasty originated in Devon rather than Cornwall, with the first record of the pasty coming from Plymouth in 1509.

In October 2008, Devon was awarded Fairtrade County status by the Fairtrade Foundation.

== Sport ==
Devon has been home to a number of customs, such as its own form of Devon wrestling, similar in some ways to Cornish wrestling. As recently as the 19th century, a crowd of over 17,000 at Devonport, near Plymouth, attended a match between the champions of Devon and Cornwall. Another Devon sport was outhurling which was played in some regions until the 20th century (e.g. 1922, at Great Torrington). Other ancient customs which survive include Dartmoor step dancing, and "Crying The Neck".

Devon has three professional football teams, based in each of its most populous towns and cities. As of 2025, Plymouth Argyle F.C. and Exeter City F.C. compete in the EFL League One, whilst Torquay United F.C. compete in the National League South. Plymouth's highest Football League finish was fourth in the Second Division, which was achieved twice, in 1932 and 1953. Torquay and Exeter have never progressed beyond the third tier of the league; Torquay finished second on goal average in the Third Division (S) behind Sir Alf Ramsey's Ipswich Town in 1957. Exeter's highest position has been eighth in the Third Division (S). The county's biggest non-league clubs are Plymouth Parkway F.C. and Tiverton Town F.C. which compete in the Southern Football League Premier Division, and Bideford A.F.C., Exmouth Town F.C. and Tavistock A.F.C. which are in the Southern Football League Division One South and West.

Rugby Union is popular in Devon with over forty clubs under the banner of the Devon Rugby Football Union, many with various teams at senior, youth and junior levels. One club – Exeter Chiefs – play in the Aviva Premiership, winning the title in 2017 for the first time in their history after beating Wasps RFC in the final 23–20. Plymouth Albion who are, as of 2023, in the National League 1 (The third tier of English Professional Rugby Union).

There are five rugby league teams in Devon: Plymouth Titans, Exeter Centurions, and Devon Sharks from Torquay, North Devon Raiders from Barnstaple, and East Devon Eagles from Exmouth. They all play in the Rugby League Conference.

Plymouth City Patriots represent Devon in the British Basketball League. Formed in 2021, they replaced the former professional club, Plymouth Raiders, after the latter team were withdrawn from competition due to venue issues. Motorcycle speedway is also supported in the county, with both the Exeter Falcons and Plymouth Gladiators succeeding in the National Leagues in recent years.

The University of Exeter Hockey Club enter teams in both the Men's and Women's England Hockey Leagues.

Horse Racing is also popular in the county, with two National Hunt racecourses (Exeter and Newton Abbot), and numerous point to point courses. There are also many successful professional racehorse trainers based in Devon.

The county is represented in cricket by Devon County Cricket Club, who play at a Minor counties level.

== Notable Devonians ==
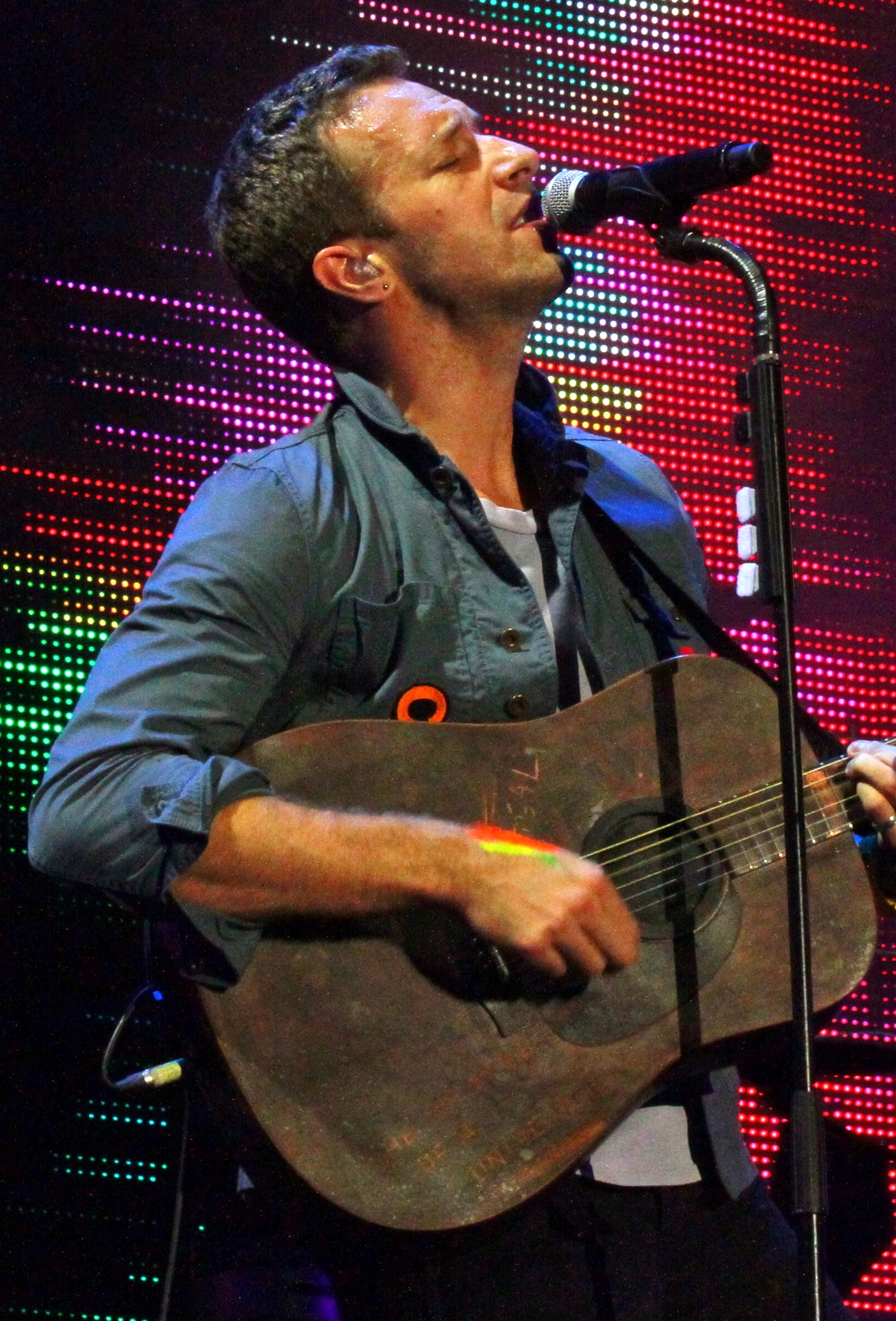
Chris Martin, lead singer of Coldplay

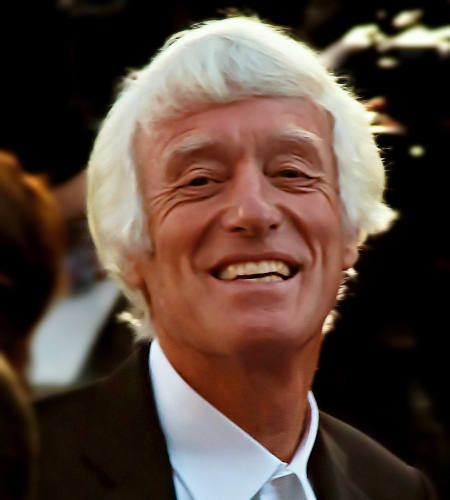
Roger Deakins, multi-award-winning cinematographer

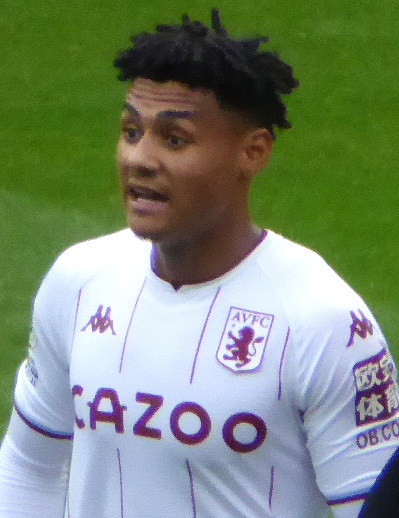
Ollie Watkins, plays football for England

Devon is known for its mariners, such as Sir Francis Drake, Sir Humphrey Gilbert, Sir Richard Grenville, Sir Walter Raleigh, Sir Francis Chichester and Sir William Robert Patrick Knox-Johnston. Henry Every, described as the most notorious pirate of the late 17th century, was probably born in the village of Newton Ferrers. John Oxenham (1536–1580) was a lieutenant of Drake but considered a pirate by the Spanish. Thomas Morton (1576–1647) was an avid Elizabethan outdoorsman probably born in Devon who became an attorney for The Council For New England, and built the New England fur-trading-plantation called Ma-Re Mount or Merrymount around a West Country-style Maypole, much to the displeasure of Pilgrim and Puritan colonists. Morton wrote a 1637 book New English Canaan about his experiences, partly in verse, and may have thereby become America's first poet to write in English. Another famous mariner and Devonian was Robert Falcon Scott, the leader of the unfortunate Terra Nova Expedition to reach the geographical South Pole.

The actor Matthew Goode was raised in Devon, and Bradley James, also an actor, was born there. The singer Joss Stone was brought up in Devon and frontman Chris Martin from the British rock group Coldplay was born there. Matt Bellamy, Dominic Howard and Chris Wolstenholme from the English group Muse all grew up in Devon and formed the band there. Dave Hill of rock band Slade was born in Flete House which is in the South Hams district of Devon. Singer-songwriter Ben Howard grew up in Totnes, a small town in Devon. Another famous Devonian is the model and actress Rosie Huntington-Whiteley, who was born in Plymouth and raised in Tavistock. The singer and songwriter Rebecca Newman was born and raised in Exmouth. Roger Deakins, called "the pre-eminent cinematographer of our time", was born and lives in Devon.

Ollie Watkins, professional footballer was born in Devon. Similarly, footballer Trevor Francis was raised in Devon. Swimmer Sharron Davies and diver Tom Daley were born in Plymouth. The Olympic runner Jo Pavey was born in Honiton. Peter Cook the satirist, writer and comedian was born in Torquay, Devon. Leicester Tigers and British and Irish Lions Rugby player Julian White was born and raised in Devon and now farms a herd of pedigree South Devon beef cattle. The dog breeder John "Jack" Russell was also from Devon. Jane McGrath, who married Australian cricketer Glenn McGrath was born in Paignton, her long battle with and subsequent death from breast cancer inspired the formation of the McGrath Foundation, which is one of Australia's leading charities.

Devon has also been the home, inspiration or base for a number of notable writers, artists, entrepreneurs and politicians. The poet Samuel Taylor Coleridge, the crime writers Agatha Christie and Bertram Fletcher Robinson, the Irish writer William Trevor, and the poet Ted Hughes each lived in Devon. The painter and founder of the Royal Academy, Sir Joshua Reynolds, was born in Devon. Chris Dawson, the billionaire owner of retailer The Range was born in Devon, where his business retains its head office in Plymouth. Devon has also been represented in the House of Commons by notable members of parliament (MPs) such as Nancy Astor, Gwyneth Dunwoody, Michael Foot and David Owen and the Prime Ministers Lord John Russell and Lord Palmerston.

== See also ==
- Category:Rivers of Devon
- Circular linhay
- Custos Rotulorum of Devon – Keepers of the Rolls
- Duchy of Cornwall
- Healthcare in Devon
- List of High Sheriffs of Devon
- List of English and Welsh endowed schools (19th century)#Devon
- List of hills of Devon
- List of Lord Lieutenants of Devon
- List of monastic houses in Devon
- List of MPs for Devon constituency
- List of Sites of Special Scientific Interest in Devon
- North Devon Coast
- Tamar Valley AONB
- West Country English
