= St Martin's Church, Sandford St Martin =

Church in Oxfordshire, England

St Martin’s Church, Sandford St Martin
- Parish Church of Saint Martin
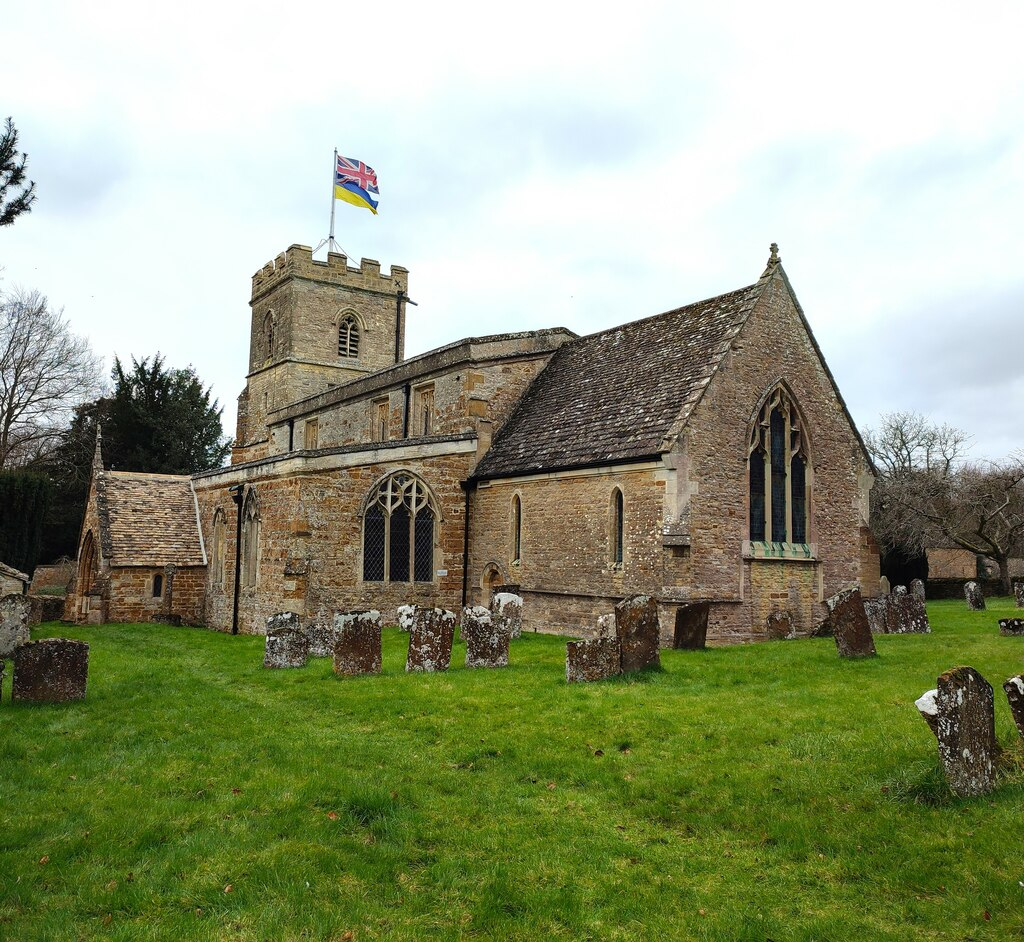
- St Martin’s Church, Sandford St Martin
- 51.937154°N 1.390082°W
- OS grid reference: SP 42028 26691
- Location: Sandford St Martin, Oxfordshire
- Country: England
- Denomination: Church of England

History
- Status: Parish church
- Dedication: Saint Martin of Tours

Architecture
- Functional status: Active
- Heritage designation: Grade II* listed
- Designated: 27 Aug 1956
- Style: Gothic

Administration
- Diocese: Oxford
- Archdeaconry: Dorchester
- Deanery: Woodstock
- Parish: Sandford St Martin

St Martin’s Church is a Church of England parish church in the village of Sandford St Martin, Oxfordshire, England. It serves both the village and the neighbouring hamlet of Ledwell, and has been part of the Barton Benefice of five parishes and six churches since 1975.

A Grade II* listed building recognised for its architectural and historic interest, the church is dedicated to Saint Martin of Tours.

== History and architecture ==
The earliest surviving parts of St Martin's Church date from the late 12th century, when a chapel of ease was founded within the parish of Steeple Barton. A north aisle of three bays was added around the turn of the 13th century. During the mid-13th century the church was extensively remodelled: a south aisle was added, the chancel was altered and a chancel arch introduced. The dedication of the church to Saint Martin of Tours in 1273 probably coincided with the conclusion of this work. The narrow north aisle was added in the 14th-century and retains its original windows, while the three-stage west tower has a Decorated Gothic three-light window of similar age. The south aisle was also remodelled in the 14th-century with richly moulded doorway and piscina. The chancel and south aisle were both provided with Perpendicular Gothic three-light east windows in the mid- to late-15th century.

In 1856 the diocesan architect for Oxford, George Edmund Street, who was one of the leading proponents of the Gothic Revival in Britain, was commissioned to rebuild the chancel as part of a wider restoration of the church. Conservative in his approach, Street made sure to incorporate the pre-existing Perpendicular three-light east window and other original fabric into his new structure.

The village was simply called Sandford until about 1884, when the suffix "St Martin" was added to distinguish it from Sandford-on-Thames elsewhere in Oxfordshire and Dry Sandford in what was then the neighbouring part of Berkshire.

=== Fittings ===
The 12th-century baptismal font with crude chevron carving, partly recut to fit an octagonal stem, is the oldest surviving fitting.

Painted on the wood panelling above the chancel arch is the Royal Arms of Queen Elizabeth I dated 1602.

Wall monuments commemorate Thomas Gylen (died 1637), William Croker (died 1709), John Lock (died 1714) and Vice Admiral James Sayer (died 1776), and there are five hatchments, including that of Henry Scott, 1st Earl of Deloraine, who is buried at the church.

A few fragments of medieval stained glass survive, reset into later glazing. The glass that fills the 15th century Perpendicular east window in the chancel dates most likely dates from Street's rebuilding in the mid-19th-century. It was manufactured by the Warwick-based firm of William Holland and depicts Christ with a chalice in the centre light, flanked by angels in the lights to either side.

The 14th century lancet window at the east end of the north aisle was reglazed in 1973 with a highly original depiction of the legend of Saint Martin dividing his cloak. The composition is reduced to the hand of god at the top, directing the hand of Martin to cut the red and blue material of his cloak with his dagger, while the beggar's hand reaches up from below to receive this benevolence. The window was designed by John Piper and manufactured by Patrick Reyntiens.

== Bells ==
The west tower has a ring of six bells. Nathaniel Bolter and Humphrey Keene of Buckingham cast the third and fourth bells in 1629. James Keene of Bedford, who had a foundry at Woodstock, cast the second and tenor bells in 1630. Mears and Stainbank of the Whitechapel Bell Foundry cast the treble and fifth bells in 1871. The church also has a Sanctus bell that Richard Keene of Woodstock cast in 1695.

== Parish ==
In 1975 the parish of Sandford St Martin was united with the Barton Benifice, which had been created in 1960 from the amalgamation of the Westcote Barton and Steeple Barton parishes. In 1977 the parish of Duns Tew was also added to the Benefice and, in 2015, Over Worton and Nether Worton parishes became the fifth and sixth parishes to be joined.

== Gallery ==
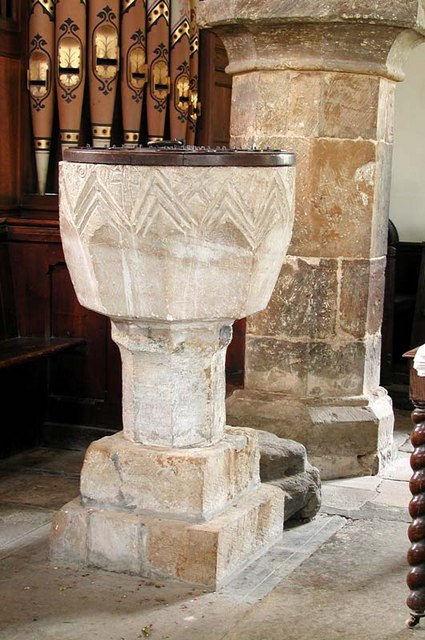
12th century baptismal font

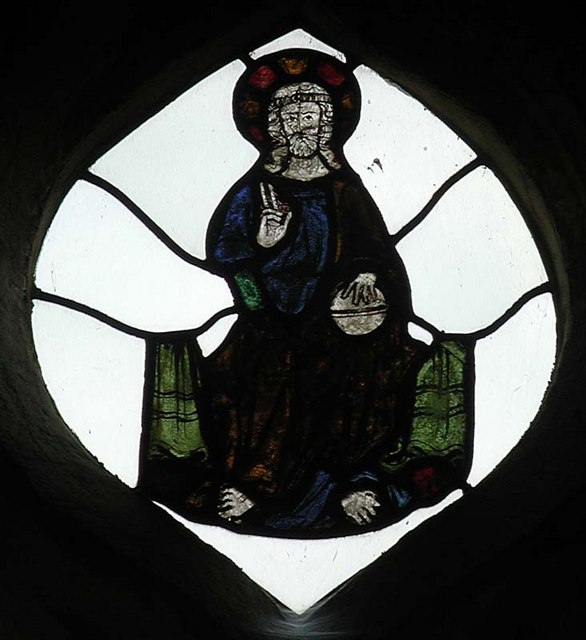
14th-century stained glass of Christ the King

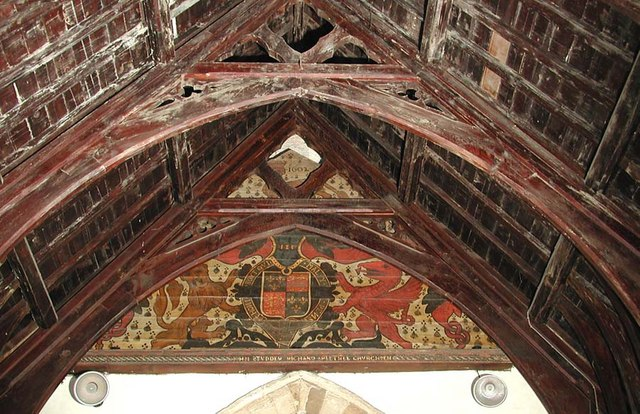
Arms of Elizabeth I above the chancel arch

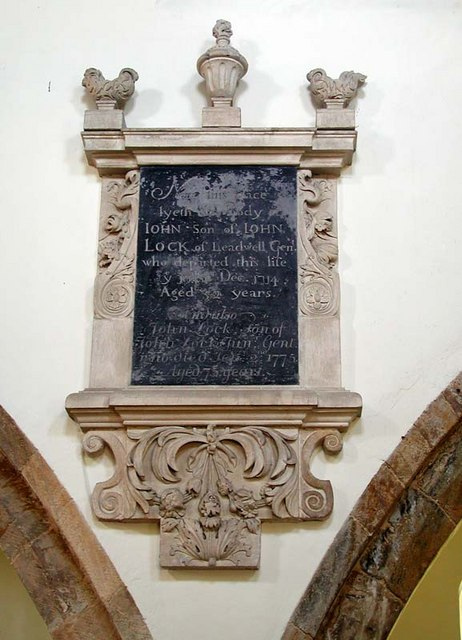
Wall monument to Jock Lock (d.1714)

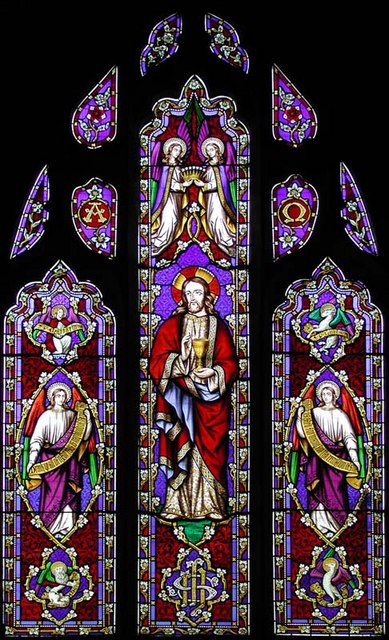
Window by William Holland in chancel

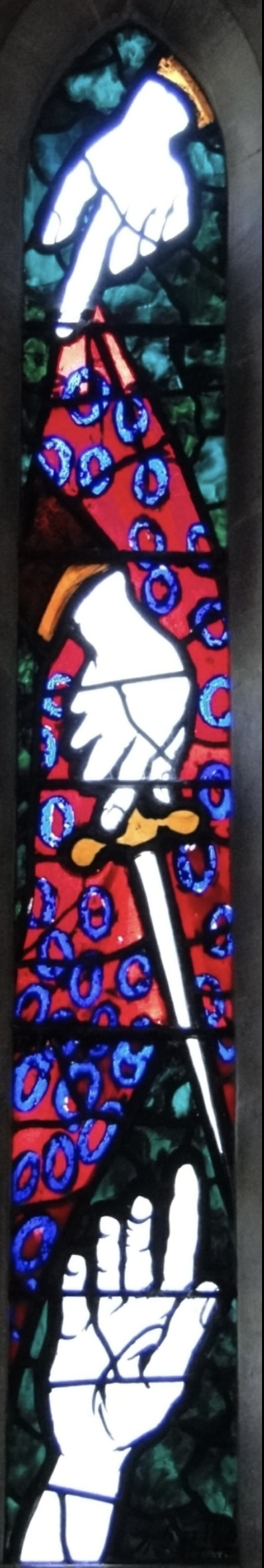
Window by John Piper in north aisle

== Sources ==
- Crossley, Alan; Baggs, A. P.; Colvin, Christina; Colvin, H. M.; Cooper, Janet; Day, C. J.; Selwyn, Nesta; Tomkinson, A., eds. (1983). "Parishes:Sandford St. Martin". A History of the County of Oxford. Victoria County History. Vol. 11. pp. 169–181. ISBN 978-0-19722-758-9.
