= Steeple Barton =

Civil parish in Oxfordshire, England

Coordinates: 51.922°N 1.351°W

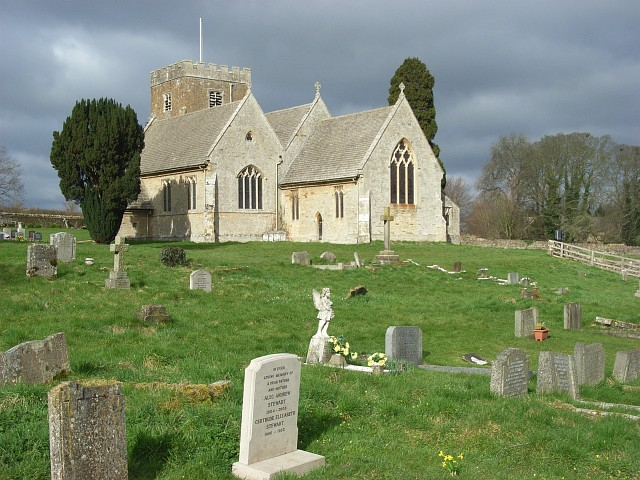
- St Mary the Virgin parish church

- Location within Oxfordshire
- Population: 1,523 (2011 Census)
- OS grid reference: SP4425
- Civil parish: Steeple Barton
- District: West Oxfordshire
- Shire county: Oxfordshire
- Region: South East
- Country: England
- Sovereign state: United Kingdom
- Post town: Bicester
- Postcode district: OX25
- Dialling code: 01869
- Police: Thames Valley
- Fire: Oxfordshire
- Ambulance: South Central
- UK Parliament: Banbury
- Website: Steeple Barton Parish Council

Steeple Barton is a civil parish and scattered settlement on the River Dorn in West Oxfordshire, about 8 1/2 miles (13.7 km) east of Chipping Norton, a similar distance west of Bicester and 9 miles (14 km) south of Banbury. Most of the parish's population lives in the village of Middle Barton, about 1 mile (1.6 km) northwest of the settlement of Steeple Barton. The 2011 Census recorded the parish's population as 1,523. Much of the parish's eastern boundary is formed by the former turnpike between Oxford and Banbury, now classified the A4260 road. The minor road between Middle Barton and Kiddington forms part of the western boundary. Field boundaries form most of the rest of the boundaries of the parish.

== Archaeology ==
Near Barton Lodge are two Hoar Stones that are the remains of Neolithic chamber tombs.

== Manor ==
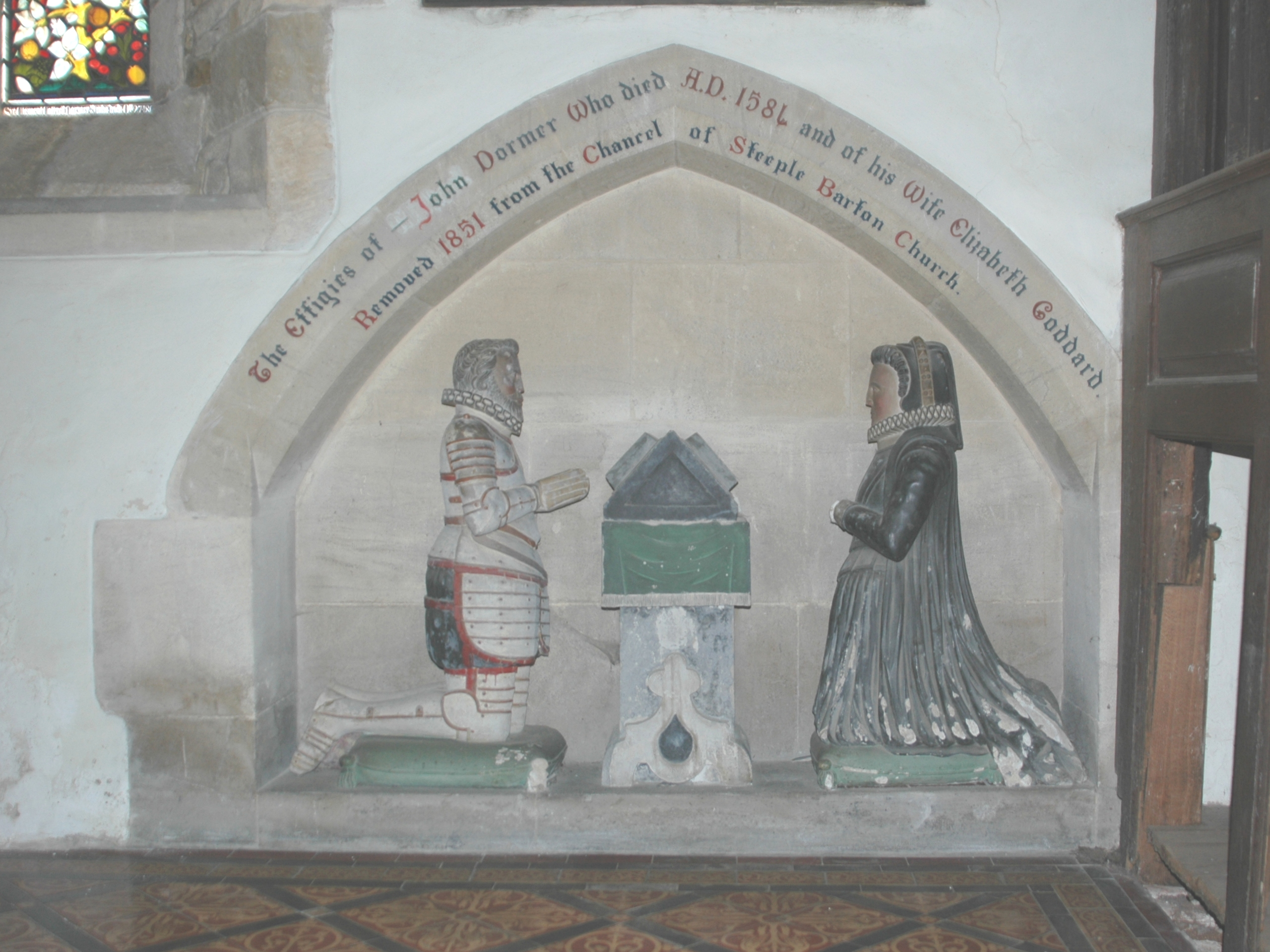
Monument to John Dormer (died 1581) and his wife, now at SS. Leonard and James, Rousham. It was in St Mary the Virgin's parish church at Steeple Barton until 1851.

The Domesday Book of 1086 records that a manor of 10 hides at Barton was one of many English manors under the feudal overlordship of Odo, Bishop of Bayeux. Late in the 12th century Thomas St John had a set of fish ponds made that were fed by the River Dorn. Their remains are visible about 990 yards (910 m) north of the parish church. The former manor house at Sesswell's Barton was built in about 1570 for John Dormer and altered for the recusant Ralph Sheldon in 1678–79. The house was remodelled between 1849 and about 1862 to Tudor Revival designs by the architect SS Teulon. In about 1860 it was renamed Barton Abbey on the false assumption that the Augustinian Osney Abbey had a cell here. The house was altered again in either the 1890s or the early years of the 20th century.

Philip Constable of Everingham, Yorkshire was a Royalist in the English Civil War who was connected with Steeple Barton and was made a baronet in 1642. After the Parliamentarians won the war, they deprived him of all his estates. He died in 1644 and is buried in the south aisle of St Mary's parish church. Like the Sheldons, later members of the Constable family were recusants, including Humphrey Constable who was reported as such in 1663 and 1682 and Michael Constable who was reported in 1706.

== Parish church ==
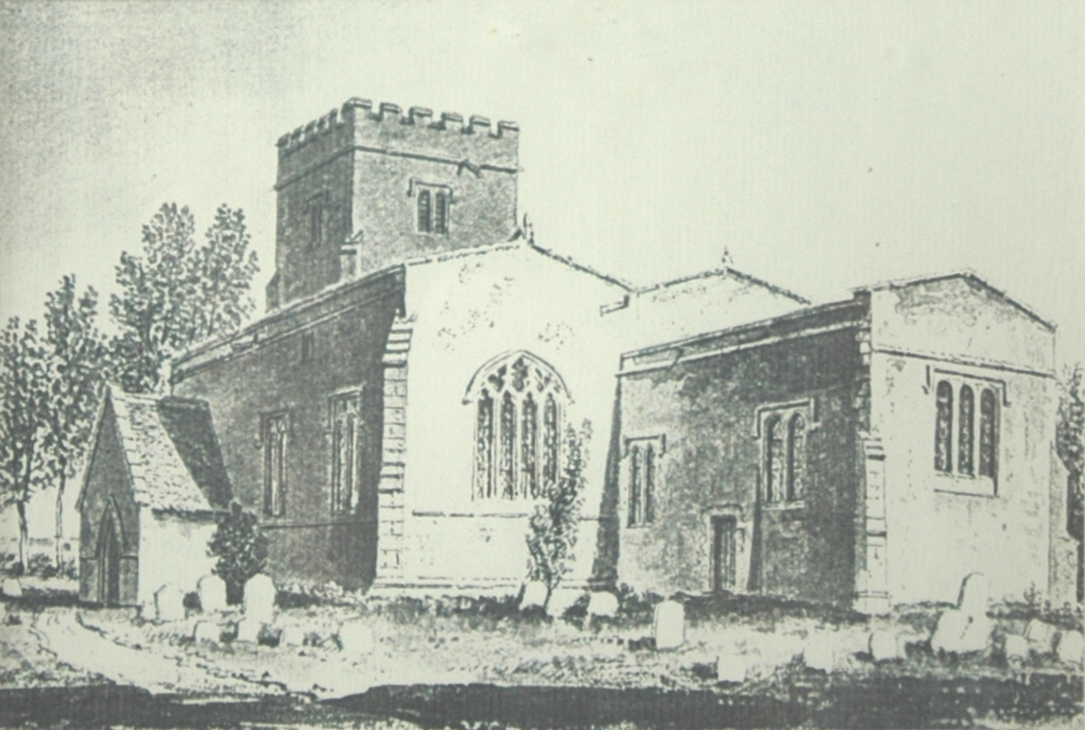
St Mary the Virgin parish church before it was largely demolished and replaced in 1850

The Church of England parish church of Saint Mary the Virgin had been built by 1190, by which time it had been given to Osney Abbey. Little of the original building is recognisable except the Norman font. The south aisle was added in the 14th century. Its surviving original features include the south porch and five-bay arcade, both of which are Decorated Gothic. The Perpendicular Gothic west tower was added in the 15th century. The chancel was rebuilt and the nave and south aisle drastically restored in 1850–51 under the direction of the Gothic Revival architect J.C. Buckler.

The tower has a ring of five bells. Richard Keene of Woodstock cast the treble and second bells in 1698. Charles and George Mears of the Whitechapel Bell Foundry cast the remainder including the tenor bell in 1851. St Mary's Vicarage was designed by SS Teulon and built in 1856. St Mary's was a dependent chapelry of Sandford St. Martin until the 16th century. In 1960 St Mary's Benefice was merged with that of Westcott Barton, and in 1977 this united benefice was combined with the parishes of Duns Tew and Sandford St Martin. In March 2015 the benefice was merged with that of Over Worton and Nether Worton to form the Benefice of Westcote Barton with Steeple Barton, Duns Tew and Sandford St Martin and Over with Nether Worton, also called the Barton Benefice.

== Social and economic history ==
Westcott and Middle Barton Inclosure Act 1795
- Act of Parliament
- Parliament of Great Britain
- Long title: An act for dividing and inclosing the open and common fields, common meadows, common pastures, commons, waste, and other commonable lands and grounds, within the parish and precincts of Westcott Barton, and within the liberty and precincts of Middle Barton, in the parish of Steeple Barton, in the county of Oxford.
- Citation: 35 Geo. 3. c. 19 Pr.
- Territorial extent: Great Britain

Dates
- Royal assent: 27 March 1795
- Commencement: 27 March 1795 (Note: The Acts of Parliament (Commencement) Act 1793.)

Status: Current legislation

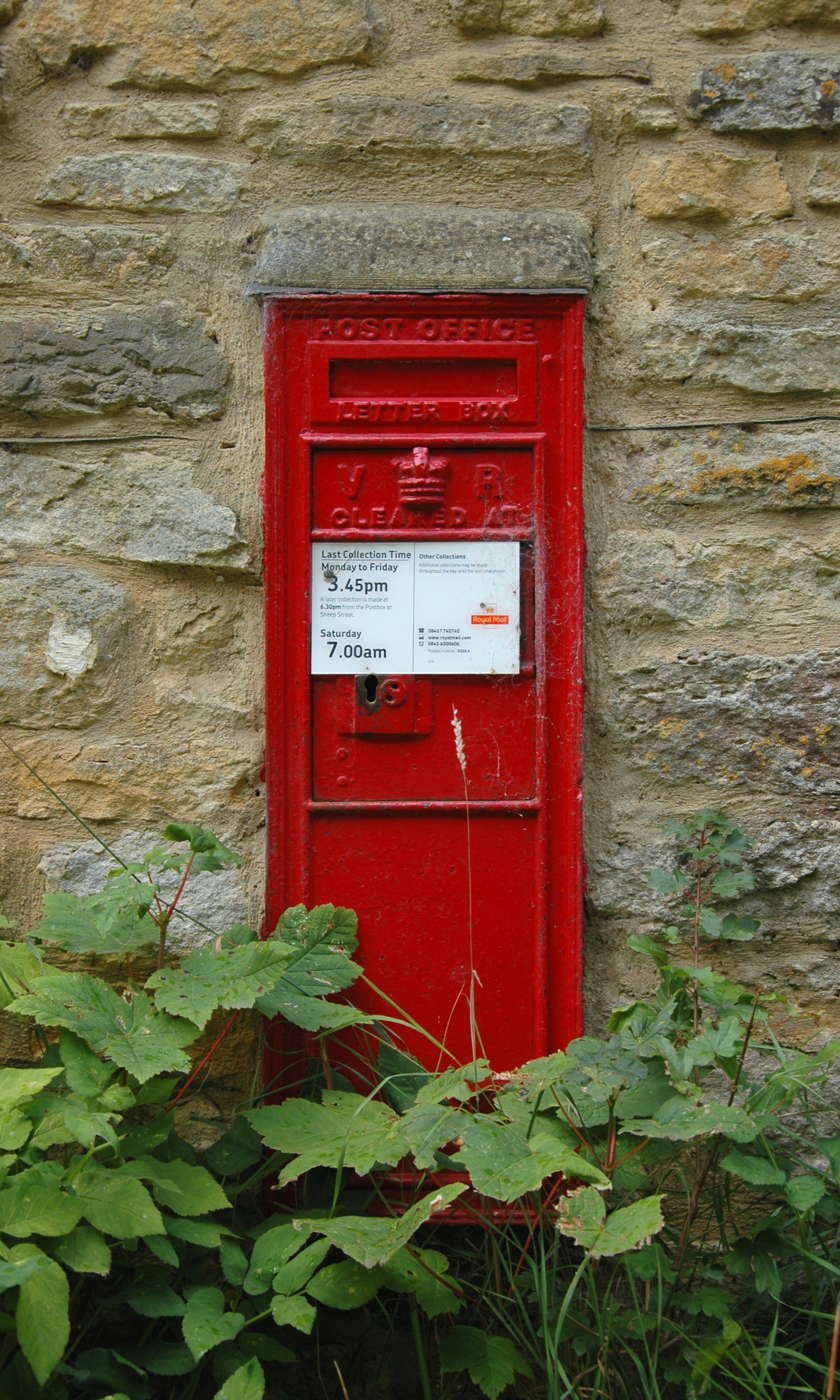
Victorian era post office wall box outside a cottage in Back Lane

Anne Greene was born in the parish in 1628 and later became a domestic servant at the manor house in the neighbouring parish of Duns Tew. In 1650 she was convicted of infanticide on apparently doubtful evidence, was hanged at Oxford Castle but survived and was pardoned. The agricultural lands of Steeple Barton and Westcott Barton were worked as a single unit. An open field system of farming prevailed in the two parishes until an inclosure act for their common lands, the Westcott and Middle Barton Inclosure Act 1795 (35 Geo. 3. c. 19 Pr.), was implemented in 1796. The main road between Bicester and Enstone traverses the parish east–west. It was turnpiked in 1793, disturnpiked in 1876 and is now classified the B4030 road.

== Sport and leisure ==
Steeple Barton parish has a Non-League football club, Middle Barton F.C., that was founded in 1928. Its home ground is at Middle Barton Sports and Social Club on Worton Road. The parish also has a tennis club, a bowls club and a drama group.

== Notable people ==
- Anne Greene, scullery maid who survived her own hanging in 1650
- W.G. Hoskins, author of The Making of the English Landscape, lived in Steeple Barton

== Sources and further reading ==
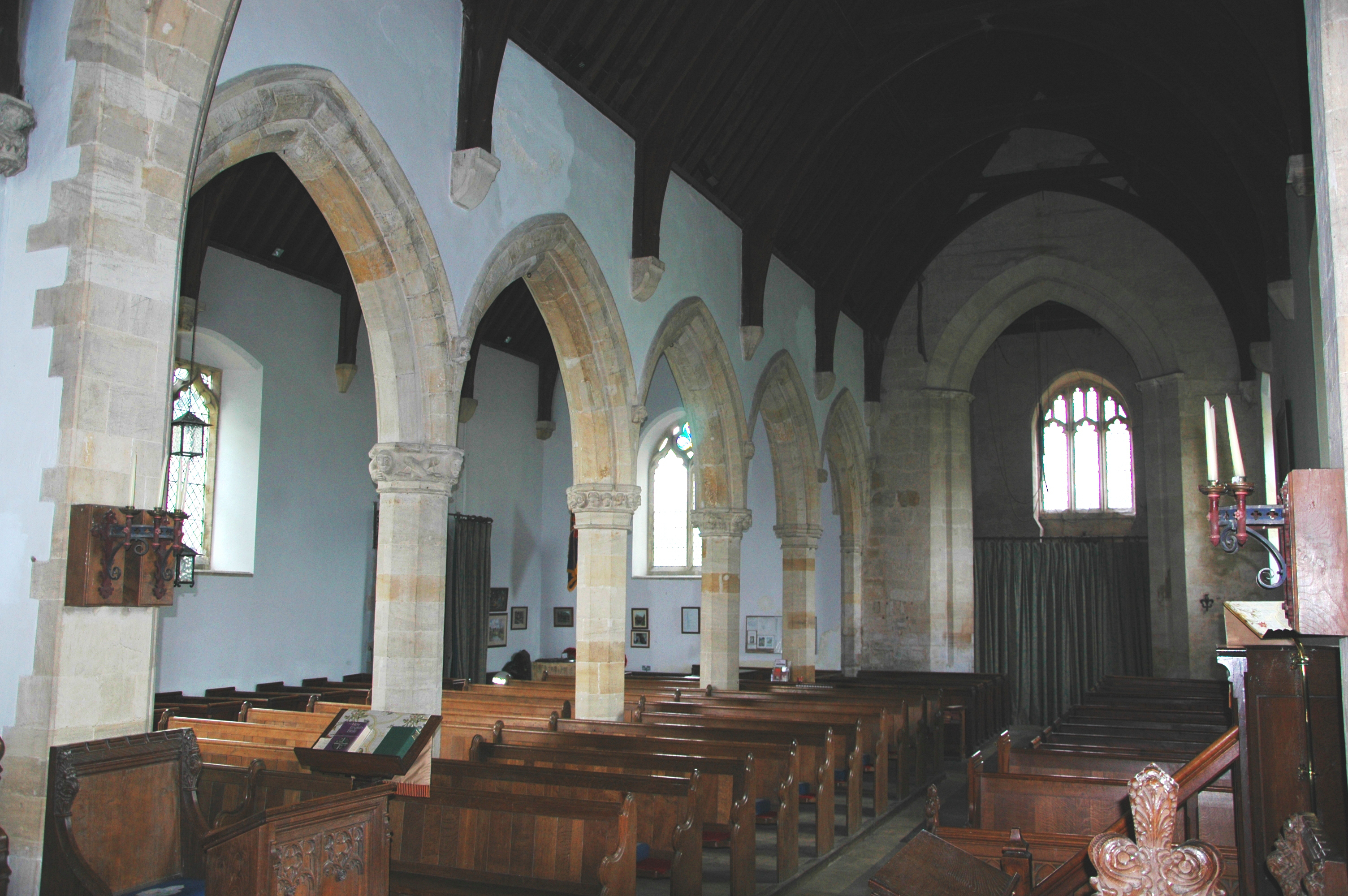
Interior of St Mary the Virgin parish church, showing 14th century Decorated Gothic arcade

- Alsager, Richard Vian. "Anne Greene". Dictionary of National Biography, 1885–1900. Vol. 23. London: Smith, Elder & Co.
- Crossley, Alan (ed.); Baggs, A.P.; Colvin, Christina; Colvin, H.M.; Cooper, Janet; Day, C.J.; Selwyn, Nesta; Tomkinson, A. (1983). A History of the County of Oxford. Victoria County History. Vol. 11: Wootton Hundred (northern part). London: Oxford University Press for the Institute of Historical Research. pp. 59–75. ISBN 978-0-19722-758-9.
- Maclagan, Michael (1947). "The Family of Dormer in Oxfordshire and Buckinghamshire" (PDF). Oxoniensia. XI–XII. Oxford Architectural and Historical Society: 90–101. ISSN 0308-5562.
- Sherwood, Jennifer; Pevsner, Nikolaus (1974). Oxfordshire. The Buildings of England. Harmondsworth: Penguin Books. p. 788. ISBN 0-14-071045-0.
