= Over Worton =

Hamlet in Oxfordshire, England

Coordinates: 51.959°N 1.376°W

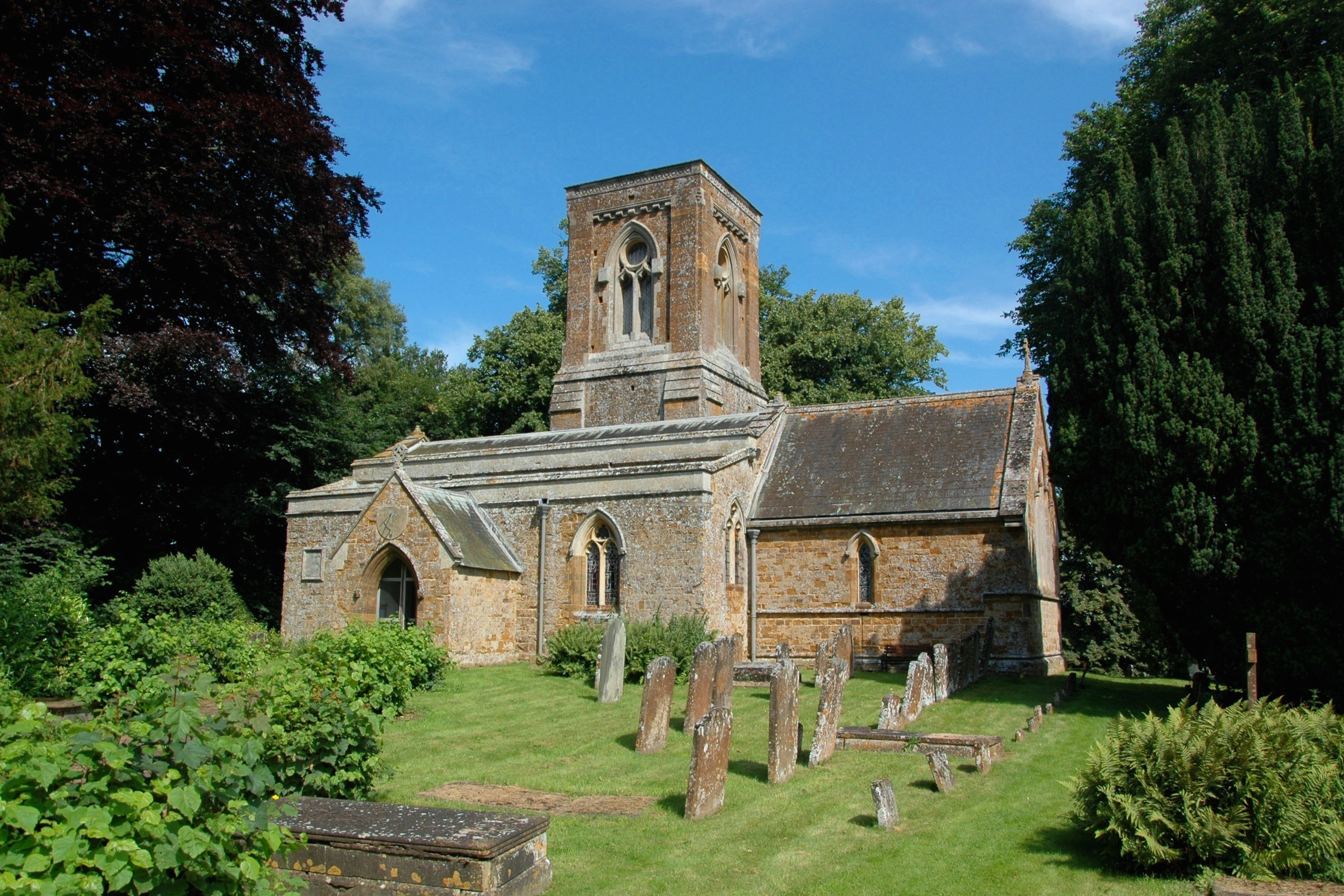
- Holy Trinity parish church

- Location within Oxfordshire
- OS grid reference: SP4329
- Civil parish: Worton
- District: West Oxfordshire
- Shire county: Oxfordshire
- Region: South East
- Country: England
- Sovereign state: United Kingdom
- Post town: Chipping Norton
- Postcode district: OX7
- Dialling code: 01608
- Police: Thames Valley
- Fire: Oxfordshire
- Ambulance: South Central
- UK Parliament: Witney

Over Worton is a hamlet in the civil parish of Worton, in the West Oxfordshire district, in the county of Oxfordshire, England, about 7 miles (11 km) south of Banbury and 7 1/2 miles (12 km) east of Chipping Norton. In 1931 the parish had a population of 72. On 1 April 1932 the parish was abolished and merged with Nether Worton to form "Worton".

== Archaeology ==
Just north of Holy Trinity parish churchyard is an Anglo-Saxon hlaew (barrow), about 59 feet (18 m) in diameter and 6 feet 7 inches (2 m) high. It is a Scheduled Ancient Monument. Worton has the remains of a medieval village cross. In the 20th century it was restored as the parish war memorial.

== Manor ==
The Domesday Book records that until 1066 one Leofgeat held the manor of Ortune, probably at what is now Nether Worton. After the Norman Conquest of England an estate of three hides and half a yardland at Worton passed to William the Conqueror's half-brother Odo of Bayeux. By 1086 there were 15 households consisting of 10 smallholders and five villagers.

== Parish church ==
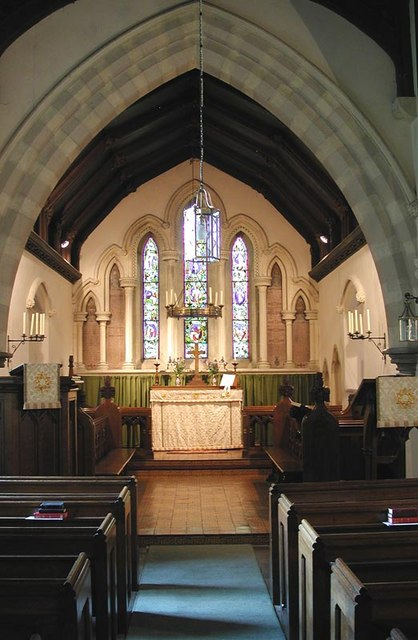
The chancel of Holy Trinity parish church. The east wall is filled by an arcade of seven stepped lancets, the middle three of which have windows.

Over Worton has had a parish church since at least the 13th century. The earliest known record of it is from 1254. It had a Norman font, which is now in St John's church, Hempton. In the 1820s Over Worton's curate was the evangelical priest Walter Mayers, who in the 1800s had taught classics at Great Ealing School in what was then Middlesex. His pupils had included John Henry Newman, who then went up to Oxford University. In 1824 Newman was ordained as a Church of England deacon at Christ Church Cathedral, Oxford. It was at Over Worton in 1824 that Newman preached his first sermon, and thereafter served on several occasions. In the 1840s the curate was William Wilson, an evangelical whose family had owned the manor of Over Worton since 1799. In the 1840s Wilson had the medieval church demolished and the present Church of England parish church of the Holy Trinity built in its place. It is a Gothic revival building, designed by the architect JM Derick and completed in 1844. The north tower was added in 1849 and has two bells. In the churchyard east of the chancel is a pair of stone medieval coffin lids that may be a remnant from the previous church. Other remnants are a memorial tablet and effigy inside the present church. The tablet is in memory of the lawyer Edmund Meese, who died in 1617. The effigy is of a late 16th- or early 17th-century lawyer, and may also represent Edmund Meese. Until 2015 Holy Trinity was part of a single benefice with St James' church, Nether Worton. In March 2015 Nether Worton and Over Worton parishes became part of the Benefice of Westcote Barton with Steeple Barton, Duns Tew and Sandford St. Martin and Over with Nether Worton, also called the Barton Benefice.

== Sources ==
- Crossley, Alan (ed.); Baggs, A.P.; Colvin, Christina; Colvin, H.M.; Cooper, Janet; Day, C.J.; Selwyn, Nesta; Tomkinson, A. (1983). A History of the County of Oxford. Victoria County History. Vol. 11: Wootton Hundred (northern part). London: Oxford University Press for the Institute of Historical Research. pp. 293–300. ISBN 978-0-19722-758-9.
- Harden, Donald (1954). "Scheduled Monuments in Oxfordshire" (PDF). Oxoniensia. XIX. Oxford Architectural and Historical Society: 137–145.
- Sherwood, Jennifer; Pevsner, Nikolaus (1974). Oxfordshire. The Buildings of England. Harmondsworth: Penguin Books. pp. 730–731. ISBN 0-14-071045-0.
