= River Dorn =

River in Oxfordshire, England

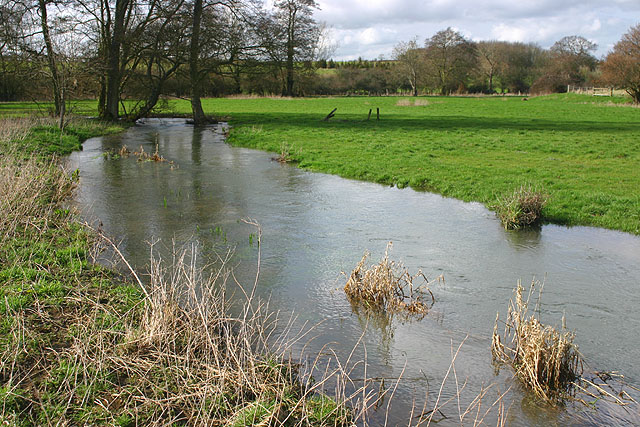
The River Dorn in Steeple Barton parish, about 1.2 miles (2 km) south of the village

The River Dorn is a river in Oxfordshire, England, that is a tributary of the River Glyme. The river rises from the limestone uplands of north Oxfordshire, about 1.5 miles (2.4 km) east of Chipping Norton (51.9587°N 1.4823°W), and flows southeast past Little Tew; through Sandford St. Martin, where it forms part of Sandford Park's gardens; and through the Bartons: Westcott Barton, Middle Barton, where Cockley Brook joins it, and Steeple Barton — before it joins the River Glyme just east of Wootton (51.8710°N 1.3554°W).

The River Dorn flows though the Soho Farmhouse members club, part of Soho House (club) between Little Tew and Stanford St Martin.
