= Duns Tew =

Village in Oxfordshire, England

Coordinates: 51.954°N 01.336°W

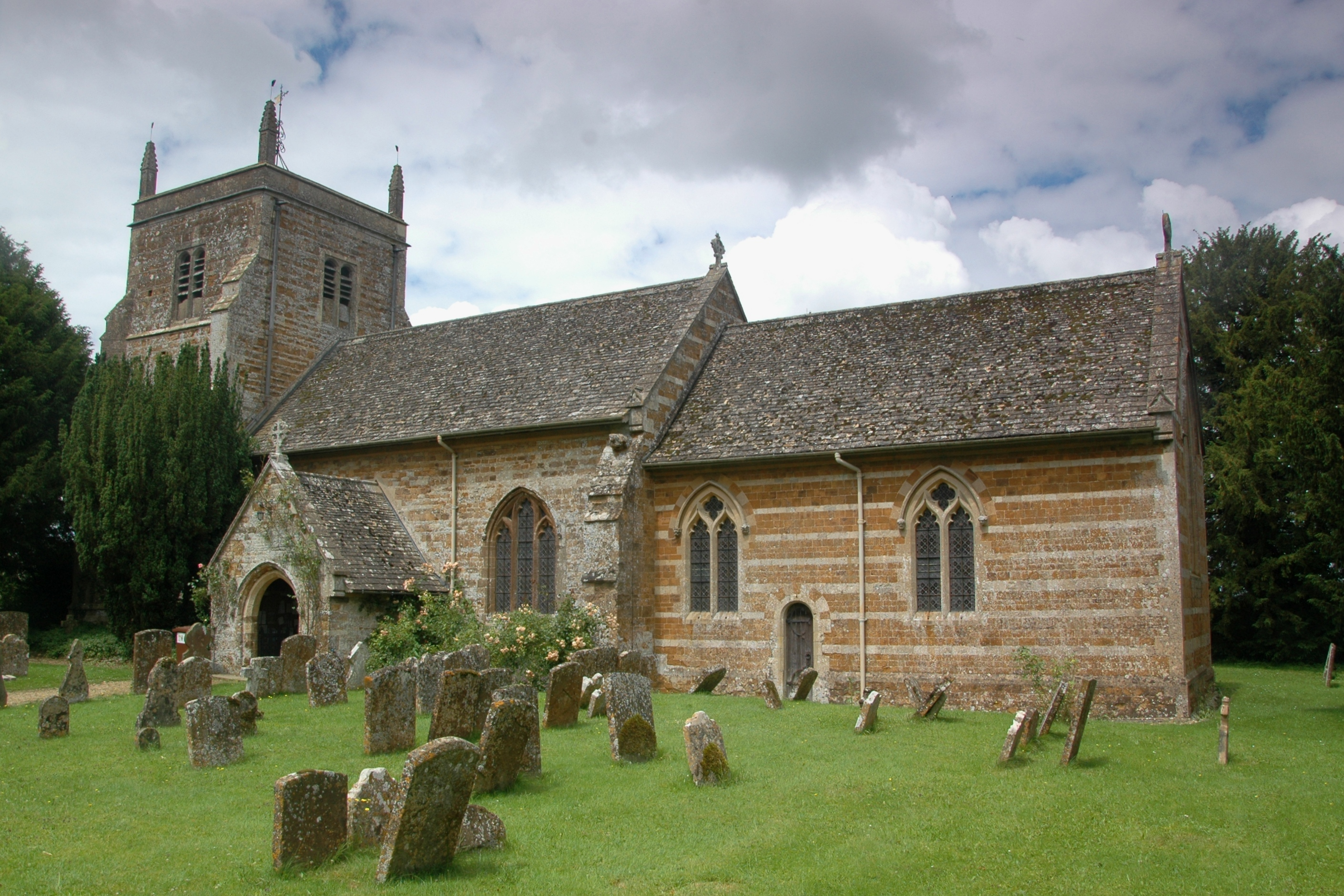
- St Mary Magdalene parish church

- Location within Oxfordshire
- Area: 7.07 km^{2} (2.73 sq mi)
- Population: 478 (2011 census)
  - Density: 68/km^{2} (180/sq mi)
- OS grid reference: SP4528
- District: Cherwell
- Shire county: Oxfordshire
- Region: South East
- Country: England
- Sovereign state: United Kingdom
- Post town: Bicester
- Postcode district: OX25
- Dialling code: 01869
- Police: Thames Valley
- Fire: Oxfordshire
- Ambulance: South Central
- UK Parliament: Banbury
- Website: Duns Tew Oxfordshire

Duns Tew is an English village and civil parish about 7 1/2 miles (12 km) south of Banbury in Oxfordshire. The 2011 census recorded the parish's population as 478. With nearby Great Tew and Little Tew, Duns Tew is one of the three villages known collectively as "The Tews". A 'tew' is believed to be an ancient term for a ridge of land.

== Manor ==
Before the Norman Conquest of England, Leofwine of Barton held the manor of Duns Tew along with those of Dunthrop, Little Tew and Westcott Barton. The Domesday Book of 1086 records four estates in the parish, of which the two largest belonged to Robert D'Oyly and Robert de Stafford. In addition, Gilbert de Magminot, Bishop of Lisieux held an estate of three hides and Odo, Bishop of Bayeux and half-brother of William I held an estate of one hide. The present manor house contains 17th-century remnants and a wing added in the 19th century, but the main part of the present house is 18th-century. The house has a 17th-century dovecote. Priory Court, a 19th-century house east of the church, used to be the vicarage.

== Church and chapel ==
=== Church of England ===
The Church of England parish church of St Mary Magdalene existed in the 12th century, from which period the font and one Early English Gothic lancet window in the chancel survive. The north aisle was added late in the 13th or early in the 14th century. The tower, south porch and many of the present windows were added late in the 14th or early in the 15th century. The tower collapsed in 1647, damaging the south side of the church. It was rebuilt in 1664–65. In 1861–62 Sir George Gilbert Scott completely rebuilt the chancel and north aisle and partly rebuilt the south wall of the nave.

The tower has a ring of five bells. Richard Keene of Woodstock cast the second bell in 1668 and the third bell in 1694. Matthew III Bagley of Chacombe, Northamptonshire cast the tenor bell in 1768. Robert II Wells of Aldbourne, Wiltshire cast the treble bell in 1790. Charles and George Mears of the Whitechapel Bell Foundry cast the fourth bell in 1858. St Mary Magdalene's has also a Sanctus bell that Thomas II Mears of Whitechapel cast in 1828. In 1977 the parishes of Duns Tew and Sandford St. Martin were merged with the Benefice of Westcott Barton and Steeple Barton. In March 2015 the benefice was merged with that of Over Worton and Nether Worton to form the Benefice of Westcote Barton with Steeple Barton, Duns Tew and Sandford St Martin and Over with Nether Worton, also called the Barton Benefice.

=== Baptist ===
A Baptist chapel was completed in 1809.

== Economic and social history ==
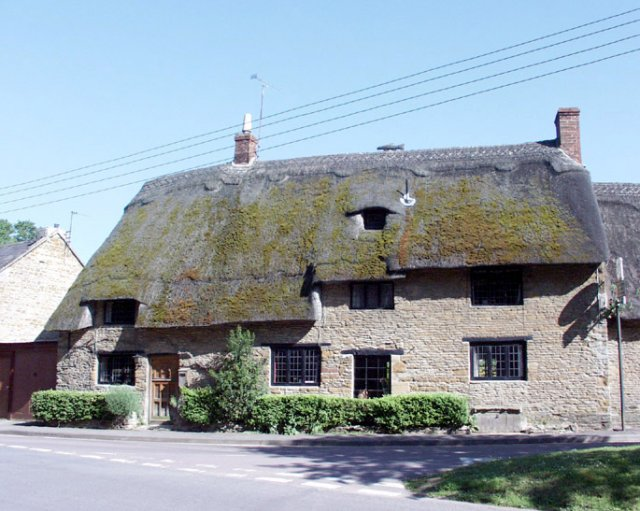
The Ridge House, opposite the parish church, was built in the first half of the 17th century

The parish had a watermill by 1279. It was still recorded in 1618 but seems to have disappeared by 1722. In 1650 Anne Greene, a domestic servant at Duns Tew manor house, was convicted of the infanticide of her stillborn child. She was hanged at Oxford Castle but survived after being presumed dead and was given a free pardon. Most of the parish was farmed under two separate open field systems until 1794, when the common lands were enclosed.

A Sunday School for the parish was founded in 1798 and a day school had been added by 1808. By 1818 the Sunday school had been converted to the National School system. Sir George Dashwood provided and equipped a school building in 1830. The school outgrew its building and in 1874 new premises were completed with capacity for 100 children. In 1928 it was reorganised as a junior school, with senior pupils going to the school at Steeple Aston. The number of pupils declined and in 1969 Duns Tew school was closed. Since 1970 the building has served as Duns Tew village hall. On 23 February 1976 BBC Nationwide ran a feature on the workshop of luthier David Rubio at the Ridgehouse.

== Amenities ==
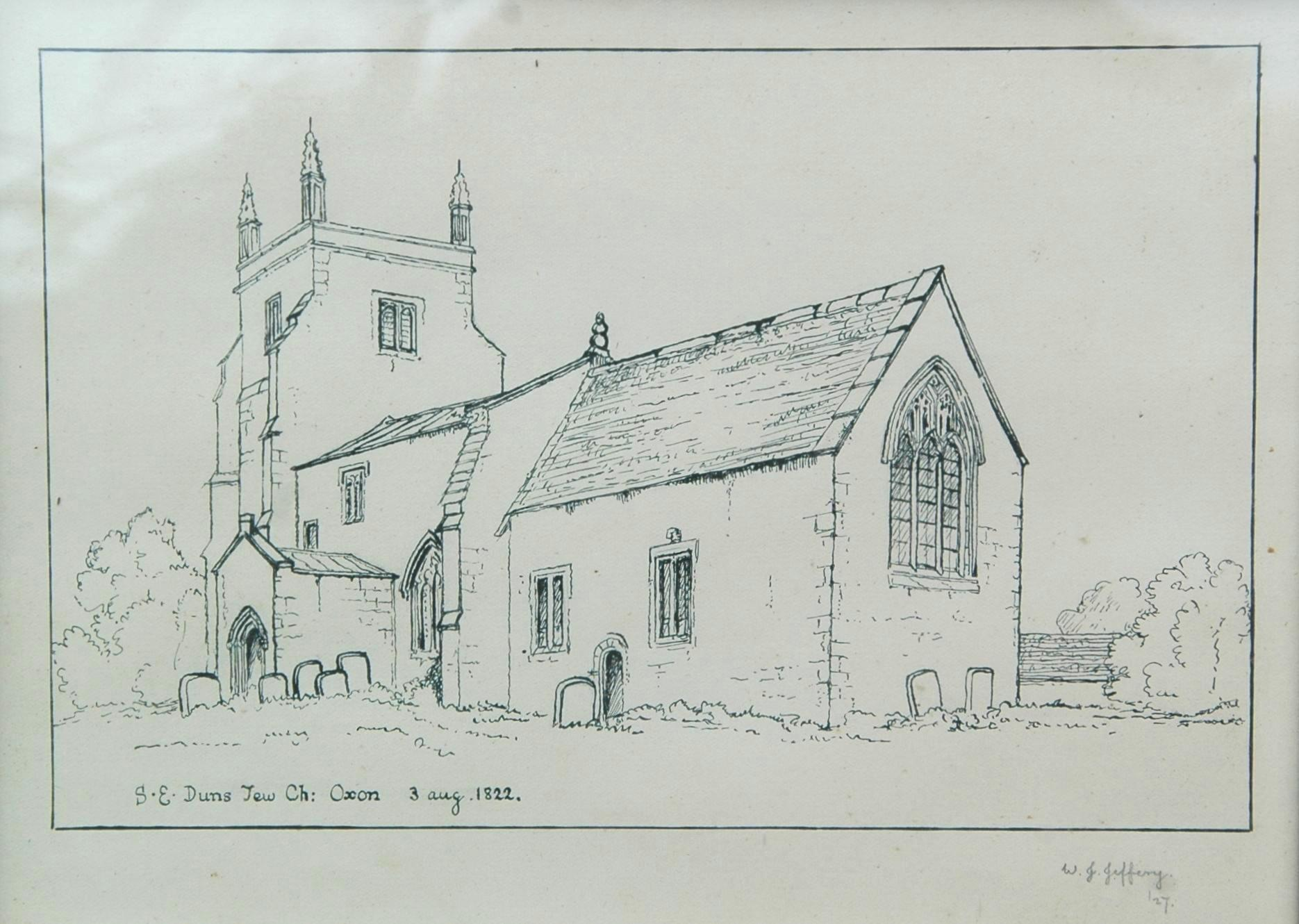
Sketch of the parish church from the southeast in 1822, showing the Perpendicular Gothic east window that it had until the church was rebuilt in 1861

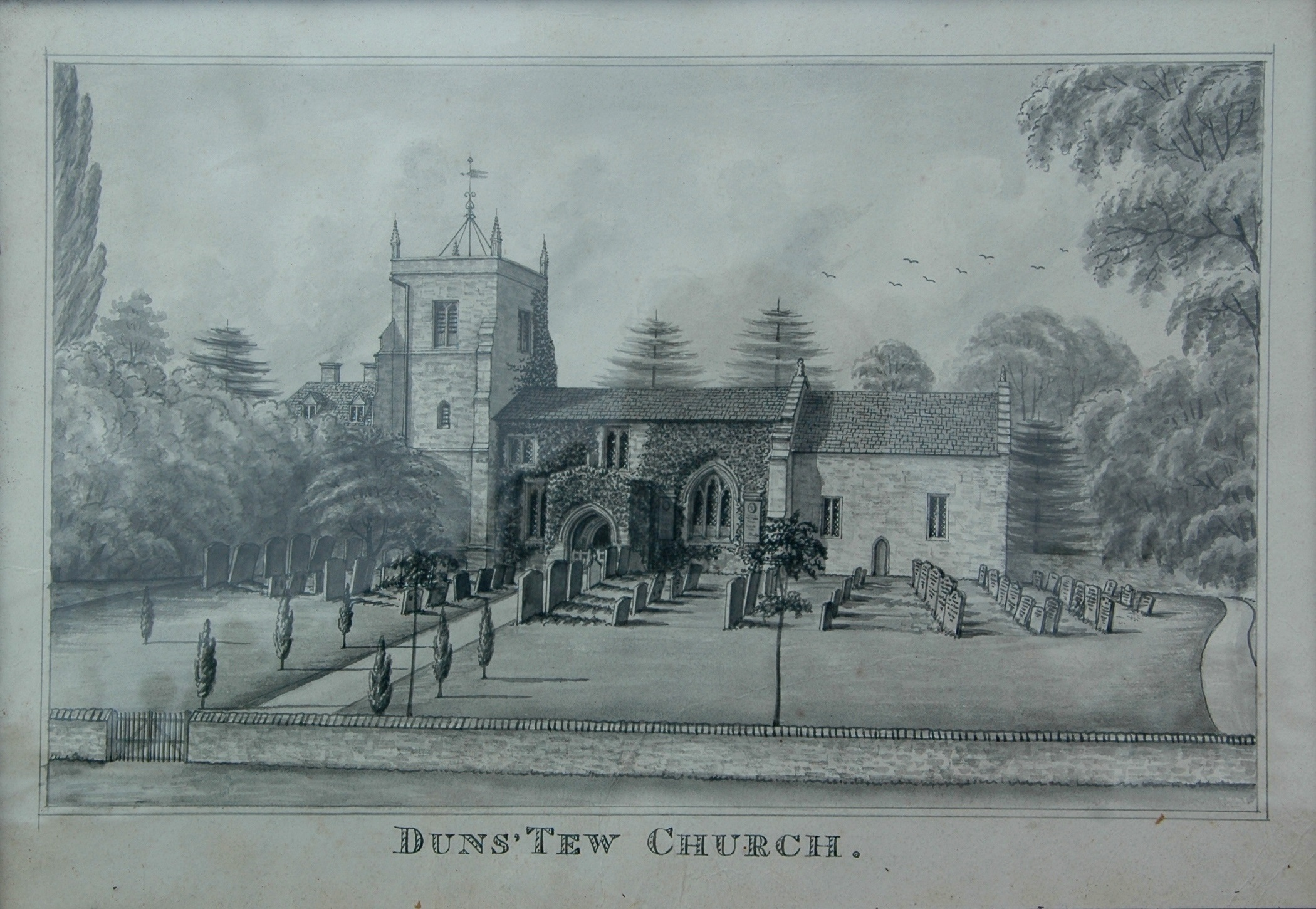
Undated engraving of the parish church from the south, possibly 18th century, showing its appearance before its Victorian restoration

Although there are no shops, Duns Tew has a public house, the White Horse. Duns Tew has a Community Action Group.

== Sources ==
- Alsager, R.V. (1890). "Greene, Anne" . In Stephen, Leslie; Lee, Sidney (eds.). Dictionary of National Biography. Vol. 23. London: Smith, Elder & Co. p. 62.
- Baggs, A.P.; Colvin, Christina; Colvin, H.M.; Cooper, Janet; Day, C.J.; Selwyn, Nesta; Tomkinson, A. (1983). Crossley, Alan (ed.). A History of the County of Oxford. Victoria County History. Vol. 11: Wootton Hundred (northern part). London: Oxford University Press for the Institute of Historical Research. pp. 209–222. ISBN 978-0-19722-758-9.
- Sherwood, Jennifer; Pevsner, Nikolaus (1974). Oxfordshire. The Buildings of England. Harmondsworth: Penguin Books. pp. 590–591. ISBN 0-14-071045-0.
- Taunt, Henry (1860–1922). "Tew Manor House, Duns Tew, Duns Tew, Oxfordshire". Viewfinder. Historic England. – historic photograph of Duns Tew Manor and the west tower of St Mary Magdalene parish church
