= Wootton, West Oxfordshire =

Village in Oxfordshire, England

Coordinates: 51.878°N 1.364°W

Wootton
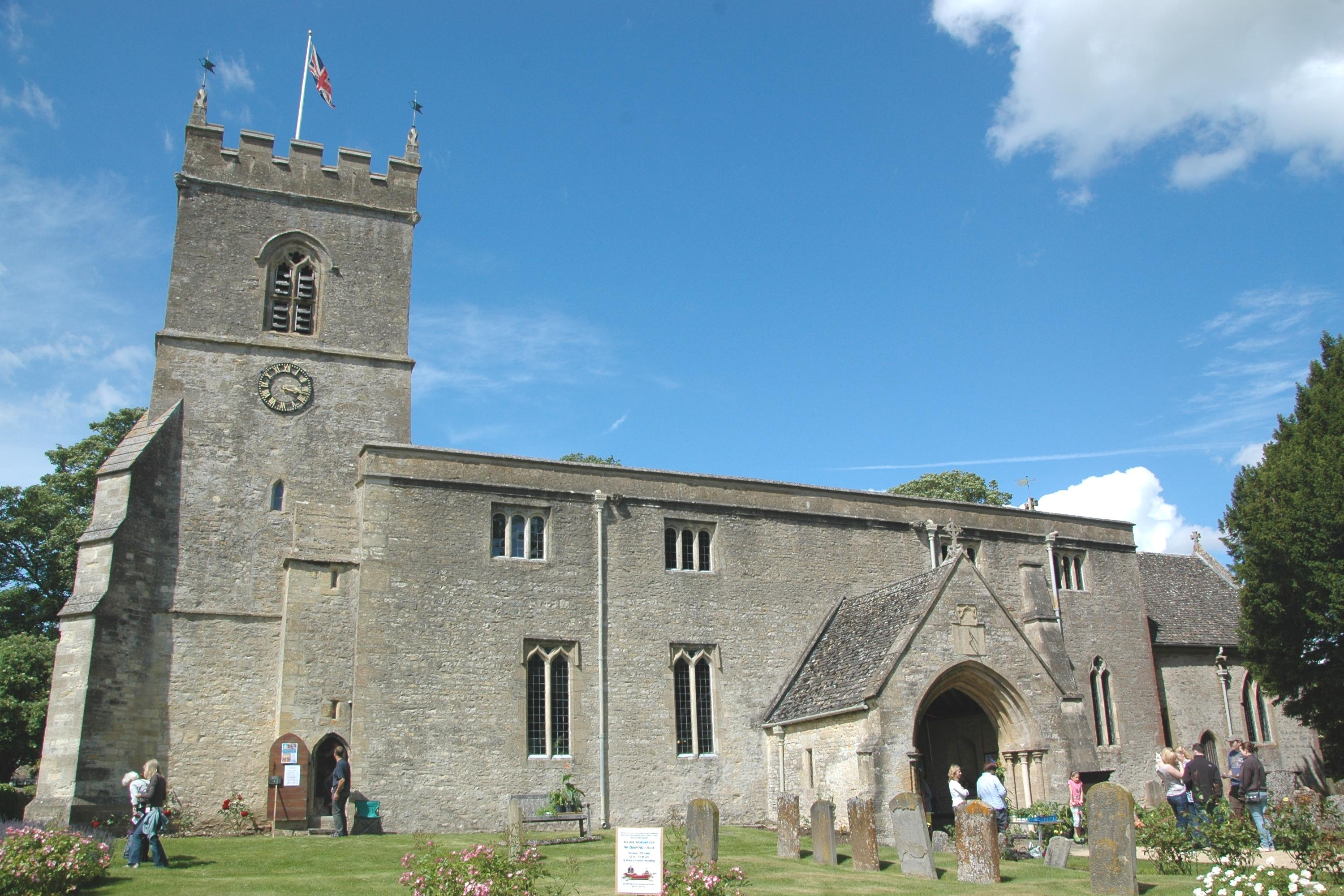
- St. Mary's parish church

- Location within Oxfordshire
- Interactive map showing the parish boundary
- Population: 602 (2021 census)
- OS grid reference: SP4319
- Civil parish: Wootton
- District: West Oxfordshire
- Shire county: Oxfordshire
- Region: South East
- Country: England
- Sovereign state: United Kingdom
- Post town: Woodstock
- Postcode district: OX20
- Dialling code: 01993
- Police: Thames Valley
- Fire: Oxfordshire
- Ambulance: South Central
- UK Parliament: Bicester and Woodstock
- Website: Wootton by Woodstock

Wootton is a village and civil parish on the River Glyme about 2 miles (3 km) north of Woodstock in West Oxfordshire, England. The village is sometimes referred to as Wootton-by-Woodstock to distinguish it from Wootton, Vale of White Horse. (Note: Wootton, Vale of White Horse, was in Berkshire but was transferred to Oxfordshire in the 1974 local authority boundary changes.) The 2021 census recorded the parish's population as 602.

It is on the Akeman Street Roman road and Oxfordshire Way long-distance footpath.

== Toponymy ==
The name was recorded as Optone in the Domesday Book of 1086 A.D. The Survey of English Place-Names records it was Wudutune in 958, Optone in 1086, Wuttona in 1163 and Wotton c.1180.

== Geography ==
The parish is bounded to the west partly by the River Glyme, to the north partly by a stream that joins the River Dorn, to the south-east by the course of Akeman Street, a Roman road, to the south-west by the pale of Blenheim Great Park and on other sides by field boundaries. It includes two deserted medieval villages: Dornford on the River Dorn, and Hordley on the River Glyme just downstream of the confluence of the Dorn and Glyme.

== History ==
The Domesday Book of 1086 records Wootton as the court of the hundred of Wootton. At the time of the Hundred Rolls in 1279 Hordley was recorded as having 19 households and 150 acres (61 ha) of land. By the early part of the 16th century this had declined to only five (adult) residents. The Gregory family had converted most of the farmland from arable to pasture which would have done much to reduce the village population.

The house at Hordley Farm, about 2/5 mile (1 km) southeast of Wootton, was built for the Gregory family in about 1500. It is arranged around three and a half sides of a quadrangle, possibly following the plan of an earlier medieval house on the same site. The kitchen fireplace and two of the doorways have four-centred arches that date from about 1500, and the north wing has two square-headed windows from the later 16th century. The ground-floor rooms have some 17th-century panelling. In 1750 the house was remodelled and a gazebo was built in the garden.

In 1787 Charles Parrott, sometime vicar of Saham Toney in Norfolk, died leaving a bequest for a school to be founded and run in Wootton. Early in the 19th century further schools were added in Wootton, including one run by the rector. In 1836 a new building was completed to merge all education in the village into one school. The Rector, L.C. Lee, paid towards the cost of the site and gave capital and the income from several cottages to fund the new school. In 1942 it was reorganised as a junior school. It became Wootton-by-Woodstock Church of England Primary School, but the School closed in August 2023 as a result of falling pupil numbers.

Wootton had two public houses until 2008, when the King's Head closed.

== Demographics ==
At the 2021 census, Wootton had a population of 602 people in 270 households.

Census population of Wootton parish
Census	Population	Female	Male	Households	Source
2001	543	286	257	248	
2011	569	300	269	244	
2021	602	299	303	270	

== Parish church ==
The earliest parts of the Church of England parish church of Saint Mary are the nave, north aisle and lower part of the tower, all of which date from the first half of the 13th century, and the south porch, which is Early English. In the 14th century the chancel and chancel arch were rebuilt and most of the windows in the building were replaced, all in a Decorated Gothic style. The upper part of the bell tower was added in the 15th century and the clerestory was added to the nave in the 16th century, each in a Perpendicular Gothic style.

The tower has a ring of six bells. Edward Hemins of Bicester cast the third, fourth and fifth bells in 1732 and the tenor bell in 1739. Abel Rudhall of Gloucester cast the second bell in 1749 and Mears & Stainbank of the Whitechapel Bell Foundry cast the present treble bell in 1923. St. Mary's also has a Sanctus bell that Thomas Rudhall cast in 1778. The parish is now part of the benefice of Wootton with Glympton and Kiddington.

== Natural history ==
The parish includes Sheep's Banks, formerly known as Holly Bank, a Site of Special Scientific Interest.

There are two areas of lowland fens that are designated as "Priority Habitat Inventory" by Natural England. The largest of these is near the confluence of the River Glyme and River Dorn.

== Amenities ==
The village has one public house, the Killingworth Castle Inn, which was built in 1637. It is now a gastropub that has won a Michelin Bib Gourmand and two AA rosettes. Wootton also has a village store.

== Sources and further reading ==
- James, Alan G. (2019). The Brittonic Language in the Old North, A Guide to the Place-Name Evidence, Volume 2 (PDF). Scottish Place-Name Society.
- Crossley, Alan; Baggs, A. P.; Colvin, Christina; Colvin, H. M.; Cooper, Janet; Day, C. J.; Selwyn, Nesta; Tomkinson, A. (1983). A History of the County of Oxford. Victoria County History. Vol. 11: Wootton Hundred (northern part). London: Oxford University Press for the Institute of Historical Research. pp. 259–285. ISBN 978-0-19722-758-9.
- Emery, Frank (1974). The Oxfordshire Landscape. The Making of the English Landscape. London: Hodder & Stoughton. pp. 54, 56, 120, 121, 220. ISBN 0-340-04301-6.
- Ponsonby, Charles (1968). Wootton: The Anatomy of an Oxfordshire Village, 1945–1968. Woodstock: privately published.
- Sherwood, Jennifer; Pevsner, Nikolaus (1974). Oxfordshire. The Buildings of England. Harmondsworth: Penguin Books. pp. 859–860. ISBN 0-14-071045-0.
- Atkinson, John Christopher (1868). A Glossary of the Cleveland Dialect (1st ed.). London, J.R. Smith.
