= Nether Worton =

Hamlet in Oxfordshire, England

Coordinates: 51.960°N 1.380°W

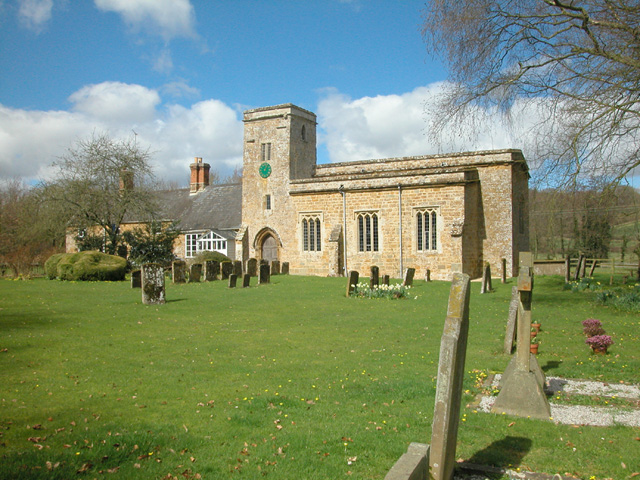
- St James' parish church (right) and former parish school (left)

- Location within Oxfordshire
- OS grid reference: SP4230
- Civil parish: Worton
- District: West Oxfordshire
- Shire county: Oxfordshire
- Region: South East
- Country: England
- Sovereign state: United Kingdom
- Post town: Chipping Norton
- Postcode district: OX7
- Dialling code: 01608
- Police: Thames Valley
- Fire: Oxfordshire
- Ambulance: South Central
- UK Parliament: Witney

Nether Worton is a hamlet in the civil parish of Worton, in the West Oxfordshire district, in the county of Oxfordshire, England. It is about 6 1/2 miles (10.5 km) south of Banbury and 7 miles (11 km) east of Chipping Norton. In 1931 the parish had a population of 42. On 1 April 1932 the parish was abolished and merged with Over Worton to form "Worton".

== Archaeology ==
Earthworks on Hawk Hill indicate a prehistoric settlement of unknown date, possibly Iron Age.

== Manor ==
The Domesday Book records that until 1066 one Leofgeat held the manor of Ortune, probably at what is now Nether Worton. After the Norman Conquest of England an estate of three hides and half a yardland at Worton passed to William the Conqueror's half-brother Odo of Bayeux. By 1086 there were 15 households consisting of 10 smallholders and five villagers.

Nether Worton House is the former manor house. It has a datestone inscribed 1653 but parts of the house may be earlier. The house was extended about 1920. It is a Grade II* listed building. The principal landowners in Nether Worton at the time were the Draper family. The best known of the family was William Draper (1620–1672), a figure of some importance on Parliament's side during the English Civil War and the Interregnum. The author Francis Osborne, best remembered for his Advice to a Son, who was William Draper's brother-in-law, died at Nether Worton House in 1659.

== Chapel of ease ==
The earliest parts of the Church of England chapel of ease of St James are 12th-century Norman and 13th-century Early English.The nave is aisled with three-bay north and south arcades. The piers of the south arcade are 12th-century but the columns are 14th-century. The north arcade is entirely 14th-century. The present southwest tower was built in 1630, incorporating a repositioned 13th-century doorway on the south side. The building was restored in 1883. The tower has two bells, the older of which was cast in 1601.

Until 2015 St James was part of a single benefice with Holy Trinity parish church, Over Worton. In March 2015 Nether Worton and Over Worton parishes became part of the Benefice of Westcote Barton with Steeple Barton, Duns Tew and Sandford St. Martin and Over with Nether Worton, also called the Barton Benefice.

== Sources ==
- Crossley, Alan (ed.); Baggs, A.P.; Colvin, Christina; Colvin, H.M.; Cooper, Janet; Day, C.J.; Selwyn, Nesta; Tomkinson, A. (1983). A History of the County of Oxford. Victoria County History. Vol. 11: Wootton Hundred (northern part). London: Oxford University Press for the Institute of Historical Research. pp. 285–293. ISBN 978-0-19722-758-9.
- Sherwood, Jennifer; Pevsner, Nikolaus (1974). Oxfordshire. The Buildings of England. Harmondsworth: Penguin Books. pp. 713–714. ISBN 0-14-071045-0.
