= Little Tew Meadows =

Protected area in Oxfordshire, England

- Site of Special Scientific Interest
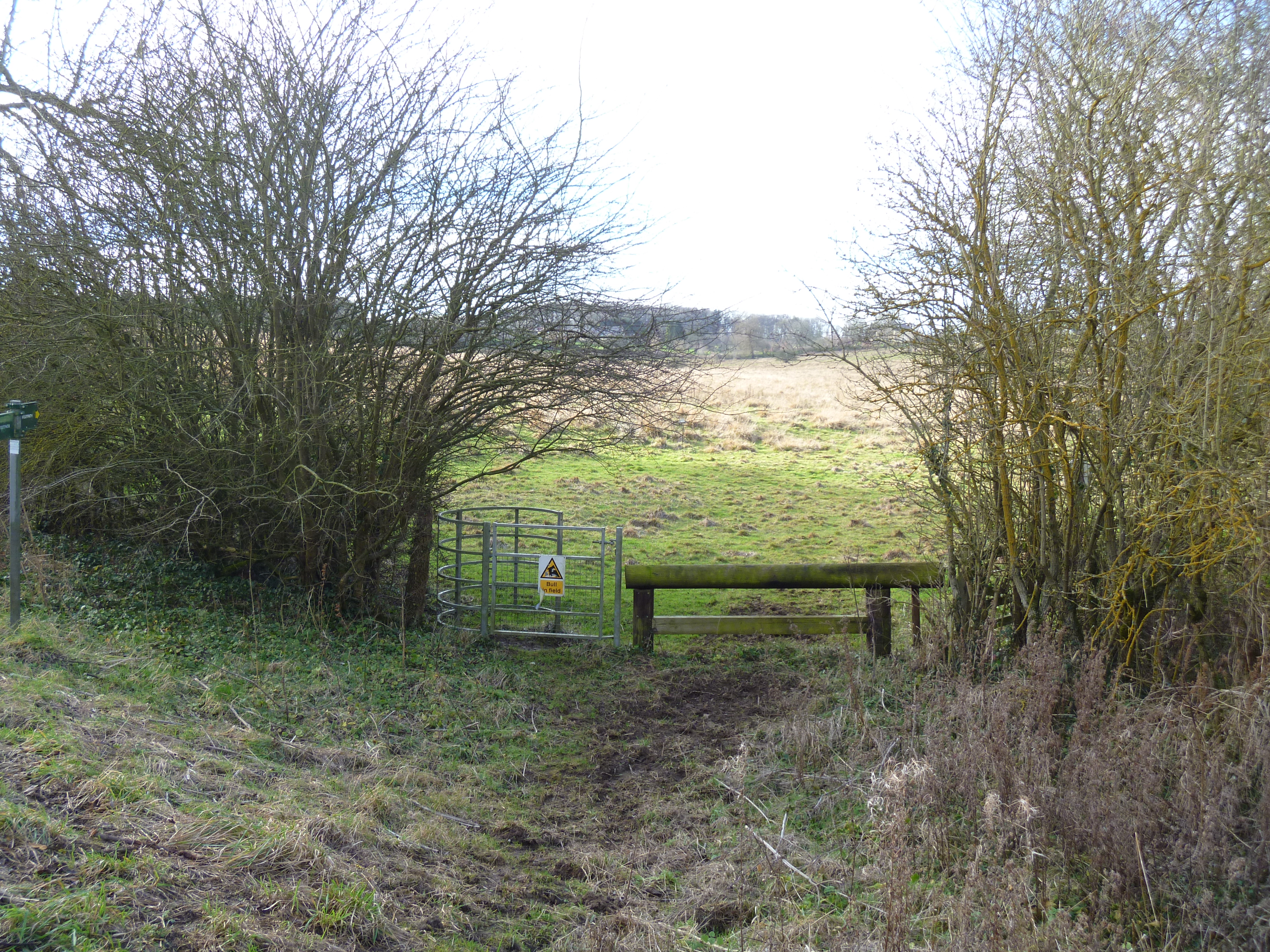
- Location of Little Tew Meadows.
- Area of search: Oxfordshire
- Grid reference: SP 377 281
- Interest: Biological 51.950°N 1.453°W
- Area: 40.0 hectares (99 acres)
- Notification date: 1995
- Location map: Magic Map

Little Tew Meadows is a 40-hectare (99-acre) biological Site of Special Scientific Interest east of Chipping Norton in Oxfordshire, England.

This site is composed of four adjoining unimproved meadows. One is used for hay while the rest are managed by cattle grazing. Two have prominent ridge and furrow dating to medieval farming practices. There are also extensive flushes and outcrops of limestone around the site of a former quarry.

== See also ==
- Little Tew
