= Westcott Barton =

Village in Oxfordshire, England

Coordinates: 51.927°N 1.379°W

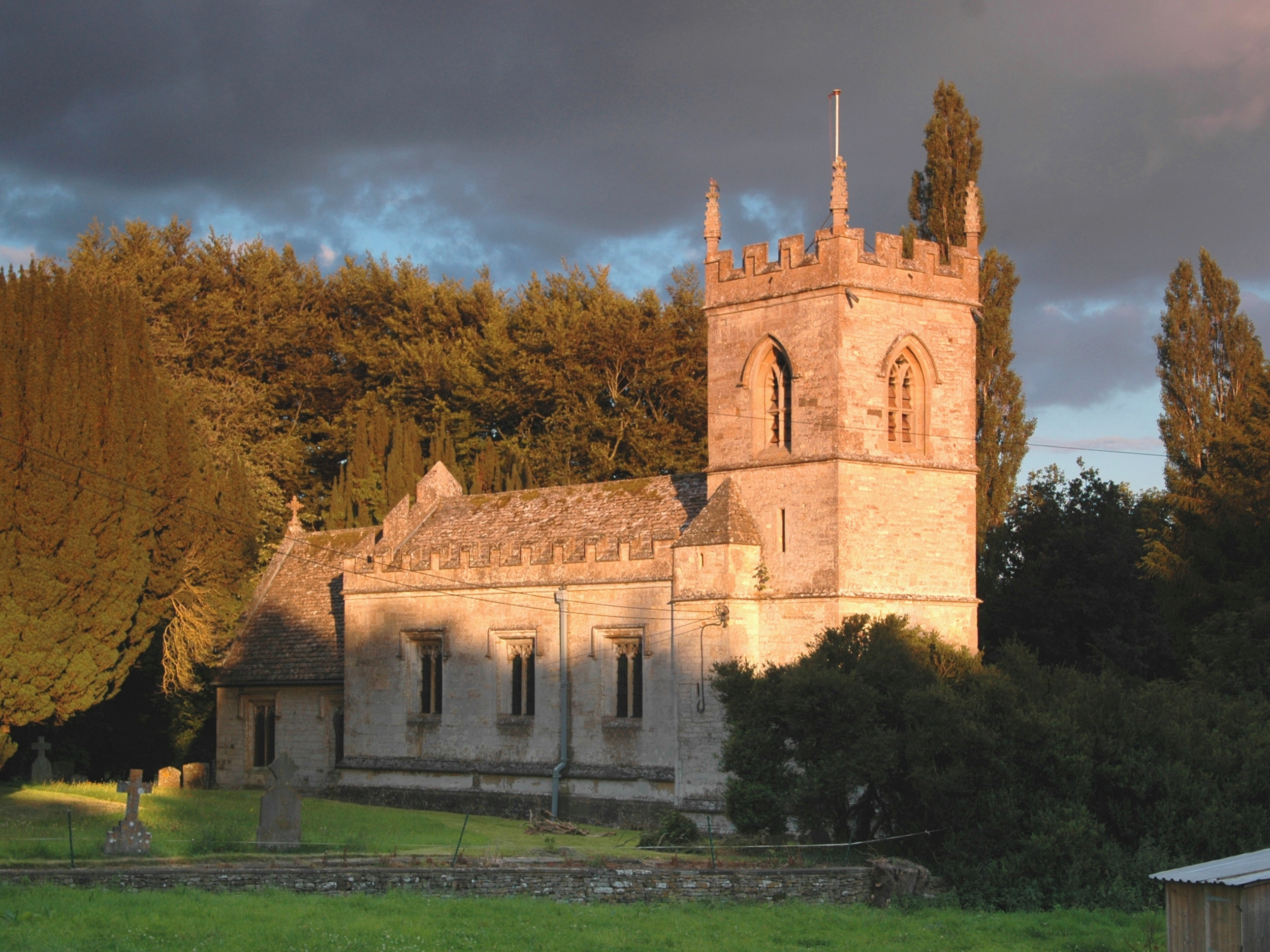
- St Edward the Confessor parish church

- Location within Oxfordshire
- Population: 244 (2011 census)
- OS grid reference: SP 428 256
- Civil parish: Westcot Barton
- District: West Oxfordshire
- Shire county: Oxfordshire
- Region: South East
- Country: England
- Sovereign state: United Kingdom
- Post town: Chipping Norton
- Postcode district: OX7
- Dialling code: 01869
- Police: Thames Valley
- Fire: Oxfordshire
- Ambulance: South Central
- UK Parliament: Banbury

Westcott Barton, also spelt Wescot Barton or Wescote Barton, is a village and civil parish on the River Dorn in West Oxfordshire about 7 miles (11 km) east of Chipping Norton and about 9 1/2 miles (15 km) south of Banbury, in the county of Oxfordshire, England. The parish is bounded to the north by Cockley Brook, a tributary of the River Dorn. A minor road to Kiddington forms part of the eastern boundary, another minor road forms part of the western boundary and the remainder of the parish boundaries are field boundaries. Westcott Barton's main area of housing is on the eastern boundary of the parish and contiguous with the village of Middle Barton in the neighbouring parish of Steeple Barton. The 2011 census recorded the parish's population as 244.

== Manor ==
As its toponym implies, Westcott Barton developed as a secondary settlement of the original village of Barton, which is now called Steeple Barton. By the time of the Norman Conquest of England it had its own manor and parish church, but it remained the smaller and less populous parish and as a result in the Middle Ages it was occasionally called Little Barton. Before the Norman conquest of England, Leofwine of Barton held the manor of Westcott Barton along with those of Dunthrop, Duns Tew and Little Tew.

The Domesday Book records that by 1086 Gilbert de Magminot, Bishop of Lisieux held Westcott Manor. It remained in his family until early in the 12th century when Gilbert's grand-niece Alice Maminot was married to Ralph de Keynes. The manor remained with the same family until at least 1279, when Robert de Keynes held Westcott Barton along with the manor of Tarrant Keyneston in Dorset. Thereafter the record of the overlordship of Westcott Barton is largely missing. In 1483 the Crown held it as part of the earldom of Hereford, whose succession had been disputed since 1373. Early in the 17th century it was part of the Duchy of Lancaster, again via the earldom of Hereford. In 1638 Westcott Barton manor was assessed at 12 yardlands.

== Parish church ==
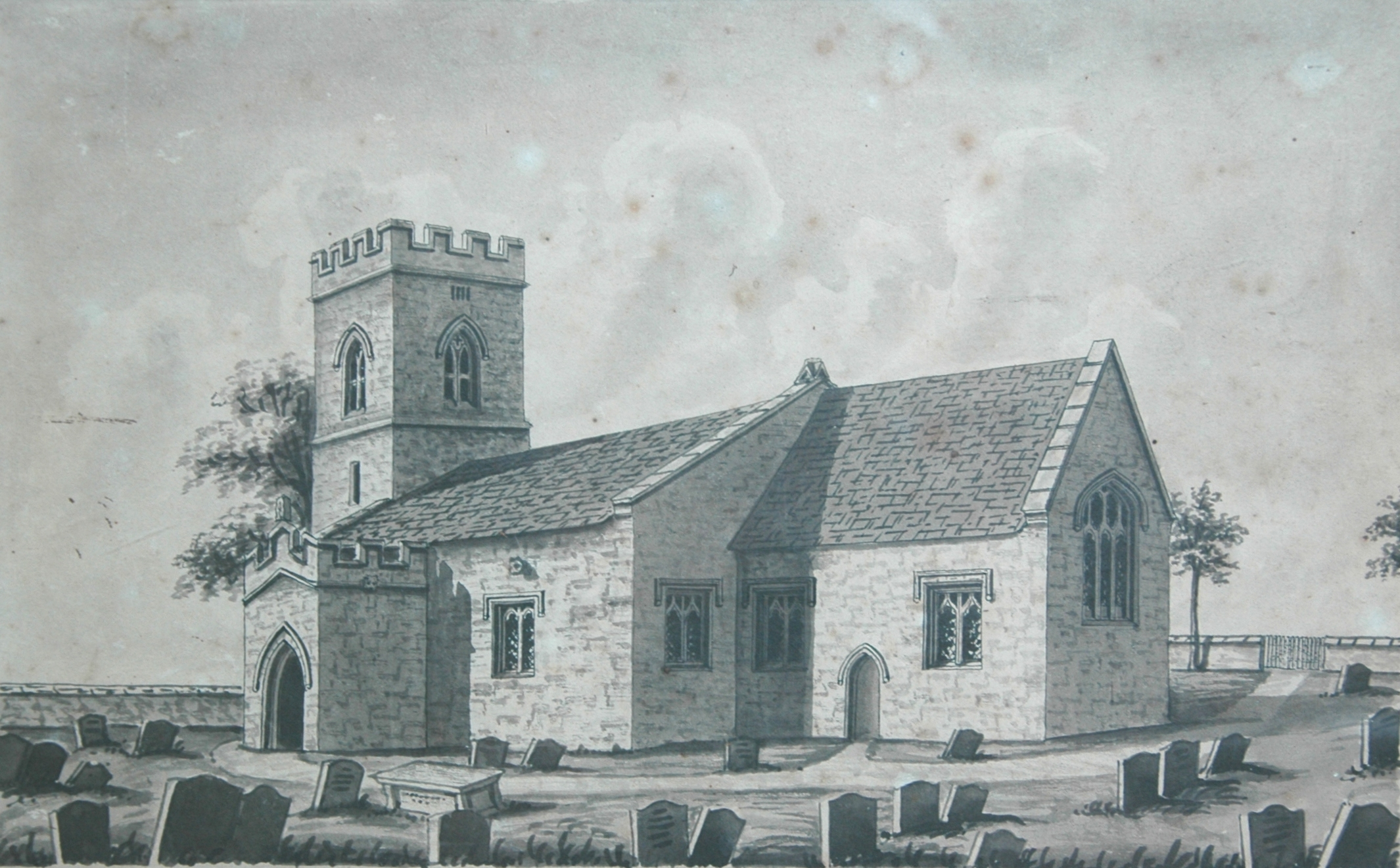
St Edward's parish church in 1852, a few years before G.E. Street's restoration and alterations

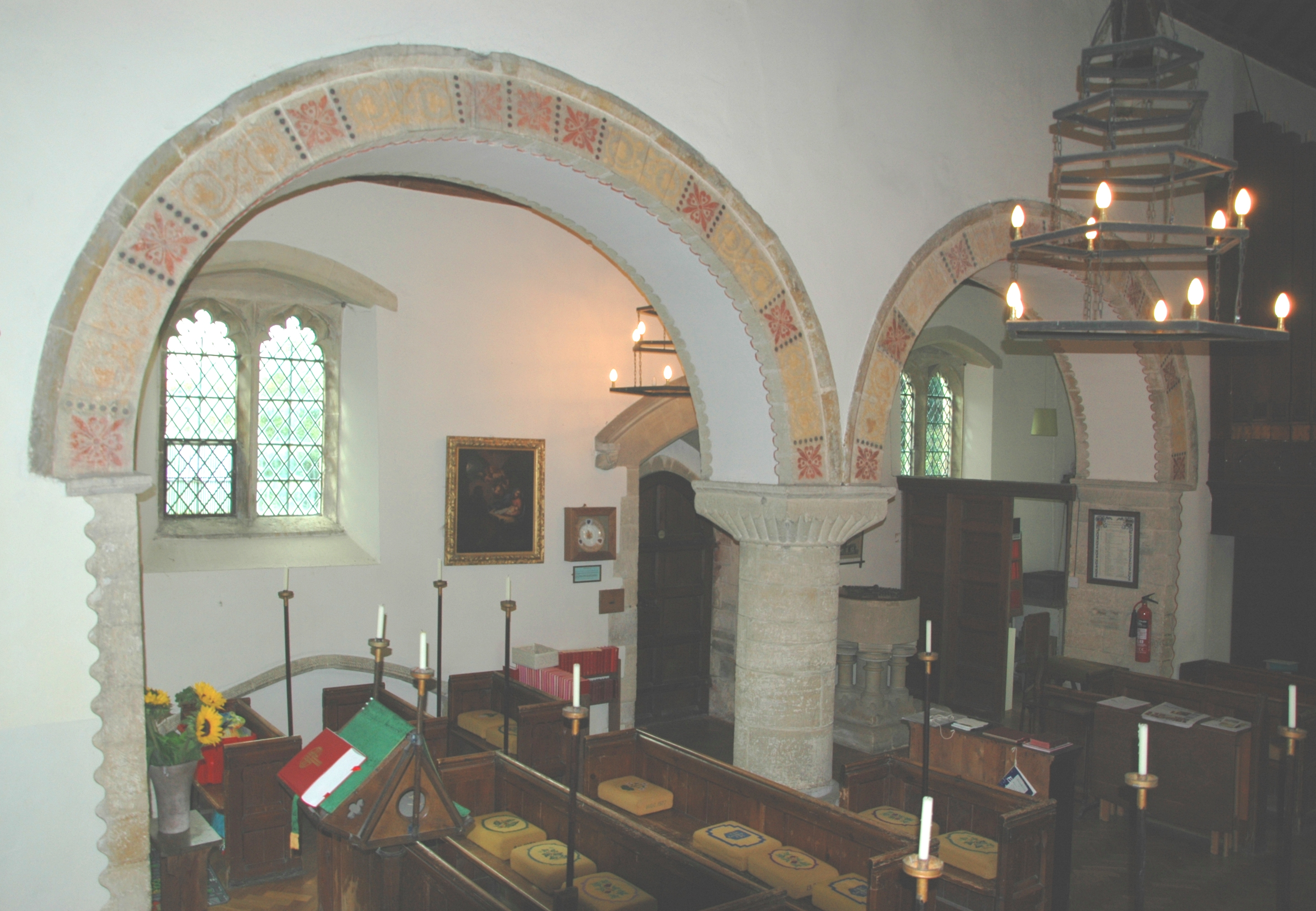
St Edward's parish church: 12th-century Norman south arcade

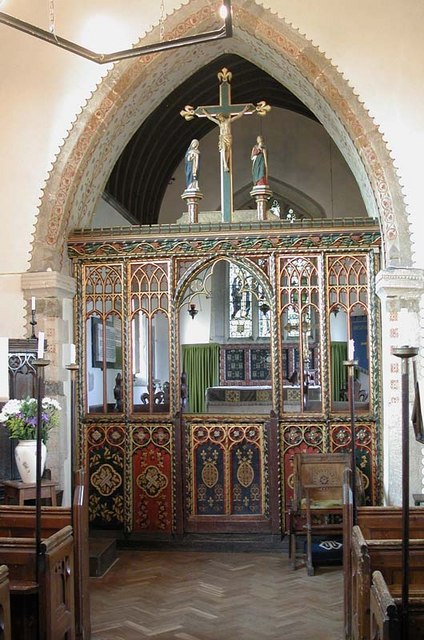
St Edward's parish church: 12th-century chancel arch, 15th-century screen and 19th-century rood cross

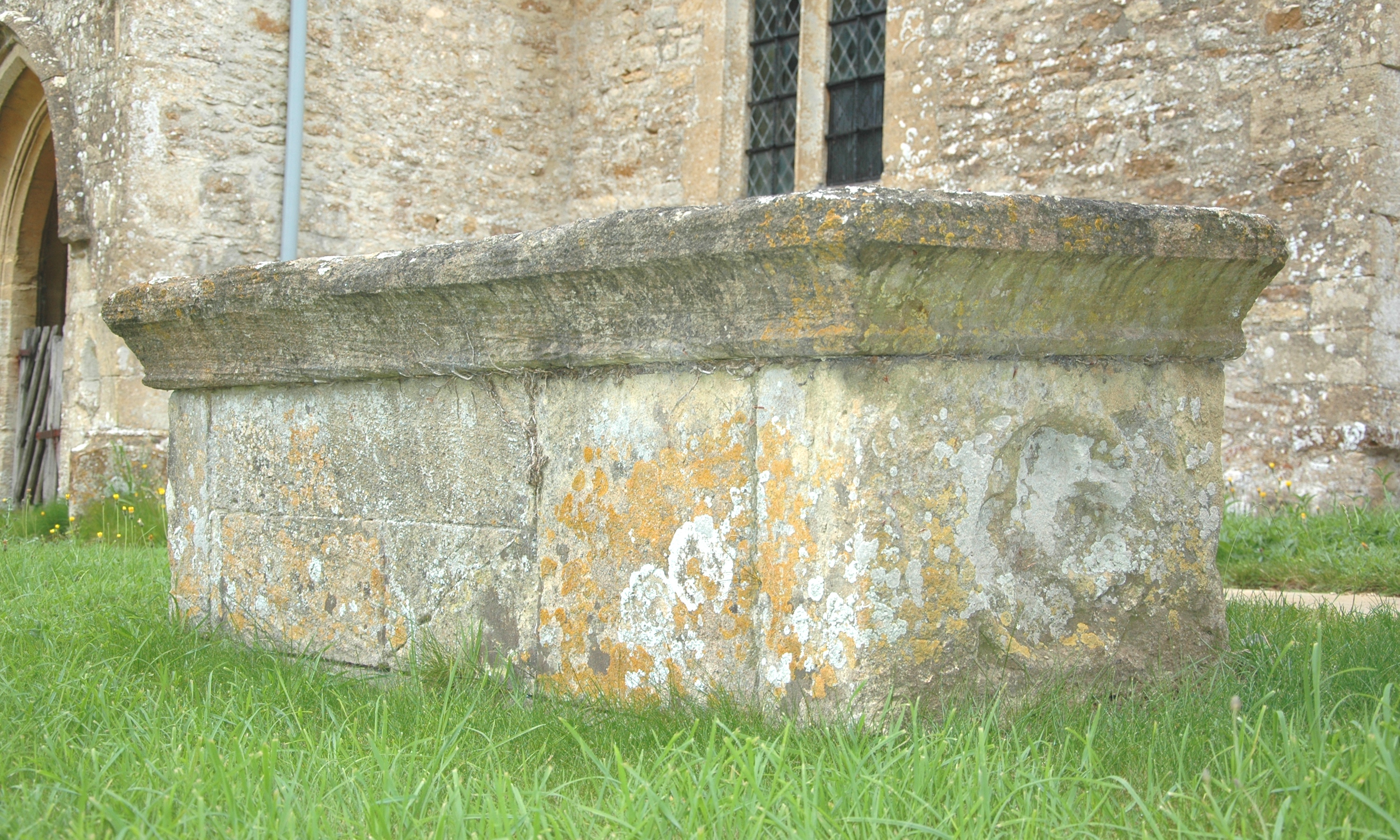
St Edward's parish churchyard: 15th-century tomb chest

There is archaeological evidence that by at least the 11th century there was an Anglo-Saxon stone church at Westcott Barton, which was originally dedicated to St Edmund the Martyr. In the 11th century the nave was extended westwards and in about the middle of the 12th century the south aisle was added. It has a two-bay arcade and a tomb recess, both of which are Norman. The chancel arch is in a transitional style from Norman to Early English. The church's dedication was changed from St Edmund to St Edward the Confessor in 1238. In the 14th and 15th centuries the chancel and north wall of the nave were rebuilt, the west tower and battlemented south porch were built and the wooden rood screen was installed, all in Perpendicular Gothic style. However, in about 1520 the chancel was reported to be in ruins.

A west gallery was installed, presumably in the 18th century. In 1855–56 the gallery was removed and the church was restored under the direction of the Oxford Diocesan Architect G.E. Street, who also added the battlements to the nave parapet. The then Vicar, Rev. E.L. Lockyer, painted the screen and the decorated patterns on the chancel and aisle arches. The current rood cross is a 19th-century Gothic Revival addition. St. Edward's is a Grade II* listed building. In the churchyard just south of the church are a 15th-century tomb chest that has a quatrefoil at either end, and the base and steps of a late medieval stone cross. The tower has three bells, which are notable for being moved by half-wheels. The second bell was cast by John Mitchell of Wokingham in about 1490. Mears and Stainbank of the Whitechapel Bell Foundry cast the tenor and treble bells in 1904. St Edward's also has a Sanctus bell that was cast by an unknown founder in about 1699.

Between 1180 and 1189 Alexander of Barton gave the church to the Benedictine Eynsham Abbey. In 1538, in the dissolution of the monasteries, the Abbey surrendered all its property to the Crown, which in 1557 sold the advowson of Westcott Barton to a secular buyer. In 1960 the benefice was merged with that of Steeple Barton, and in 1977 this united benefice was combined with the parishes of Duns Tew and Sandford St. Martin. In March 2015 the benefice was merged with that of Over Worton and Nether Worton to form the Benefice of Westcote Barton with Steeple Barton, Duns Tew and Sandford St Martin and Over with Nether Worton, also called the Barton Benefice.

== Economic history ==
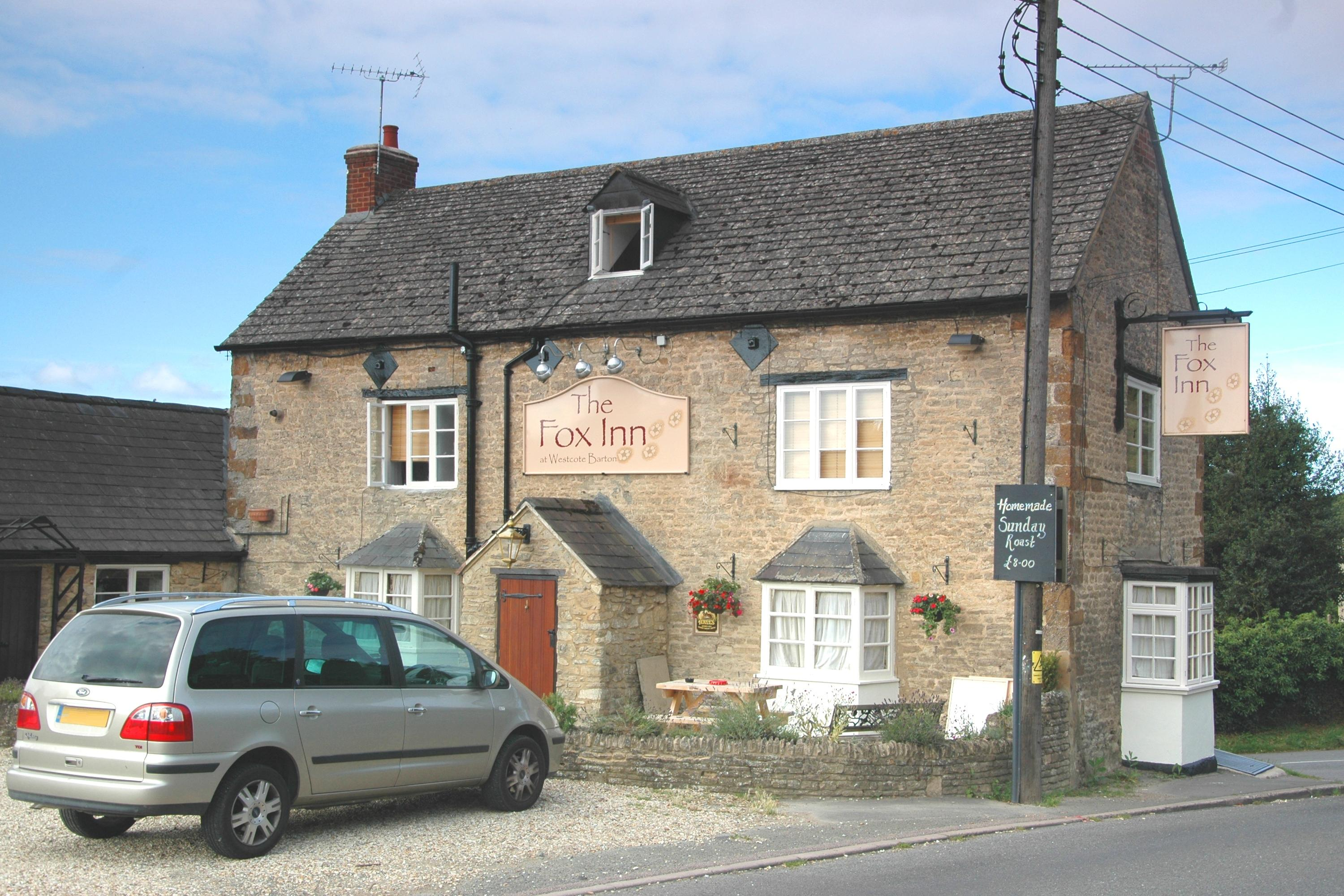
The Fox Inn public house

The village used to be clustered immediately around the parish church. Earthworks indicating the sites of buildings survive to the west, south and east of the churchyard. However, the modern village is 220 yards (200 m) east of the church, contiguous with Middle Barton village in the Steeple Barton parish. The agricultural lands of Steeple Barton and Westcott Barton were worked as a single field system. An open field system of farming prevailed in the two parishes until an inclosure act, the Westcott and Middle Barton Inclosure Act 1795 (35 Geo. 3. c. 19 Pr.), for their common lands, was implemented in 1796. The main road between Bicester and Enstone traverses the parish from east to west. It was turnpiked in 1793 but was disturnpiked in 1876 and is now classified the B4030 road.

== Amenities ==
Westcott Barton has an early 18th-century public house, the Fox Inn. The pub's website describes it as being in Middle Barton.

== Sources ==
- Anonymous (n.d.). The Parish Church of St Edward the Confessor Wescote Barton. Westcott Barton: (eight-page leaflet of history of church).
- Chambers, R.A. (1979). "Excavations at Westcote Barton Parish Church, 1977". Oxoniensia. XLIV. Oxfordshire Architectural and Historical Society: 99–101.
- Baggs, A.P.; Colvin, Christina; Colvin, H.M.; Cooper, Janet; Day, C.J.; Selwyn, Nesta; Tomkinson, A. (1983). Crossley, Alan (ed.). A History of the County of Oxford. Victoria County History. Vol. 11: Wootton Hundred (northern part). London: Oxford University Press for the Institute of Historical Research. pp. 75–81. ISBN 978-0-19722-758-9.
- Sherwood, Jennifer; Pevsner, Nikolaus (1974). Oxfordshire. The Buildings of England. Harmondsworth: Penguin Books. pp. 832–833. ISBN 0-14-071045-0.
