= Sheep's Banks =

Protected area in Oxfordshire, England

Coordinates: 51.885°N 1.359°W

- Site of Special Scientific Interest
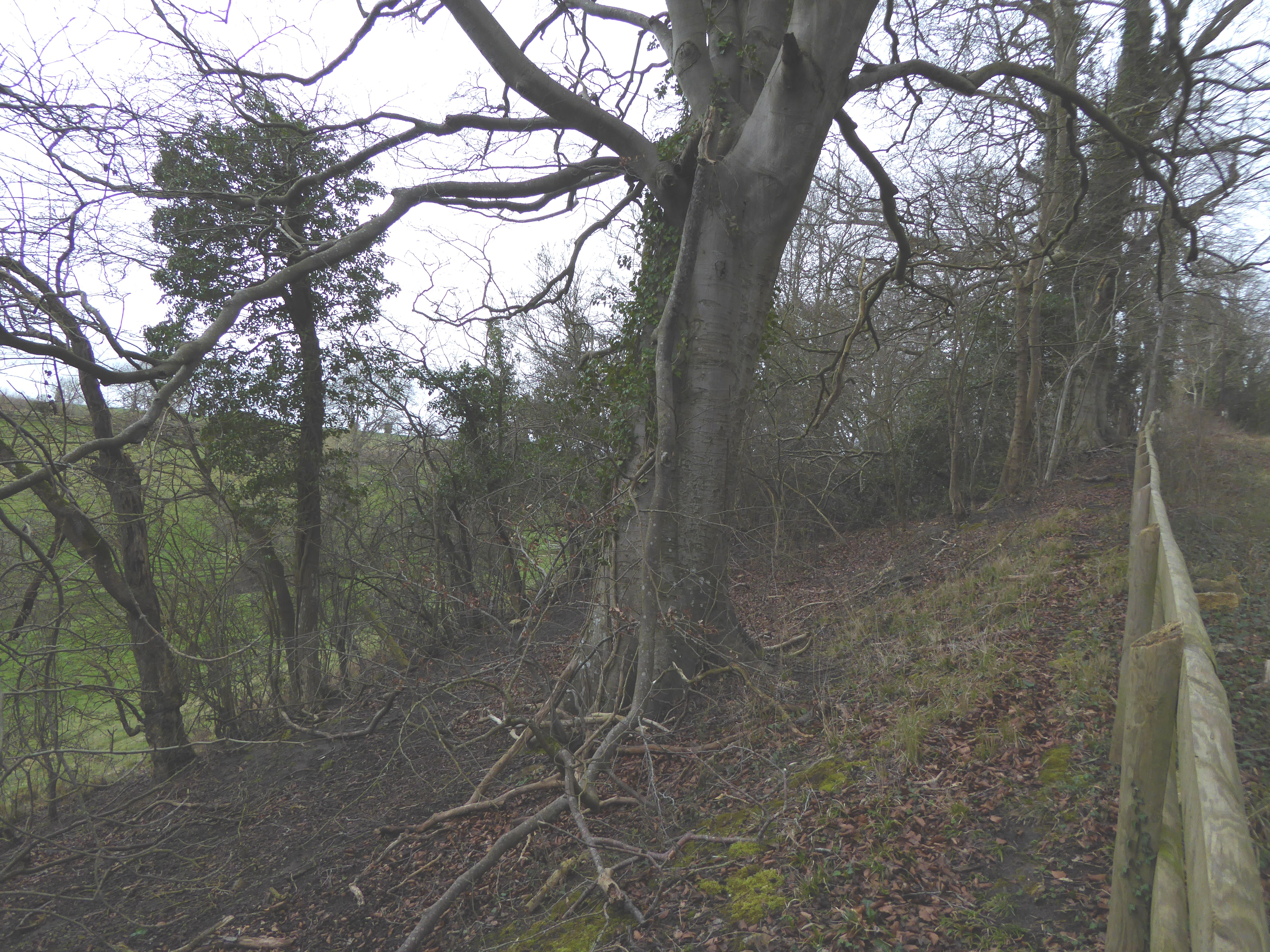
- Location of Sheep's Banks.
- Area of search: Oxfordshire
- Grid reference: SP 442 209
- Interest: Biological
- Area: 5.1 hectares (13 acres)
- Notification date: 1986
- Location map: Magic Map

Sheep's Banks is a 5.1-hectare (13-acre) biological Site of Special Scientific Interest north of Wootton in Oxfordshire.

This steeply sloping site is species-rich grassland which is traditionally managed. An ancient hedge runs the length of the site and a small stream runs along the downward side. Flora include five species of orchid, including bee, pyramidal and green-winged.

The site is private land with no public access.
