= Anne Greene =

English execution survivor (c. 1628 – 1659/1665)

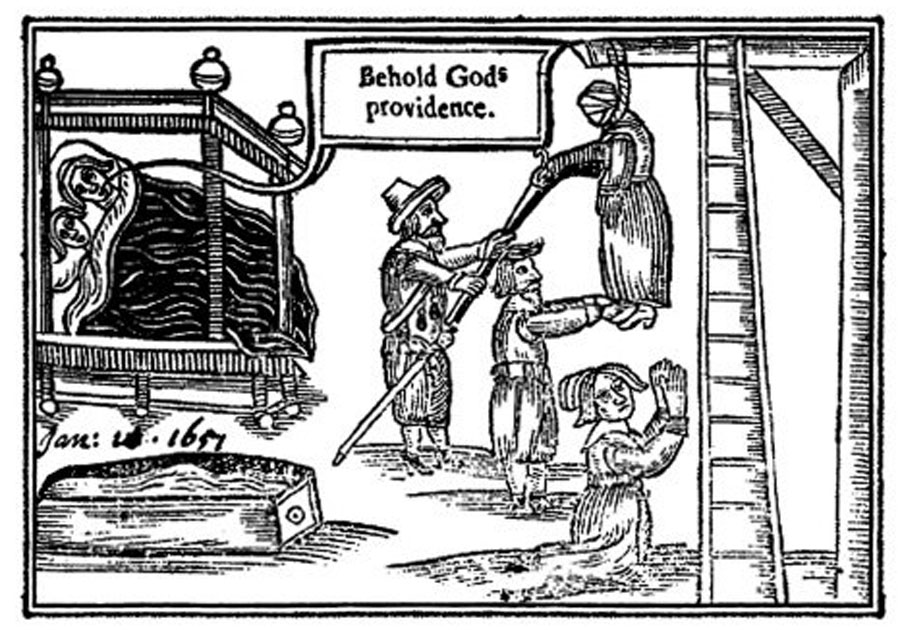
Woodcut from A Wonder of Wonders (1651) depicting the hanging of Anne Greene

Anne Greene (c. 1628 – 1659 or c. 1665) was an English domestic servant who was accused of committing infanticide in 1650. She is known for surviving her attempted execution by hanging, being revived by physicians from the University of Oxford.

== Early life ==
Greene was born around 1628 in Steeple Barton, Oxfordshire. In her early adulthood, she worked as a scullery maid in the house of Sir Thomas Reade, a justice of the peace who lived in nearby Duns Tew. She later claimed that in 1650 when she was a 22-year-old servant, she was seduced by Sir Thomas's grandson, Geoffrey Reade, who was 16 or 17 years old.

== Trial and punishment ==
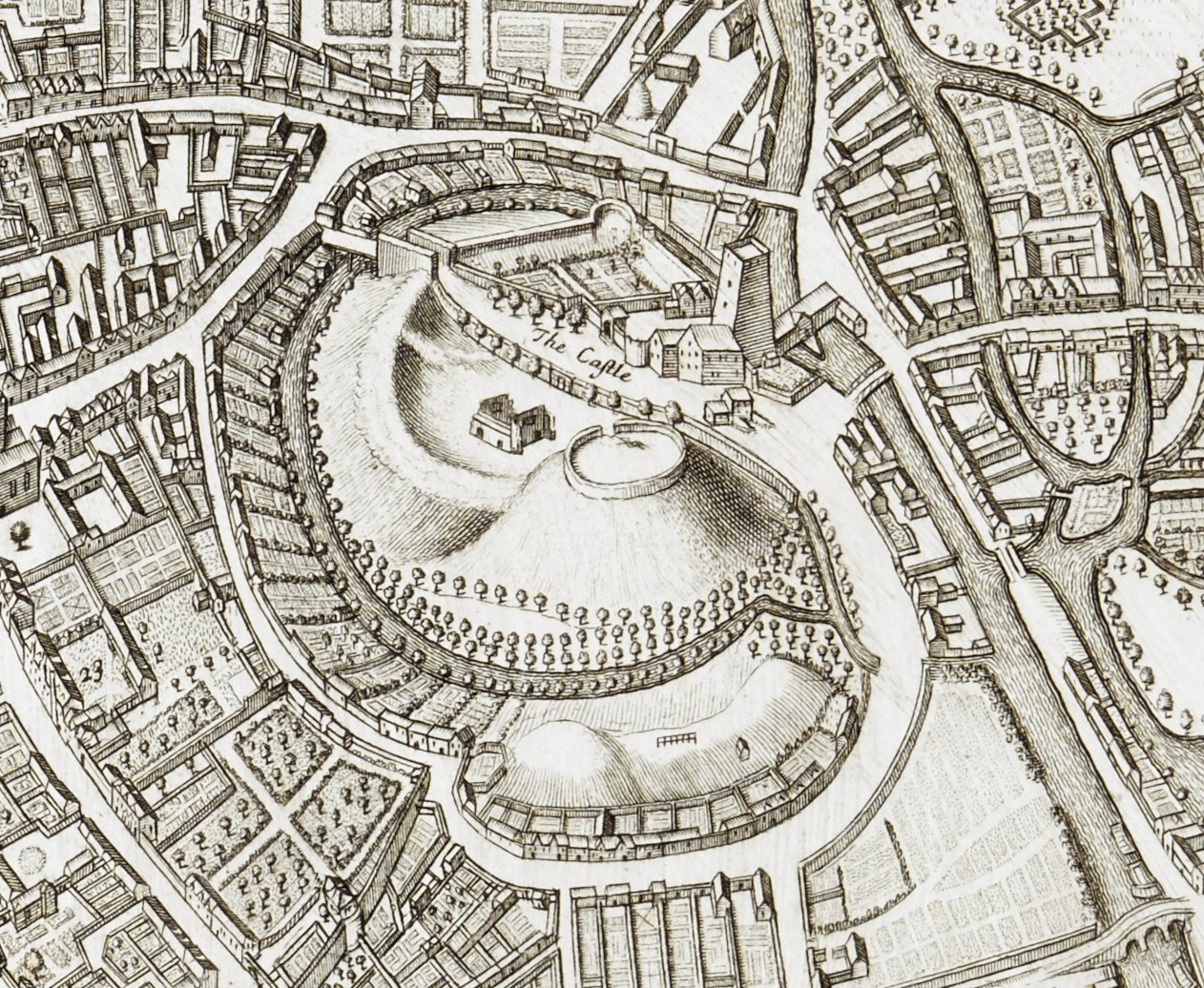
17th-century engraving of Oxford Castle, site of Anne Greene's hanging.

She became pregnant, though she later claimed that she was not aware of her pregnancy until she miscarried in the privy after seventeen weeks. She tried to conceal the remains of the fetus but was discovered and suspected of infanticide. Sir Thomas prosecuted Greene under the Concealment of Birth of Bastards Act 1624 (21 Jas. 1. c. 27), under which there was a legal presumption that a woman who concealed the death of her illegitimate child had murdered the child.

A midwife testified that the fetus was too underdeveloped to have ever been alive, and several servants who worked with Greene testified that she had experienced "issues" for approximately one month before her miscarriage, which began after she laboured turning malt. In spite of the testimony, Greene was found guilty of murder and was hanged at Oxford Castle on 14 December 1650. At her own request, several of her friends pulled her swinging body and a soldier struck her four or five times with the butt of his musket to expedite her death. She was presumed dead half an hour later, so she was cut down and given to University of Oxford physicians William Petty and Thomas Willis for dissection.

== Recovery ==
The physicians opened Greene's coffin on the morning of her hanging and discovered that she had a faint pulse and was weakly breathing. Petty and Willis sought the help of their Oxford colleagues Ralph Bathurst and Henry Clerke. The group of physicians tried many remedies to revive Greene, including pouring hot cordial down her throat, rubbing her limbs and extremities, bloodletting, applying a poultice to her breasts, and administering a tobacco smoke enema. The physicians then placed her in a warm bed with another woman, who rubbed her and kept her warm. Greene began to recover quickly, beginning to speak after twelve to fourteen hours of treatment and eating solid food after four days. Within one month she had fully recovered, aside from amnesia about the time surrounding her execution.

== Pardon and later life ==
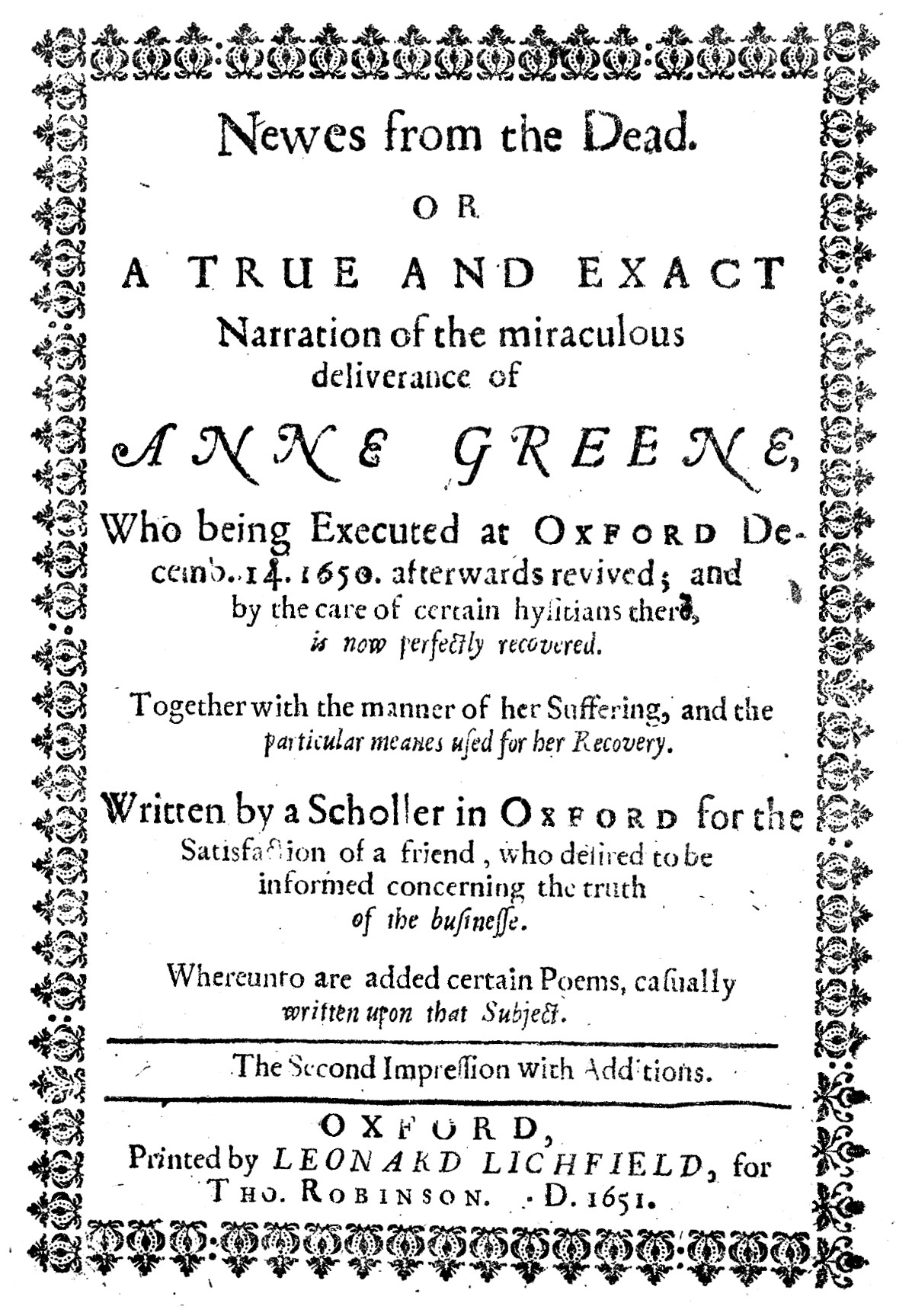
News from the Dead

The authorities granted Greene a reprieve from execution while she recovered and ultimately pardoned her, believing that the hand of God had saved her, demonstrating her innocence. Furthermore, one pamphleteer notes that Sir Thomas Reade died three days after Greene's hanging, so there was no prosecutor to object to the pardon. However, another pamphleteer writes that her recovery "moved some of her enemies to wrath and indignation, insomuch that a great man amongst the rest, moved to have her again carried to the place of execution, to be hanged up by the neck, contrary to all Law, reason and justice; but some honest Souldiers then present seemed to be very much discontent thereat" and intervened on Greene's behalf.

After her recovery, Greene went to stay with friends in the country, taking the coffin with her. She married and had three children. Robert Plot's 1677 The Natural History of Oxfordshire claims that she died in 1659, while Petty claimed that Greene lived fifteen years after her hanging, dying c. 1665, according to a 1675 entry in John Evelyn's Diary.

== Cultural significance ==
The event inspired two 17th-century pamphlets. The first, by W. Burdet, was entitled A Wonder of Wonders (Oxford, 1651) in its first edition and A Declaration from Oxford, of Anne Greene in its second edition. Burdet's pamphlets portray the event in miraculous, metaphysical terms. In 1651, Richard Watkins also published a pamphlet containing a sober, medically accurate prose account of the event and poems inspired by it, entitled Newes from the Dead (Oxford: Leonard Lichfield, 1651). The poems, of which there were 25 in various languages, included a set of English verses by Christopher Wren, who was at that time a gentleman-commoner (a student who paid all fees in advance) of Wadham College.

Greene's story was also mentioned in the 1659 English edition of Denis Pétau's The History of the World and in Robert Plot's 1677 The Natural History of Oxfordshire.

== See also ==
- Rebecca Smith (infanticide), last British woman executed for the infanticide of her own child
