= Little Tew =

Village in Oxfordshire, England

Coordinates: 51.956°N 1.442°W

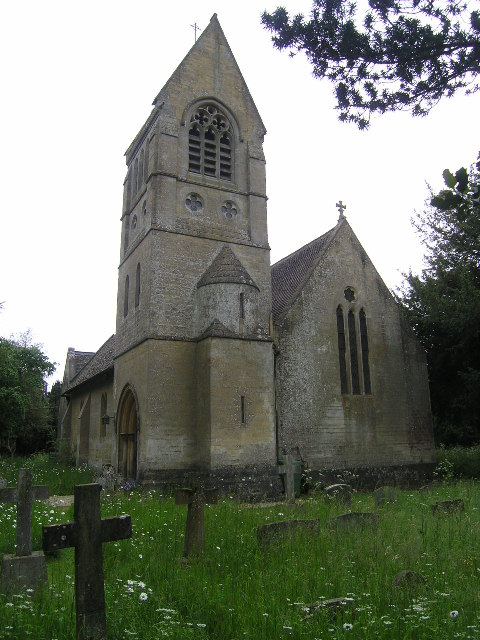
- St John the Evangelist parish church

- Location within Oxfordshire
- Population: 253 (2011 Census)
- OS grid reference: SP3828
- Civil parish: Little Tew
- District: West Oxfordshire
- Shire county: Oxfordshire
- Region: South East
- Country: England
- Sovereign state: United Kingdom
- Post town: Chipping Norton
- Postcode district: OX7
- Dialling code: 01608
- Police: Thames Valley
- Fire: Oxfordshire
- Ambulance: South Central
- UK Parliament: Banbury
- Website: littletew.org.uk

Little Tew is an English village and civil parish about 4 1/2 miles (7 km) northeast of Chipping Norton and 8 1/2 miles (14 km) southwest of Banbury in Oxfordshire. The parish is bounded to the northwest by the River Swere and a road between Little Tew and Hook Norton, to the north by a tributary of the River Cherwell and to the south by an ancient drovers' road called Green Lane. The remaining parts of the parish bounds are field boundaries. The 2011 Census recorded the parish's population as 253.

== Manor ==
Before the Norman conquest of England, Leofwine of Barton held the manor of Little Tew along with those of Dunthrop, Duns Tew and Westcott Barton. The Domesday Book records that in 1086 Odo, Bishop of Bayeux held Little Tew. The manor was divided between three tenants: Wadard and Humphrey each had three and a half hides and Ilbert de Lacy had two hides. On or before Odo's death in 1097, the tenants succeeded Odo as tenants-in-chief, thus dividing Little Tew into three separate manors. Wadard's lands were the beginnings of the barony of Arsic. In 1103, Manasser Arsic founded a priory of the Benedictine Abbey of Fécamp at Cogges and gave the priory an endowment including the Wadard manor at Little Tew. In 1441 Henry VI seized the priory and its estates and gave them to Eton College, which sold most of its land at Little Tew in 1921.

In 1206, Osney Abbey acquired the Humphrey manor. In 1542, the Abbey was suppressed in the Dissolution of the Monasteries, but its manor at Little Tew was granted to the new Oxford Cathedral, which was Osney's former abbey church. However, in 1545 the seat of the Diocese of Oxford was transferred from the former Osney Abbey to the former St. Frideswide's Priory and the manor at Little Tew was returned to the Crown. In 1565 the Crown gave the manor to Sir William Petre, who in 1566 gave it to Exeter College, Oxford. The de Lacy manor at Little Tew became part of the Honour of Pontefract, in which it remained until Alice de Lacy died in 1348. By 1356 the manor was attached to the barony of Clifford Castle in Herefordshire.

== Church and chapel ==
There is a tradition that Little Tew had a medieval chapel before the English Reformation, but no physical or definite documentary evidence is known to prove this. When the parish's common lands were enclosed in 1794, 16 1/2 acres (6.7 ha) of land were set aside for an income to fund church services, but no church was built. The first report of Baptists in Little Tew is from 1771, and one villager registered his house as an Anabaptist meeting place in 1778.

In 1829 a Baptist missionary from Chipping Norton applied for a licence to convert a building in Little Tew into a chapel, and Baptist services in Little Tew attracted about 100 people from the surrounding area. Exeter College offered to build and endow an Anglican church for Little Tew "to prevent alienation of the inhabitants from the Established Church". The Vicar of Great Tew did not support the idea, but his successors held Anglican services in Little Tew, at first in a barn and later in the new village school that was built in 1836.

In 1845 the Baptists finally built a small chapel, and in 1853 the Church of England completed the chapel of Saint John the Evangelist, designed by the Gothic Revival architect G.E. Street in an early-14th-century style. It has a tower with a gabled roof and a chime of eight bells. St. John's was a chapel of ease of the parish of Great Tew until 1857, when Little Tew was made a separate ecclesiastical parish.

Little Tew Baptist Church has the distinction of hosting the first woman pastor in the Baptist Church, Edith Gates, in 1918.

Today St. John's is once again part of a single benefice with the parish of Great Tew.

Street also designed the vicarage, completed in the same year as St. John's chapel. The vicarage was altered and enlarged firstly by Charles Buckeridge in about 1869 and then by E.G. Bruton in 1880. The Baptist chapel was rebuilt in 1871, with a stepped gable and Perpendicular Gothic style windows. A schoolroom was added in 1925, but both it and the chapel were sold in 1968. The building is now in private use.

== Economic and social history ==
In the 13th century Little Tew had a windmill in South Field. It may have been on the same site as a windmill recorded near Lodge Farm in 1742, south of the village on the road to Church Enstone. The mill seems to have disappeared by 1767. The oldest building in the parish is the shell of a 14th-century house. It was extended in the 16th century and is now internally reordered as two cottages, but it retains its medieval screens passage. In 1767 the enclosure of common lands at Great Tew deprived Little Tew of some grazing land. Little Tew continued to farm under an open field system until an Act of Parliament enabled its lands to be enclosed in 1794.

A day school was founded in Little Tew in 1823. Exeter College supported it from 1830, and Eton College supported it from 1834. Exeter College also gave land on which a schoolhouse and master's house were built in 1836. In 1862–63 a new schoolhouse and master's house and set of three almshouses were built, all designed by Charles Buckeridge. The almshouses were never used as such but were sold for private use. The 1836 school building was converted into a house in 1867 and let to provide income for the school. In the 1900s the number of school pupils declined and in 1923 the school was closed. Little Tew had a post office from 1881 until about 1975. The Bell House was a public house but is now a private house. For forty years, until 2009, the Grange became home for an amateur theatre of high repute.

== See also ==
- Little Tew Meadows, an SSSI

== Sources and further reading ==
- Baggs, A.P.; Colvin, Christina; Colvin, H.M.; Cooper, Janet; Day, C.J.; Selwyn, Nesta; Tomkinson, A. (1983). Crossley, Alan (ed.). A History of the County of Oxford. Victoria County History. Vol. 11: Wootton Hundred (northern part). London: Oxford University Press for the Institute of Historical Research. pp. 247–258. ISBN 978-0-19722-758-9.
- Lattey, R.T. (1952–53). "Field Names of Enstone and Little Tew Parishes, Oxon". Oxoniensia. XVII–XVIII. Oxford: Oxford Architectural and Historical Society: 265–266.
- Lattey, R.T. (1956). "Field Names of Enstone and Little Tew Parishes, Oxon". Oxoniensia. XXI. Oxford: Oxford Architectural and Historical Society: 84.
- Sherwood, Jennifer; Pevsner, Nikolaus (1974). Oxfordshire. The Buildings of England. Harmondsworth: Penguin Books. pp. 690–691. ISBN 0-14-071045-0.
