= Worton (civil parish), Oxfordshire =

English civil parish

Coordinates: 51.959°N 1.378°W

Worton
- Civil parish
- Location within Oxfordshire
- Population: 624
- Civil parish: Worton
- District: West Oxfordshire
- Shire county: Oxfordshire
- Region: South East
- Country: England
- Sovereign state: United Kingdom
- Post town: Chipping Norton
- Postcode district: OX7
- Dialling code: 01608
- Police: Thames Valley
- Fire: Oxfordshire
- Ambulance: South Central
- UK Parliament: Banbury

Worton is a civil parish in the West Oxfordshire district about 7 miles (11 km) south of Banbury, England. It was formed in 1932 by the merger of the parishes of Nether Worton and Over Worton, each of which is a small village. The main road between Deddington and Swerford is the parish's northern boundary. It was a turnpike road and is now the B4031. From there the parish extends 4 miles (6.4 km) to Worton Wood on its southern boundary. East–west the parish is nowhere more than 1 3/4 miles (3 km) wide. The 2011 Census recorded the population of Worton parish as 624.
