= Sandford St Martin =

Village in Oxfordshire, England

Coordinates: 51.939°N 01.390°W

Sandford St. Martin
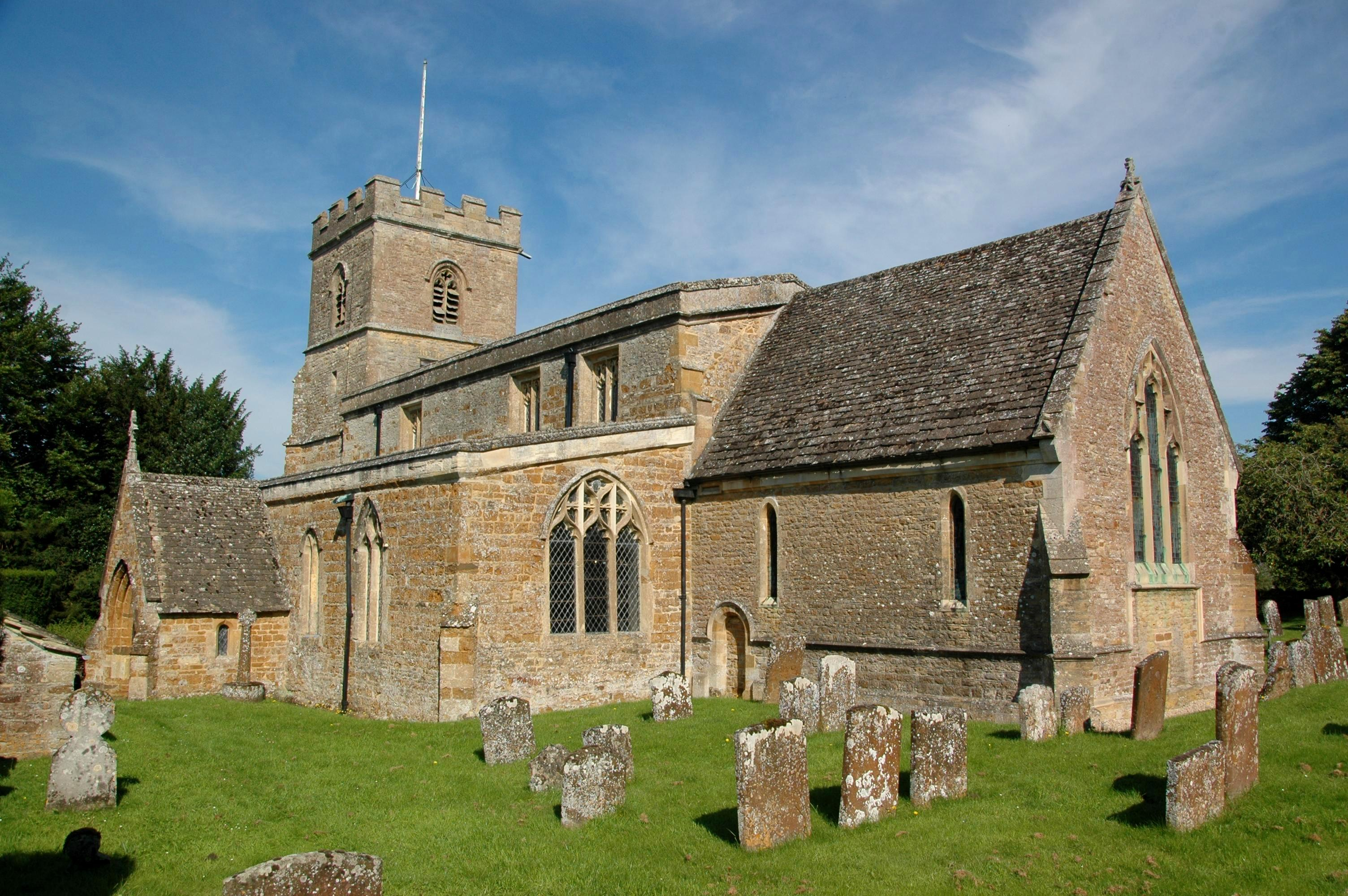
- St Martin's parish church

- Location within Oxfordshire
- Population: 209 (2011 Census)
- OS grid reference: SP4226
- Civil parish: Sandford St. Martin
- District: West Oxfordshire
- Shire county: Oxfordshire
- Region: South East
- Country: England
- Sovereign state: United Kingdom
- Post town: Chipping Norton
- Postcode district: OX7
- Dialling code: 01608
- Police: Thames Valley
- Fire: Oxfordshire
- Ambulance: South Central
- UK Parliament: Banbury
- Website: Sandford St Martin & Ledwell

Sandford St Martin is a village and civil parish in West Oxfordshire about 7 miles (11 km) east of Chipping Norton and about 12 miles (19 km) south of Banbury. The 2011 Census recorded the parish's population as 209.

== Geography ==
The parish measures about 4 miles (6 km) north–south, just over 1 mile (1.6 km) wide east–west at its widest point, and covers an area of 2,292 acres (928 ha). It northern boundary is the B4031 road linking Swerford Heath and Deddington. It is bounded in the south by a field boundary just south of the B4030 road linking Enstone and Westcott Barton. Streams form parts of the eastern boundary. The remainder of the parish is bounded by field boundaries.

About 1 mile (1.6 km) north of the village is the hamlet of Ledwell, which is on Cockley Brook. In the north of the parish is Grove Ash, which is the site of a deserted Medieval village that used to be a separate township.

The highest point in the parish is Sandford Belt, which is on the western boundary of the parish about 1/2 mile (800 m) west of Ledwell and about 590 feet (180 m) above sea level. Sandford St Martin village is in the south of the parish around a former ford across Tyte brook, a tributary of the River Dorn.

== History ==
The village was called Sandford until about 1884, when the suffix "St Martin" was added to distinguish it from Sandford-on-Thames elsewhere in Oxfordshire and Dry Sandford in what was then the neighbouring part of Berkshire. The centre of the village is a small triangular green, on which is a stone cross. The base is Medieval. The shaft probably dates from a restoration in 1856 by the Gothic Revival architect GE Street. The head is 20th-century. Sandford's current manor house was built about 1715, but it may include parts of an earlier house.

Opposite the parish church is Sandford Park, which was built about 1700 and has a later 18th-century west wing. A north wing was added in the early 20th century and demolished in 1954. The house is a Grade II* listed building. In the 18th and 19th centuries there was a pub in Sandford near the Manor House. In 1774 it was licensed as the Silver Tavern. It was briefly renamed the Taylor's Arms, and from 1788 was called the Crown. It ceased trading early in the 1880s and was converted to a residential property, allegedly because Edward Marshall, then occupant of the Manor House, objected to it being so near his home.

== Parish church ==
The Church of St Martin, from which the village takes its name, is a Church of England parish church serving both Sandford St Martin and the neighbouring hamlet of Ledwell. It has been part of the Barton Benefice of five parishes and six churches since 1975. The church is dedicated to Saint Martin of Tours.

A Grade II* listed building recognised for its architectural and historic interest, earliest extant parts of the church date to the 12th century, with later medieval fabric in both Decorated Gothic and Perpendicular Gothic style. The church was restored in 1856 to the Gothic Revival designs of George Edmund Street, who had the chancel rebuilt.

== Notable people ==
- Henry Scott, 1st Earl of Deloraine KB and the Countess of Deloraine, who are buried at St Martin's parish church.

== Bibliography ==
- Anonymous (2012). John Piper and the Church a Stained-Glass Tour of Selected Local Churches. Dorchester-on-Thames: Friends of Dorchester Abbey.
- Crossley, Alan (ed.); Baggs, AP; Colvin, Christina; Colvin, HM; Cooper, Janet; Day, CJ; Selwyn, Nesta; Tomkinson, A (1983). "Sandford St. Martin". A History of the County of Oxford. Victoria County History. Vol. 11: Wootton Hundred (northern part). London: Oxford University Press for the Institute of Historical Research. pp. 169–181. ISBN 978-0-19722-758-9.
- Emery, Frank (1974). The Oxfordshire Landscape. The Making of the English Landscape. London: Hodder & Stoughton. pp. 173–176. ISBN 0-340-04301-6.
- Marshall, Edward (1866). An Account of the Parish of Sandford in the Deanery of Woodstock. James Parker and Co.
- Sherwood, Jennifer; Pevsner, Nikolaus (1974). Oxfordshire. The Buildings of England. Harmondsworth: Penguin Books. pp. 750–752. ISBN 0-14-071045-0.
