= Howard Colvin =

British architectural historian (1919–2007)

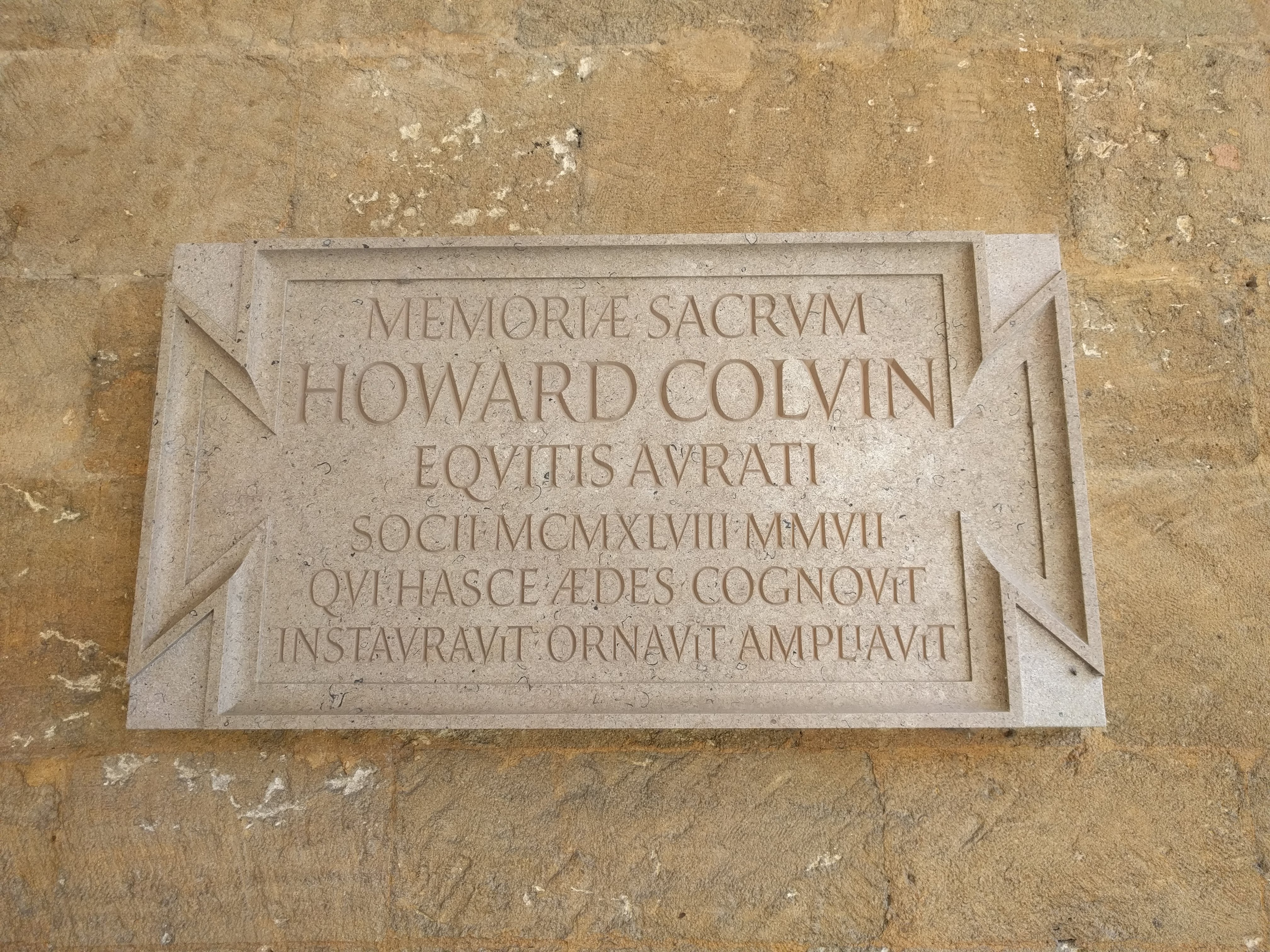
Memorial plaque, in Latin, at St John's College, Oxford

Sir Howard Montagu Colvin CVO CBE FBA FRHistS FSA (15 October 1919 – 27 December 2007) was a British architectural historian who produced two of the most significant works of scholarship in his field: A Biographical Dictionary of British Architects, 1600–1840 and The History of the King's Works.

== Life and works ==
Born in Sidcup, Colvin was educated at Trent College and University College London. In 1948, he became a Fellow of St John's College, Oxford, where he remained until his death in 2007.

He served on several bodies including the Royal Commission on the Historical Monuments of England (1963–76), the Historic Buildings Council for England (1970–84), and the Royal Fine Art Commission (1962–72).

His Biographical Dictionary of British Architects, 1600–1840 was first published in 1954. Yale University Press produced the third edition in 1995, and he had just completed work on the fourth edition at the time of his death. On publication it was hailed as groundbreaking; it "changed the face of English architectural history", according to historian David Watkin.

The dictionary only includes buildings where an architect’s name can be linked through documentary evidence, reflecting Colvin’s opposition to stylistic attributions. The prefatory essay, "The Practice of Architecture, 1600–1840", analysed both the building trades and the architectural profession, contributing to the wider social history of Britain.

He also served as general editor and contributor to the official multi-volume The History of the King's Works, published between 1963 and 1982.

Colvin also influenced policy: he chaired the committee of English Heritage responsible for Britain’s built environment, and in 1984 he led a campaign that persuaded Chancellor of the Exchequer Nigel Lawson to amend the Budget in order to save Calke Abbey for the nation.

== Honours ==
Colvin was knighted in 1995. He served as president of the Society of Architectural Historians of Great Britain from 1979 to 1981; in 1984, a special issue of its journal Architectural History was published in his honour.

== Personal life ==
Colvin married Christina Edgeworth Butler, a literary scholar and historian of Oxfordshire, in 1943; they had two sons. She predeceased him in 2003.

== Archive and library ==
Colvin's research papers and correspondence associated with the Dictionary of British Architects, 1600–1840 are held in the archives of the Paul Mellon Centre in London.

== Publications ==
=== The History of the King's Works ===
- London: HMSO (1963–1982)
  - Vol. 1–2: The Middle Ages, R. Allen Brown, H. M. Colvin, and A. J. Taylor ISBN 0-11-670571-X (also includes plans 1–4)
  - Vol. 3: 1485–1660, part 1, H.M. Colvin, D. R. Ransome, John Summerson ISBN 0-11-670568-X
  - Vol. 4: 1485–1660, part 2, H.M. Colvin, D. R. Ransome, John Summerson ISBN 0-11-670832-8
  - Vol. 5: 1660–1782, H.M. Colvin, J. Mordaunt Crook, Kerry Downes, John Newman ISBN 0-11-670571-X
  - Vol. 6: 1782–1851, J. Mordaunt Crook, M. H. Port ISBN 0-11-670286-9
  - Plans 5–7 ISBN 0-11-671116-7

=== Other works ===
- Ackermann's Oxford. London: [Penguin Books]. 1954.
- A History of Deddington, Oxfordshire. London: SPCK. 1963.
- Building Accounts of King Henry III. Oxford: Oxford University Press. 1971. ISBN 0-19-920013-0. (editor)
- Unbuilt Oxford. Yale University Press. 1983. ISBN 0-300-03126-2.
- The Canterbury Quadrangle, St. John's College, Oxford. Oxford: Oxford University Press. 1988. ISBN 0-19-920159-5.
- Architecture and the After-Life. New Haven: Yale University Press. 1991. ISBN 0-300-05098-4.
- A Biographical Dictionary of British Architects, 1600–1840 (4th ed.). New Haven: Yale University Press. 2008 [1954]. ISBN 978-0-300-12508-5. OCLC 1147989725 – via Internet Archive.
- Entries for Charles Long, 1st Baron Farnborough and Isaac de Caus in the Oxford Dictionary of National Biography
- Calke Abbey Derbyshire, a Hidden House Revealed. 1985 National Trust. ISBN 9780540010844
- The White Canons in England. Oxford: Oxford University Press. 1951. ISBN 978-0198212096.
